= Rana (name) =

Given name and surname

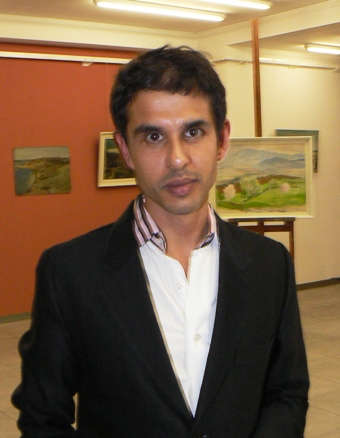
British-Indian author Rana Dasgupta

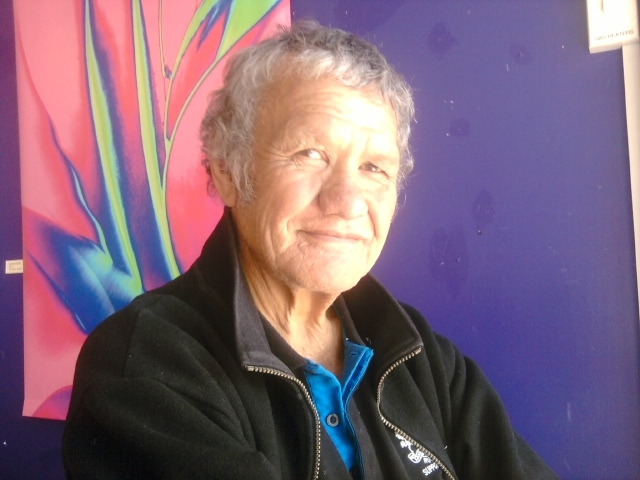
New Zealand politician Rana Waitai

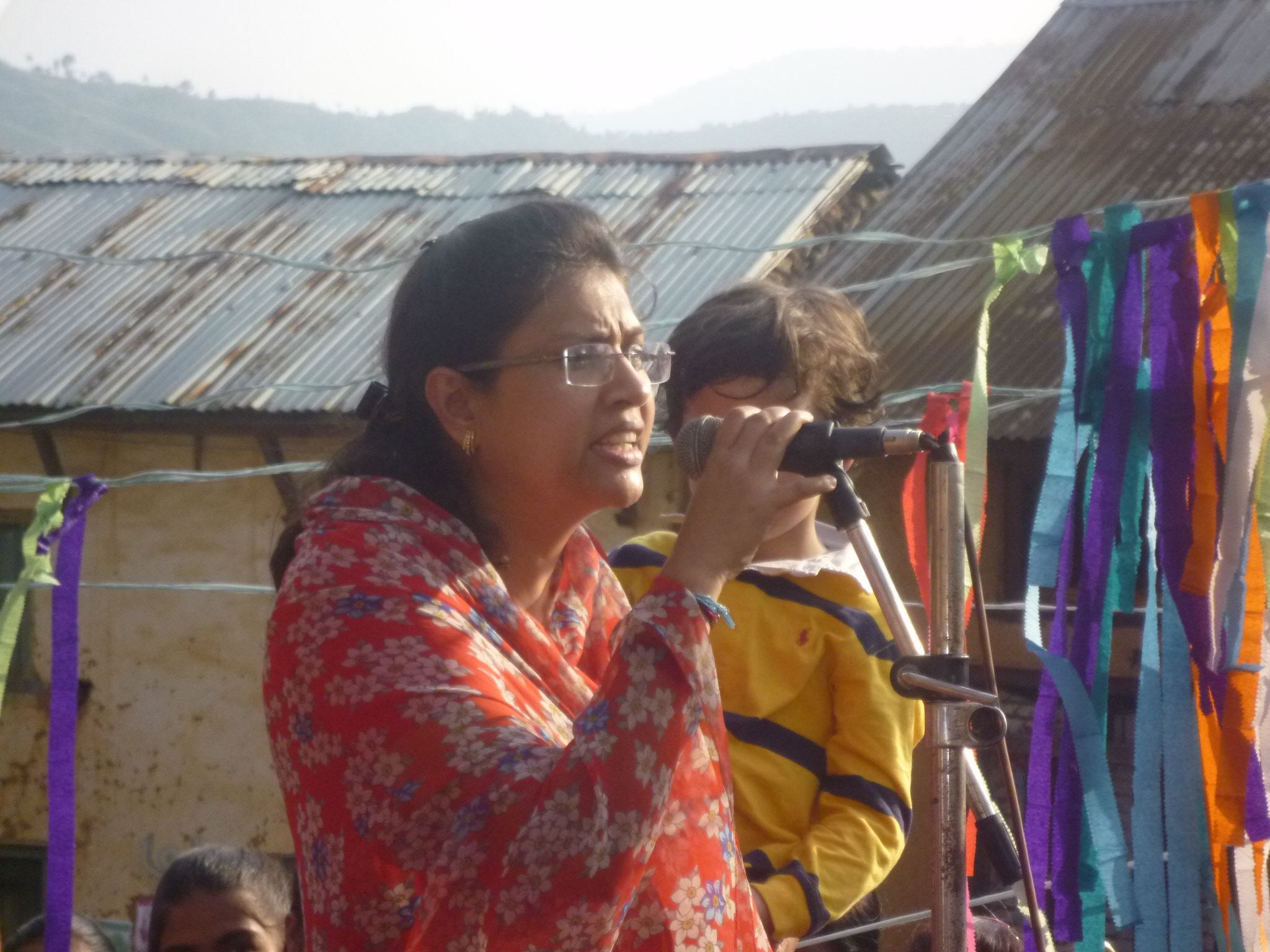
Nepalese princess Devyani Rana

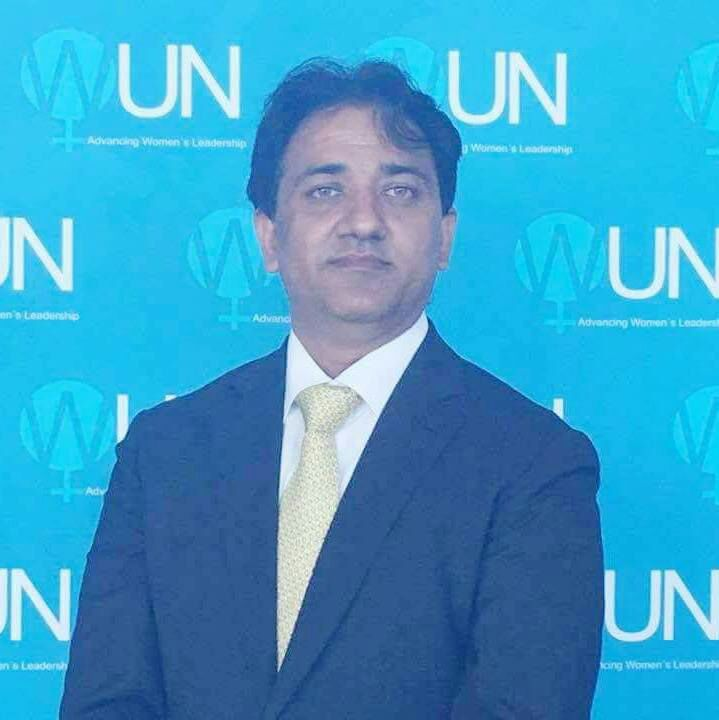
Shammi Rana, Indian sports executive and administrator

Rana is a given name and surname with multiple origins.

In Arabic, Rana is a female given name. In the Indian subcontinent, it is a male given name and surname, both of which derive from the medieval Indian title rana meaning "king" (a masculine counterpart of rani).

The Spanish and Italian surnames derive from rana meaning "frog". It is also a Galician toponymic surname from a place of the same name in the Province of A Coruña, Spain.

== Given name ==
- Rana Abdelhamid (born 1993), Egyptian-American entrepreneur and self-defense activist
- Rana X. Adhikari (born 1974), Indian-American experimental physicist
- Rana Afzaal Hussain (1947–2024), Pakistani politician
- Rana Afzal Khan (1949–2019), Pakistani politician, finance minister and army officer
- Rana Ahmad Hamd (born 1985), Saudi-born women's rights activist
- Rana Azadivar (born 1983), Iranian actress
- Rana Bhagwandas (1942–2015), Pakistani jurist and former acting chief justice of the Supreme Court of Pakistan
- Rana Bokhari (born 1977), Canadian politician
- Rana Daggubati (born 1984), Indian actor, producer, TV personality, visual effects co-ordinator and photographer
- Rana Dajani, Jordanian molecular biologist
- Rana Dasgupta (born 1971), British-Indian novelist and essayist
- Rana Farhan, Iranian-American musician and singer of jazz and blues
- Rana Foroohar (born 1970), American journalist, economic analyst and author
- Rana Hanımsultan (1926–2008), Ottoman princess
- Rana Hussein (born 1969), daughter of Saddam Hussein
- Rana Javadi (born 1953), Iranian photographer
- Rana Mashood Ahmad Khan (born 1966), Pakistani politician, lawyer and former deputy speaker of the Punjab Assembly (Pakistan)
- Rana Mohammad Hanif Khan (c. 1922–2005), Pakistani politician and former finance minister
- Rana Muhammad Iqbal Khan (born 1945), Pakistani politician and former speaker of the Punjab Assembly (Pakistan)
- Rana Mitter (born 1969), British-Indian historian, political scientist and Oxford University professor
- Rana Nakano (born 1997), Japanese individual trampoline gymnast
- Rana Nazeer Ahmed Khan (born 1949), Pakistani politician and lawyer
- Rana Okada (born 1991), Japanese snowboarder
- Rana Okuma (born 1998), Japanese professional footballer
- Rana Pratap Singh or Maharana Pratap (1540–1597), 16th-century Rajput king of Mewar in India
- Rana Samara (born 1985), Palestinian painter
- Rana Sanaullah (born 1950), Pakistani politician
- Rana K. P. Singh (born 1957), Indian politician and speaker of the Punjab Legislative Assembly (India)
- Rana Tanveer Hussain (born 1949), Pakistani politician and minister
- Rana Donald Waitai (1942–2021), New Zealand politician and lawyer

== Surname ==
- Abhiman Singh Rana Magar (died 1846), Nepalese army general and minister
- Amarjit Singh Rana, Indian field hockey player, Olympic medalist
- Ambureen Rana, American politician
- Ashutosh Rana (born 1964), Indian actor, producer, author and TV personality
- Aslam Rana, Canadian politician
- Azmat Rana (1951–2015), Pakistani cricketer
- Baber Shumsher Jung Bahadur Rana (1888–1960), Nepalese defence minister and member of the Rana dynasty
- Bakhtiar Rana (1910–1999), Pakistani army lieutenant general
- Balkrishna Sama (1903–1981), Nepalese playwright
- Balwinder Rana (born 1947), British activist
- Beatrice Rana (born 1993), Italian pianist
- Bhim Shumsher Jang Bahadur Rana (1865–1932), 14th Nepalese prime minister
- Bhim Singh Rana (c. 1707–1756), ruler of Gohad in India
- Bir Shumsher Jung Bahadur Rana (1852–1901), 11th Nepalese prime minister
- Chandra Shumsher Jung Bahadur Rana (1863–1929), 13th Nepalese prime minister
- Deepraj Rana, Indian actor
- Dev Shumsher Jung Bahadur Rana (1862–1914), 12th Nepalese prime minister
- Devyani Rana (born 1973), Nepalese princess
- Diamond Shumsher Rana (1918–2011), Nepalese storywriter and political activist
- Diljit Singh Rana, Baron Rana (born 1938), British politician and life peer of the House of Lords
- Gaurav Shumsher Jang Bahadur Rana (born 1955), Nepalese former chief of army staff and member of the Rana dynasty
- Gyanu Rana (born 1949), Nepalese singer and reality show judge
- Jaspal Rana (1976–2026), Indian sport pistol shooter
- Jayant Rana (died 1744) (Kaji of Gorkha and Kantipur) who commanded one battle for Gorkha and two battles for Kantipur against the invasion of Nuwakot
- Juddha Shumsher Jung Bahadur Rana (1875–1952), 15th Nepalese prime minister
- Jung Bahadur Rana (1816–1877), 8th Nepalese prime minister and founder of the Rana dynasty
- Kaiser Shumsher Jung Bahadur Rana (1892–1964), Nepalese army field marshal
- Karanbahadur Rana Magar (1898–1973), Nepalese Gurkha recipient of the Victoria Cross
- Kashiram Rana (1938–2012), Indian politician
- Kiran Shumsher Rana (1916–1983), Nepalese army officer
- Koyal Rana (born 1993), Indian model
- Kuber Singh Rana (born 1960), former inspector general of Nepal Police
- Luigi Rana (born 1986), Italian footballer
- Manjural Islam Rana (1984–2007), Bangladeshi cricketer
- Masood Rana (1938–1995), Pakistani playback singer
- Moammar Rana (born 1974), Pakistani actor and film director
- Mohan Shumsher Jung Bahadur Rana (1885–1967), 17th Nepalese prime minister and foreign minister
- Munawwar Rana (1952–2024), Indian poet
- Nara Shumsher Jang Bahadur Rana (1911–2006), former chief of Nepal Police
- Natasha Rana, American founder and CEO of Symple Health
- Navneet Kaur Rana (born 1985), Indian actress and politician
- Om Bikram Rana, former inspector general of Nepal Police
- Padma Shumsher Jung Bahadur Rana (1882–1961), 16th Nepalese prime minister
- Pashupati Shumsher Jung Bahadur Rana (born 1941), Nepalese politician, former minister and member of the Rana dynasty
- Pradip Shumsher Jang Bahadur Rana, former inspector general of Nepal Police
- Ratna Shumsher Jang Bahadur Rana, former inspector general of Nepal Police
- Sarbajit Rana Magar (1750–1778), Nepalese Army Chief and prominent politician, 18th century.
- Sardarsinhji Ravaji Rana (1870–1957), Indian political activist
- Santosh Rana (1942–2019), Indian politician
- Santosh Rana (CPI) (born 1948), Indian communist politician
- Shafqat Rana (born 1943), former Pakistani cricketer
- Shakoor Rana (1936–2001), Pakistani cricketer and umpire
- Sanjay Rana (born 2001), Indian field hockey player, Olympic medalist
- Sohail Rana (born 1938), Pakistani music composer for films and television
- Sohel Rana (actor) (born 1947), Bangladeshi actor, director and producer
- Sohel Rana (businessman) (born 1977), Bangladeshi businessman
- Sohel Rana (footballer, born 1995) (born 1995), Bangladeshi footballer
- Subarna Shamsher Rana (1910–1977), 21st Nepalese prime minister
- Tahawwur Hussain Rana (born 1961), Pakistani Army physician, businessman and Islamist militant
- Toran Shumsher Jung Bahadur Rana (1904-??), Nepalese army commander-in-chief and former inspector general of Nepal Police
- Udaya Shumsher Rana (born 1970), Nepalese politician, former minister and member of the Rana dynasty
- Shammi Rana (born 1978), Indian sports executive and administrator

== Fictional characters ==
- Masud Rana, a character from the 472-book novel series by Qazi Anwar Hussain and its adaptations
- Mida Rana, a rival from Yandere Simulator
- Rāna Kaname (要 楽奈), a fictional character and the lead guitarist of the alternative rock band MyGO!!!!! in the musical media franchise BanG Dream! and the BanG Dream! spin-off anime series BanG Dream! It's MyGO!!!!!

== Others ==
- Jadi Rana, an Indian ruler in the 1599 Zoroastrian epic poem Qissa-i Sanjan
- Rana Jashraj, a Hindu deity
- Rana Niejta, a goddess in Sámi mythology
