= Manoj KC =

34th Inspector General of Nepal Police

I.G.P. Manoj KC

34th Inspector General of Nepal Police
- Incumbent
- Assumed office 4 November 2026
- President: Ram Chandra Paudel
- Prime Minister: Balendra Shah
- Preceded by: Dan Bahadur Karki

AIG of Crime Investigation Department
- In office 2 July 2026 – 4 November 2026
- President: Ram Chandra Paudel
- Prime Minister: Balendra Shah

Chief of Central Investigation Bureau
- In office 21 September 2025 – 2 July 2026
- President: Ram Chandra Paudel
- Prime Minister: Sushila Karki; Balendra Shah

Personal details
- Education: Paññāsāstra University of Cambodia (PhD, M.A.); Tribhuvan University (2 M.A.); Siddhartha Vanasthali Institute (basic schooling)
- Occupation: Police officer
- Books: Enhancing Policing in Nepal; Identifying Effective Measures to Combat Organized Crime in Post-Conflict Nepal

Dr. Manoj Kumar KC is a Nepali police officer. He is serving as the 34th Inspector General of Nepal Police, the highest police rank of Nepal Police since 4 November 2026. He succeeded Dan Bahadur Karki after Karki was appointed as the prime minister's special security advisor.

He served as the head of the Central Investigation Bureau of Nepal Police. He was appointed in September 2025 by the interim cabinet of prime minister Sushila Karki.

He came into public attention for his work in the investigation of the fake Bhutanese refugee scam.

== Education ==
KC completed his basic schooling from Siddharth Vanasthali Institute in Kathmandu. He holds a PhD in Conflict Transformation and a master's degree in Applied Conflict Transformation Studies from Panñāsāstra University in Cambodia. He also holds two master's degrees in Sociology and Public Administration from Tribhuvan University in Nepal.

KC is also proficient in French and Spanish, in addition to Nepali and English.

== Career ==
KC joined the Nepal Police as an Inspector on 10 April 1998. After over a decade of service, he was promoted to Deputy Superintendent of Police (DSP) on 11 December 2009, serving until 3 August 2017. He was promoted to Superintendent of Police (SP) on 3 August 2017, serving until 18 July 2022.

On 19 July 2022, KC was promoted to Senior Superintendent of Police (SSP) where he served until 19 July 2022. From 19 July 2022 to 21 August 2023, he served as chief of the Kathmandu Valley Crime Investigation Office. During this period, he gained national attention for leading the investigation into the fake Bhutanese refugees scam.

He was promoted to Deputy Inspector General of Police (DIG) on 26 May 2024, serving until 23 April 2025. On 24 April 2025, he was promoted to Additional Inspector General of Police (AIG), the second-highest rank in the Nepal Police.

As an AIG, KC was initially assigned to the Provincial Coordination Department. On 21 September 2025, he was appointed head of the Central Investigation Bureau (CIB). He served in this role until 2 July 2026, when he was transferred to head the Crime Investigation Department (CID). He served as CID head until his appointment as IGP on 4 November 2026.

On 4 November 2026, the Balen Shah cabinet appointed KC as the 34th Inspector General of Police (IGP) under Rule 41 of the Police Regulations, 2014 following the early removal of Dan Bahadur Karki from the post. Karki, who had 17 months remaining in his term, was reassigned as Special Security Advisor to the Prime Minister Balendra Shah, a newly created position with a rank equivalent to IGP. On 5 November 2026, Karki filed a writ petition in the Supreme Court of Nepal, challenging his removal as unlawful and sought reinstatement as IGP.

The removal drew comparisons to a similar incident in 1997, when then Home Minister Bam Dev Gautam removed the 16th IGP, Achyut Krishna Kharel, and transferred him to the National Investigation Department. The transfer was controversial because no position had been established for Kharel there. He was replaced by Dhruba Bahadur Pradhan. Kharel challenged the government's decision in the Supreme Court, which ruled that the action was improper and led to his reinstatement as IGP.

KC has also served as a security officer in United Nations missions in Kosovo and Haiti. He was the founding director of Nepal Police Staff College, the first institution of its kind within Nepal Police.

== Bibliography ==
KC has also authored two books, including Enhancing Policing Nepal and Identifying Effective Measures to Combat Organized Crime in Post-Conflict Nepal, reflecting his interest in professional policing and efforts to address organized crime.
