= Shumsher =

Shumsher is a given name popular in Nepal, and was carried by most of the Rana dynasty. Notable people with the surname include:

== Politics ==
- Bahadur Shumsher Jung Bahadur Rana (1892–1977), diplomat
- Bharat Shumsher Jung Bahadur Rana (c. 1929–2018), politician
- Bhim Shumsher Jung Bahadur Rana (1865–1932), 14th Prime Minister of Nepal
- Bir Shumsher Jung Bahadur Rana (1852–1901), 11th Prime Minister of Nepal
- Chandra Shumsher Jung Bahadur Rana (1863–1929), 13th Prime Minister of Nepal
- Cholendra Shumsher JB Rana (born 1957), judge
- Dev Shumsher Jung Bahadur Rana (1862–1914), 12th Prime Minister of Nepal
- Jagdish Shumsher Rana (1929–2017), writer and politician
- Juddha Shumsher Jung Bahadur Rana (1875–1952), 15th Prime Minister of Nepal
- Khadga Shumsher Jung Bahadur Rana (1861–1921), politician and military commander-in-chief
- Krishna Shumsher Jung Bahadur Rana (1900–1977), diplomat
- Mohan Shumsher Jung Bahadur Rana (1885–1967), foreign minister
- Padma Shumsher Jung Bahadur Rana (1882–1961), 16th Prime Mimister of Nepal
- Pashupati Shumsher Jung Bahadur Rana (born 1941), politician
- Udaya Shumsher Rana (born 1970), youth leader and politician

== Military ==
- Baber Shumsher Jung Bahadur Rana (1888–1960), commander-in-chief of Nepal military Dambar Shumsher Rana Dambar Shumsher Rana (1859–1922), photographer and army general
- Dhir Shumsher Rana (1828–1884), army general and politician
- Gaurav Shumsher JB Rana (born 1955), Chief of Army
- Gehendra Shumsher (1871–1906), firearm manufacturer and army general
- Jagat Shumsher Rana (1826–1879), commander-in-chief
- Kaiser Shumsher Jung Bahadur Rana (1892–1964), field marshal
- Kiran Shumsher Rana (1916–1986), commander-in-chief
- Nir Shumsher Jung Bahadur Rana (1913–2013), field marshal
- Rana Shumsher Jung Bahadur Rana (1861–1887), commander-in-chief of Nepal military
- Rudra Shumsher Jung Bahadur Rana, field marshal

== Police ==
- Nara Shumsher Jang Bahadur Rana (1911–2006), police chief
- Ratna Shumsher J.B.R., inspector general
- Pradip Shumsher J.B.R., police chief
- Toran Shumsher Jung Bahadur Rana (1904–?), police chief

== Other ==
- Diamond Shumsher Rana (1918–2011), writer and activist
- Madan Shumsher JBR, cricketer
- Ratna Shumsher Thapa (1939–2020), lyricist
