= Hem Bahadur Gurung =

20th Inspector General of Nepal Police

I.G.P. Hem Bahadur Gurung
- हेम बहादुर गुरुङ
- Police career
- Country: Nepal
- Department: Nepal Police
- Service years: 1979-2009
- Rank: Inspector General of Police (I.G.P.)

Hem Bahadur Gurung (Nepali: हेमबहादुर गुरुङ) was the 20th IGP of Nepal. On September 14, 2008, he was appointed Inspector General of Nepal Police, the highest police rank of Nepal Police. He was preceded by Om Bikram Rana and was succeeded by Ramesh Chand Thakuri as the police chief. His term had begun on September 18, 2008, and had ended in February 2009.

He was sentenced to one year in prison for corruption by the Supreme Courtin 2017 for his role in the Armoured Police Carrier scam.
