= Nepal Police School =

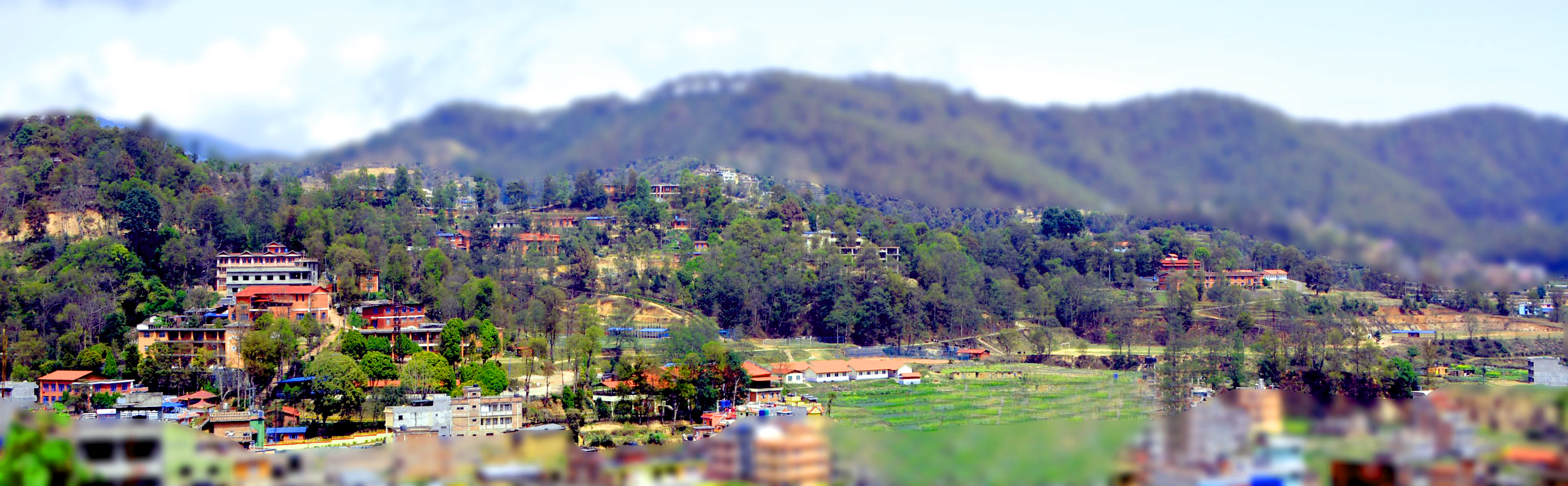

Location
- Banepa Municipality 13, Sanga. Banepa, Sanga (Central School), Bagmati; Nepal

Information
- Type: Public
- Motto: Better Schooling for Ideal Citizens
- Established: 2040 B.S (1983 CE)
- Founder: DB Lama
- School district: Kavrepalanchok
- Authority: Nepal Police
- Principal: Mohan Poudel
- Faculty: 2 (Science and Management)
- Enrollment: 2016
- Colors: Sky and navy Blue, occasionally red
- Sports: Football, Judo, Karate, Cricket, Basketball, Badminton, Volleyball, Tennis, Gymnastics, Table tennis
- Nickname: D'cops, N'cops
- Publication: Deepika (Nepali: दीपिका)
- Affiliations: School Leaving Certificate (Nepal), National Examination Board (Nepal)
- Website: nps.edu.np

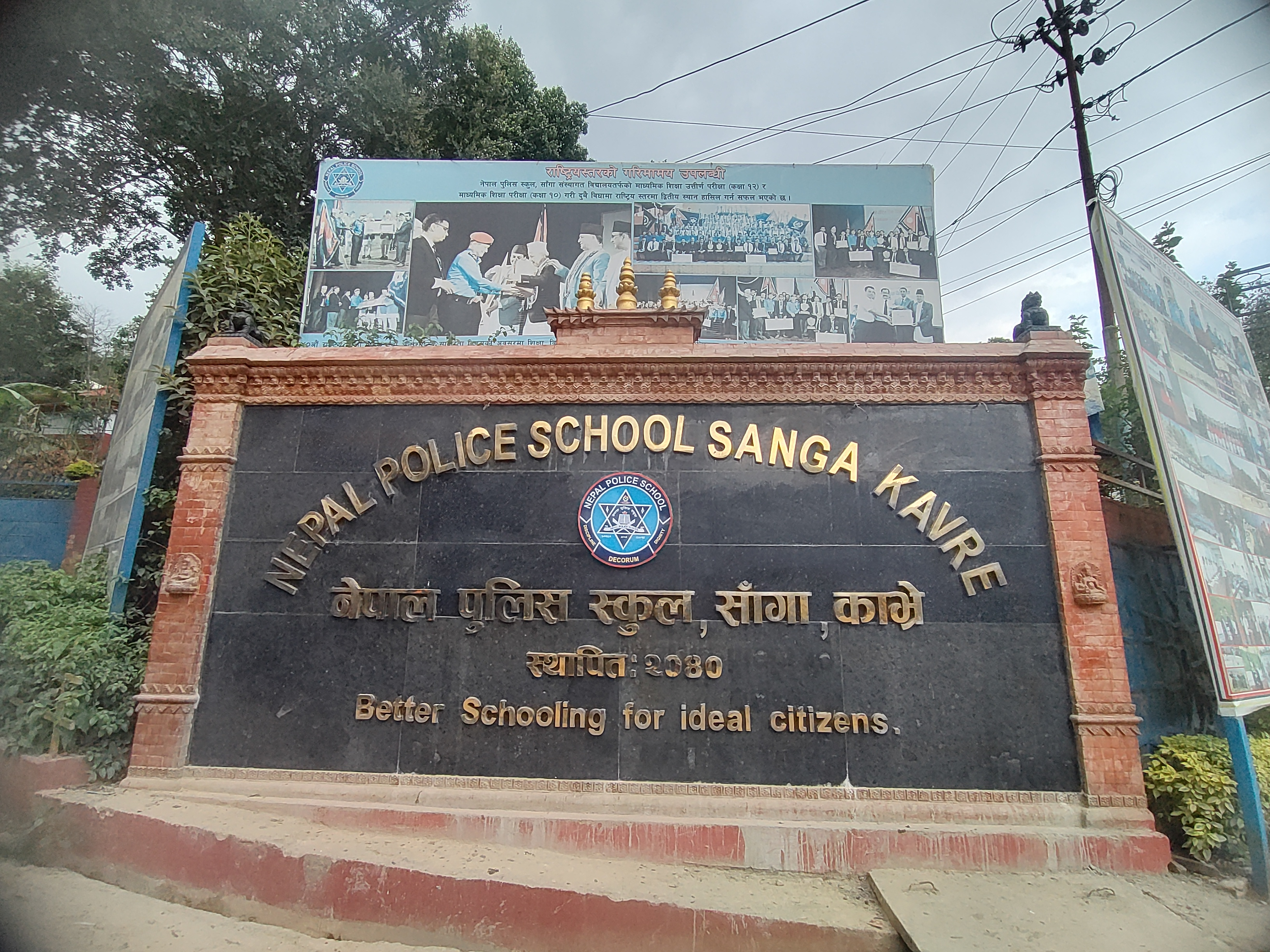
Nepal Police School

The Nepal Police School (Nepali: नेपाल प्रहरी विद्यालय) usually shortened as “NPS” is a police managed school. It is a regional system of police boarding schools in Nepal. However the schools predominantly teaches children of Nepal Police personnel, children of civilians also get admission. The school has alocated 40% of the quota to the civilians.

Previously the school was known as Dipendra Police School (Nepali: दिपेन्द्र पुलिस विद्यालय) (DPS) named after the late King Dipendra Bir Bikram Shah of the Kingdom of Nepal. Prospective students sit entrance exams as part of the admissions process. These schools are funded by the welfare program of the Nepal Police Organisation. The school's history, reputation for discipline, and holistic approach to education with a special focus on physical education and athletics have contributed to NPS being considered one of Nepal's most reputable schools.

The school was founded in 2040 B.S. (1983 CE) by former IGP (Inspector General of Police), late DB Lama and is located at Banepa-13, Sanga, 15 miles east of Kathmandu. The school grounds cover more 200 acres on the growing forest and orchard of the southern sloped hills in region.

The school admits pupils from class years 4 to 12 and follows the SLC (School Leaving Certificate) board and NEB (National Examination Board) curriculum. It offers boarding schools with strict policies and a rigorous academic atmosphere. A central school governing body exists in Sanga, but the regional schools generally maintain a high of autonomy in running their respective schools.

== Other branches ==
- Nepal Police Boarding High School, Dharan, Sunsari District (Eastern Regional School), officially and more popularly known as Purwa Chhetriya Police Boarding High School. Also called Eastern Regional Police Boarding High School.
- Nepal Police Boarding High School, Belchautara, Tanahu District (Western Regional School)
- Nepal Police School, Ghorahi, Dang Deokhuri District (Mid-Western Regional School)
- Nepal Police Boarding High School, Dhangadi, Kailali District (Far Western Regional School)
- Nepal Police School (Secondary), Samakhusi, Kathmandu District
- Mid Regional Police Boarding High School, Jigadhiya, Rautahat District (Mid Regional School)
- Nepal Police School, Chitwan
- Nepal Police School, Surkhet

== School administration ==
The school's academic and administrative functions are headed by the Principal and Camp Commandant (Nepal Police officer) respectively. The Camp Commandant of the Central School, Sanga is ranked Dy.SP (Deputy Superintendent of Police) and the commandant of branch schools are ranked Inspector.

== Academics ==
The school curriculum is presented primarily in English. But an emphasis exists on developing skills in both written and oral Nepali. The school follows guidelines set by the Ministry of Education and the Higher Secondary Education Board of Nepal.

The central school received the Birendra Vidhya Rastriya Shield in the years 2051/52 B.S. and 2055/56 B.S.

Many alumni of the school have shown impressive academic performance in various educational sectors. Pranesh Pyara Shrestha, who graduated from Nepal Police School, Dharan in 2074 B.S.(2018 CE) was declared "Sunsari Topper" in the final examination of Grade-11 and continued this feat by again maintaining his position as the District Topper in Grade-12 conducted by National Examination Board(N.E.B.), making him the "Back-to-back" Sunsari Topper. Similarly, Abhijaya Shrestha was declared Sunsari Topper in the S.L.C. examination of 2068(B.S.). [Note: Topper is a term commonly used in Nepal to refer to someone ranked first in a particular field]

== Sports ==
The central school has received the Birendra Shield Regional Award in the year 2048 B.S and Regional Award in the year 2061 B.S. Police Schools are best known for their good sports teams, notably in football. The central school at Sanga has won numerous tournaments and yearly hosts the renowned IGP (Inspector General Police) Running trophy, an inter-school football tournament. The school football team has long-standing rivalries with Birendra Sainik School, a military boarding school. The Eastern regional school at Dharan used to organize a similar DIG Cup football tournament for schools in the Eastern Development Region of Nepal but this was discontinued after the 2006 season.

The schools have produced several professional football players, who have competed at the highest level for the club, and nationally.

- The decorated former goalkeeper Upendra Man Singh who also captained the national team for a decade attended the Dipendra Police School, Sanga (Central School).
- The current Nepal footballer Bimal Gharti Magar attended the Dipendra Police School, Belchautara, Tanahu District (Western Regional School).

== Uniform ==
=== School level (4–10) ===
The school dress for students at Police schools in Nepal is inspired by the country's police uniform. Students wear sky-blue shirts, navy blue pants, school-issued ties and belts, blue socks, and black shoes. Girls often replace navy blue pants with navy blue skirts. Students may also add a navy blue sweater or blazer during winter months. Nails need to be trimmed, hair neatly combed and cut short for boys, and shirts should be tucked in.

=== Collage Level (11–12) ===
Unlike for School level in +2 has two different uniforms for science and management steam students (Both Boys and Girls). For the students of Science Steam, The students wear white shirt, gray pants, school-issued ties and belts, blue socks, and black shoes. For the students of Management Steam, The students wear white shirt with blue strips, gray pants, school-issued ties and belts, blue socks, and black shoes. Girls need to tie their hair with white hair bands. Students may also add a navy blue sweater or blazer during winter months just like school level.
