= Durlav Kumar Thapa =

10th Inspector General of Nepal Police (1929–2025)

IGP Durlav Kumar Thapa
- दुर्लभ कुमार थापा
- Born: 15 November 1929
- Died: 22 April 2025 (aged 95); Lalitpur, Nepal
- Predecessor: Khadgajeet Baral (as IGP)
- Successor: Dil Bahadur Lama (as IGP)
- Police career
- Country: Nepal
- Department: Nepal Police
- Rank: Inspector General of Police (IGP)

Durlav Kumar Thapa (Nepali: दुर्लभ कुमार थापा; 15 November 1929 – 22 April 2025) was a police chief of Nepal Police. He was a highly decorated police officer who made contributions to the then National Police Training Academy.

In 2013 he was awarded the Nepal Police’s Lifetime Achievement award at the Sadar Prahari Talim Kendra. During his tenure as I.G.P., he had introduced "Tourist police" and the IGP Residence.

Thapa died on 22 April 2025, at the age of 95.
