= Sarbendra Khanal =

26th Chief of Nepal Police

I.G.P. Sarbendra Khanal

26th Inspector General of Nepal Police
- In office 12 April 2018 – 11 February 2020
- President: Bidhya Devi Bhandari
- Prime Minister: Khadga Prasad Oli
- Preceded by: Prakash Aryal
- Succeeded by: Thakur Prasad Gyawaly

Personal details
- Born: 25 April 1966 (age 60) Tanahun, Nepal
- Citizenship: Nepalese
- Spouse: Pramila Khanal
- Education: Tribhuvan University; Amrit Campus
- Occupation: Police Officer

Sarbendra Khanal (Nepali: सर्वेन्द्र खनाल) was the 26th Chief of Nepal Police. He was appointed the Chief of Nepal Police after succeeding Prakash Aryal on 10 April 2018 by the cabinet decision of the Government of Nepal. He was former spokesperson of Nepal Police.

== Early life and career ==
Born on April 25, 1966, in Tanahu, IGP Mr. Khanal graduated with bachelor's degree in Management and master's degree in Public Administration from Tribhuvan University.

== Policing career ==
As SSP of Nepal Police, Sarbendra Khanal led the encounter of gangster Kumar Ghainte and solved a match-fixing case involving Nepal’s national football team, finding four players guilty. He was later honored by the AFC for his role in the investigation. Khanal also solved the death of taxi driver Raj Kumar Lama and was praised for crime control in Kathmandu. He was promoted to DIG, ranking highest based on work evaluation. Acknowledging the investigation of match-fixing case as a milestone, he was honored by the Asian Football Confederation (AFC) amidst a special function organized in Malaysia in 2017.

== Inspector General of Police ==
Sarbendra Khanal was appointed the 26th Inspector General of Nepal Police on April 10, 2018, and assumed office two days later. He also served as the Ex-Officio Head of the National Central Bureau, INTERPOL, in Kathmandu.

Khanal completed various police courses in Nepal and internationally, including VIP security and law enforcement programs in the U.S. and Italy. He was involved in two UN peacekeeping missions in Yugoslavia and Haiti and participated in an investigation into the trafficking of Nepali women in 2016.

Khanal has received several national and international awards for his service, including the Gorkha Dakchhin Bahu and UN Medal. He emphasized rule of law, human rights protection, and a zero-tolerance approach to corruption during his career.

== Political career ==
Khanal joined CPN (Unified Marxist–Leninist) ahead of the 2022 elections and was a candidate for the House of Representatives for Kathmandu 6 from the party.

== Personal life ==
Mr. Khanal has been married to his wife, Pramila Khanal, and they have two daughters, Shreyashi Khanal and Yashaswi Khanal.

== Electoral history ==
=== 2022 Tanahun-1 by election ===
Candidate	Party	Votes	%
Swarnim Wagle	Rastriya Swatantra Party	34,919	54.45
Gobinda Bhattarai	Nepali Congress	20,122	31.37
Sarbendra Khanal	CPN (UML)	8,488	13.23
Others	Others	606	0.94
Total		64,135	100.00
Majority		14,797	
Rastriya Swatantra Party gain			
Source: https://result.election.gov.np/ElectionResultCentral2079bi.aspx

=== 2022 general election ===
(Kathmandu 6)

Candidate	Party	Votes	%
Shishir Khanal	Rastriya Swatantra Party	14,221	38.01
Sarbendra Khanal	CPN (UML)	8,917	23.84
Bhimsen Das Pradhan	Nepali Congress	8,812	23.55
Bishnu Prasad Acharya	Rastriya Prajatantra Party	2,185	5.84
Others		3,276	8.76
Total		37,411	100.00
Majority		5,304	
Rastriya Swatantra Party gain			

== See also ==
- Nepal Police
- Inspector General of Police (Nepal)
