= Rabindra Pratap Shah =

22nd Inspector General of Nepal Police

- रवीन्द्र प्रताप शाह

Member of 2nd Nepalese Constituent Assembly
- In office 2014–2017
- President: Dr. Ram Baran Yadav
- Prime Minister: Sushil Koirala

22nd Inspector General of Nepal Police
- In office 2 June 2011 – 12 September 2012
- President: Dr. Ram Baran Yadav
- Prime Minister: Jhalanath Khanal
- Preceded by: Ramesh Chand Thakuri
- Succeeded by: Kuber Singh Rana

Personal details
- Born: 27 June 1957 (age 69) Maidi, Dhading District, Nepal
- Party: CPN-Maoist
- Education: Tribhuvan University
- Occupation: Politician, police officer

Rabindra Pratap Shah (born 27 June 1957) is a former Inspector General of Nepal Police. On 2 June 2011, he assumed the duties of the chief of Nepal Police, after succeeding Ramesh Chand Thakuri. Shah was born in Maidi in the Dhading District, and graduated from Tribhuvan University with a Bachelor's degree in Business Administration.

Shah joined the Nepalese police service on 1 September 1982, as an Inspector of Police. Later he served sequentially as In-Charge of six District Police Offices and three Zonal Police Offices. He was promoted to the rank of Deputy Inspector General of Police in 2006 and served as the Director of the Training Directorate as well as Chief of a Regional Police Office.

Shah was also a member of Constituent Assembly (CA) representing the UCPN (Maoist) party.
