= Shyam Bhakta Thapa =

18th Inspector General of Nepal Police

I.G.P. Shyam Bhakta Thapa
- Police career
- Country: Nepal
- Department: Nepal Police
- Service years: 1976–2006
- Rank: Inspector General of Police (I.G.P.)

Shyam Bhakta Thapa (Nepali: श्यामभक्त थापा) is the 18th IGP of Nepal and the last police officer of Nepal Police to serve as the police chief during the Maoists Insurgency. He was preceded by Pradip Shumsher J.B.R. as the police chief and was succeeded by Om Bikram Rana. He had been the police chief during the Peoples Movement II.
