= Everest rescue fraud =

Insurance fraud scheme

Everest rescue fraud refers to a series of coordinated insurance fraud schemes in Nepal involving trekking agencies, helicopter operations, and medical facilities. Following an investigation in 2025–2026 by the Central investigation Bureau (CIB), authorities uncovered a network that allegedly falsely stated or exaggerated medical emergencies to claim millions in Everest insurance payouts.

== Investigations and tactics ==
Authorities allege that guides and operators used various methods to justify emergency helicopter evacuations. In some instances, trekking staff reportedly added substances such as baking soda to hiker's food to induce gastrointestinal distress, or administered excessive doses of Diamox to mimic the symptoms of severe altitude sickness. Once a climber was deemed "unwell," they were pressured into an evacuation.

The investigation revealed that hospitals in Kathmandu often colluded by providing forged medical records, inflating ICU admission stays, and billing multiple insurance providers for a single helicopter flight that carries several passengers simultaneously.

== Legal action and impact ==
In early 2026, the Kathmandu District Court began proceeding against 32 individuals, including owners of prominent trekking agencies and medical personnel, on charge of organized crime and offences against the state. The CIB estimated the total value of fraudulent claims at approximately $20 million between 2022 and 2025.

The scandal has significantly impacted Nepal's tourism reputation. Consequently, several international insurance underwriters have stricter verification protocols or increased premium for high-altitude coverage in the Everest region.

In early 2026, the Central Investigation Bureau said that 10 people were arrested as a result of the scam, including individuals from a trekking company, a rescue company and hospitals.
