= Shailesh Thapa Chhetri =

Nepali police officer

I.G.P. Shailesh Thapa Chhetri
- शैलेश थापा क्षेत्री
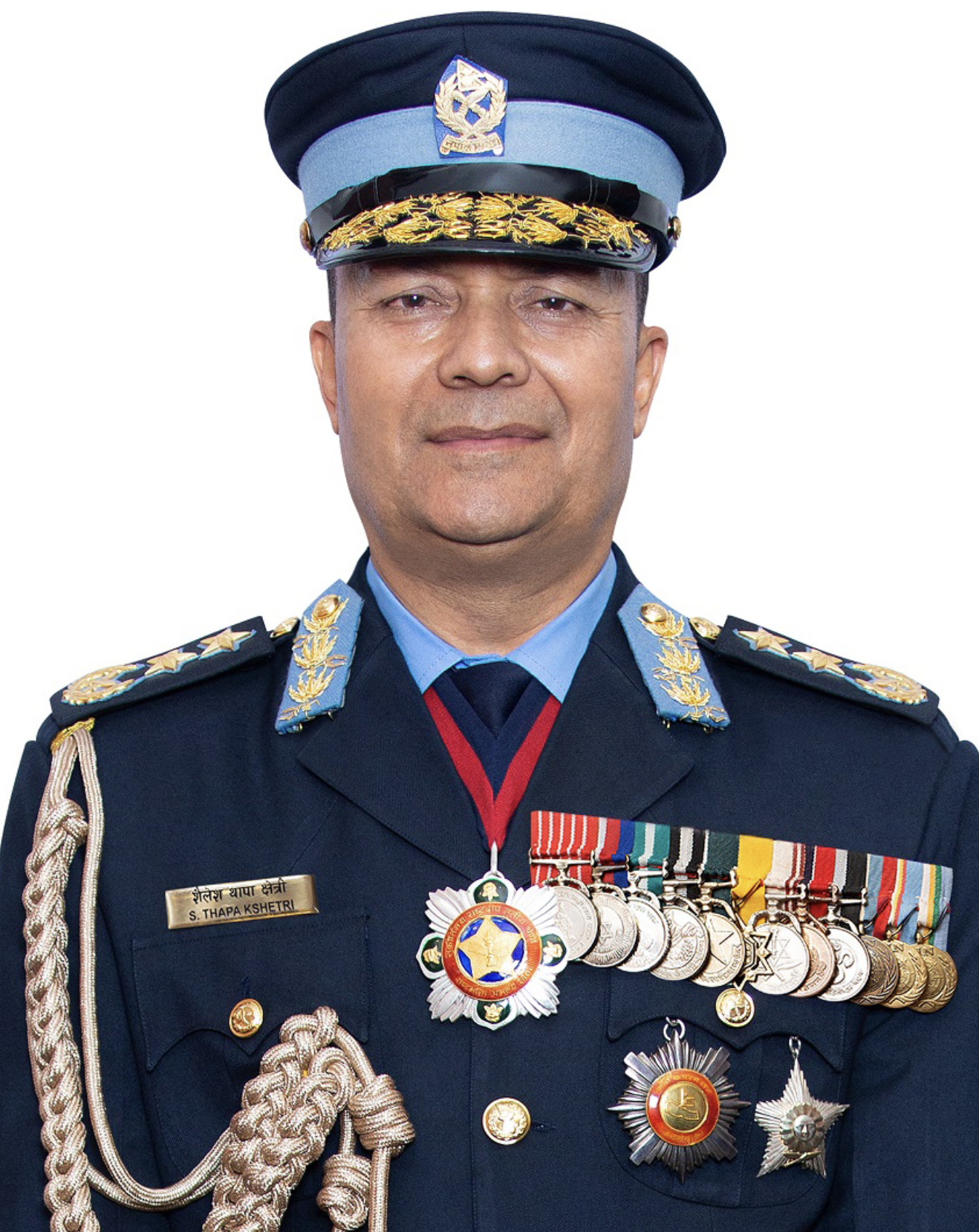

28th Inspector General of Nepal Police
- In office 9 July 2020 – 3 May 2022
- President: Bidhya Devi Bhandari
- Prime Minister: Khadga Prasad Oli; Sher Bahadur Deuba
- Vice President: Nanda Kishor Pun
- Preceded by: Thakur Prasad Gyawaly
- Succeeded by: Dhiraj Pratap Singh

Personal details
- Born: 8 December 1968 (age 57) Bhaktapur
- Citizenship: Nepalese
- Education: Master's degree in Political science
- Occupation: Police officer

Shailesh Thapa Chhetri (Nepali: शैलेश थापा क्षेत्री) (born 8 December 1968) is the 28th Inspector General of Nepal Police. He was appointed the Inspector General of Nepal Police after succeeding Thakur Prasad Gyawaly on 9 July 2020 following a cabinet decision. He joined Nepal Police as an Inspector on May 1, 1992.

On 26 December 2021, he attended the meeting of the Central Security Committee which was related to the upcoming National Assembly election and overall situation of law and order in the country. He attended an Interpol meeting at Turkey on 21 November 2021.

Mr. Chhetri was succeeded by Dhiraj Pratap Singh as the Inspector General of Nepal Police on 3 May 2022.
