= Hem Bahadur Singh =

12th Inspector General of Nepal Police

I.G.P. Hem Bahadur Singh
- हेम बहादुर सिंह
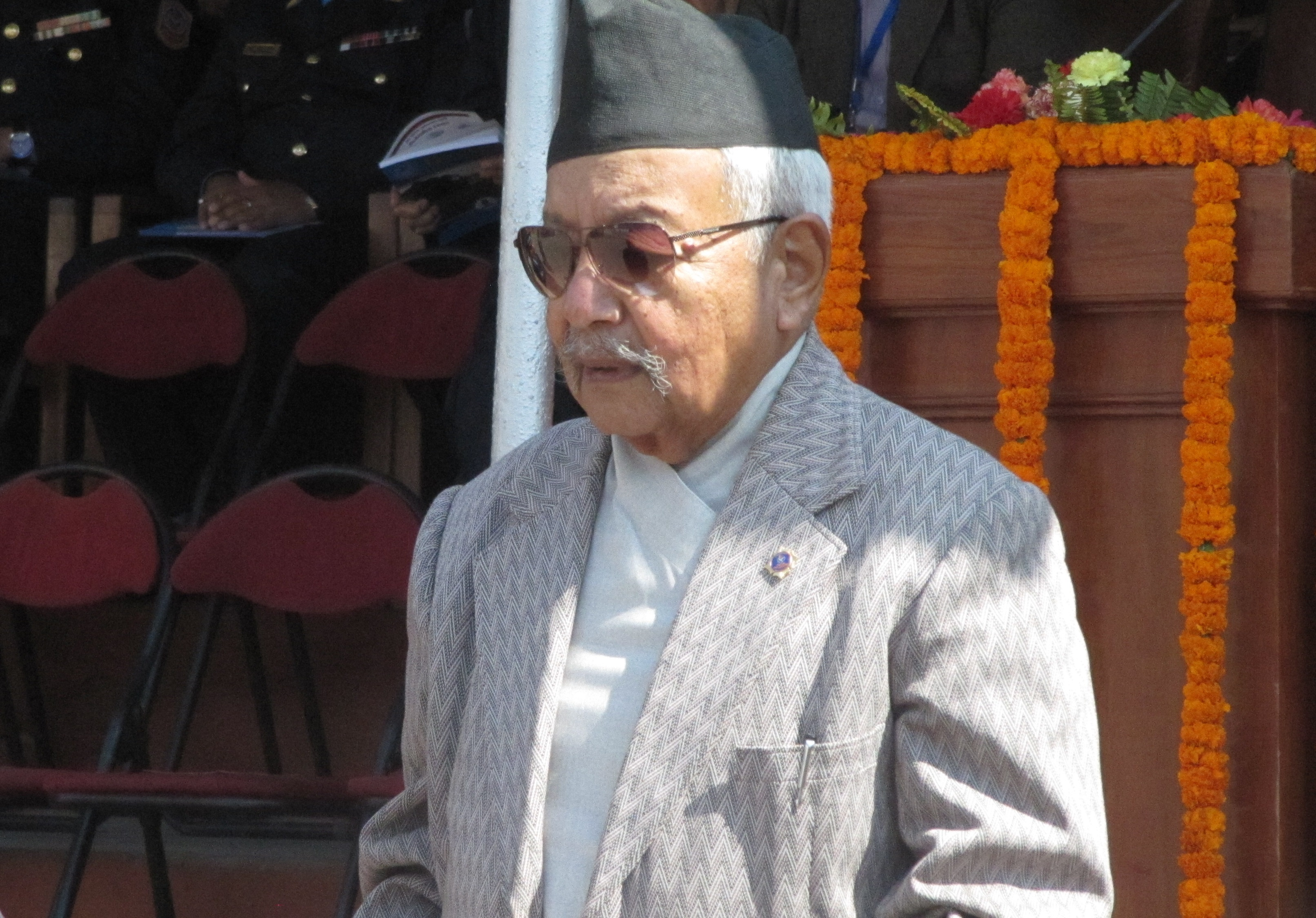
- Hem Bahadur Singh at the National Police Training Academy on the Academy's 22nd Annual Day, 2014.
- Died: October 25, 2019
- Police career
- Country: Nepal
- Department: Nepal Police
- Rank: Inspector General of Police (I.G.P.)

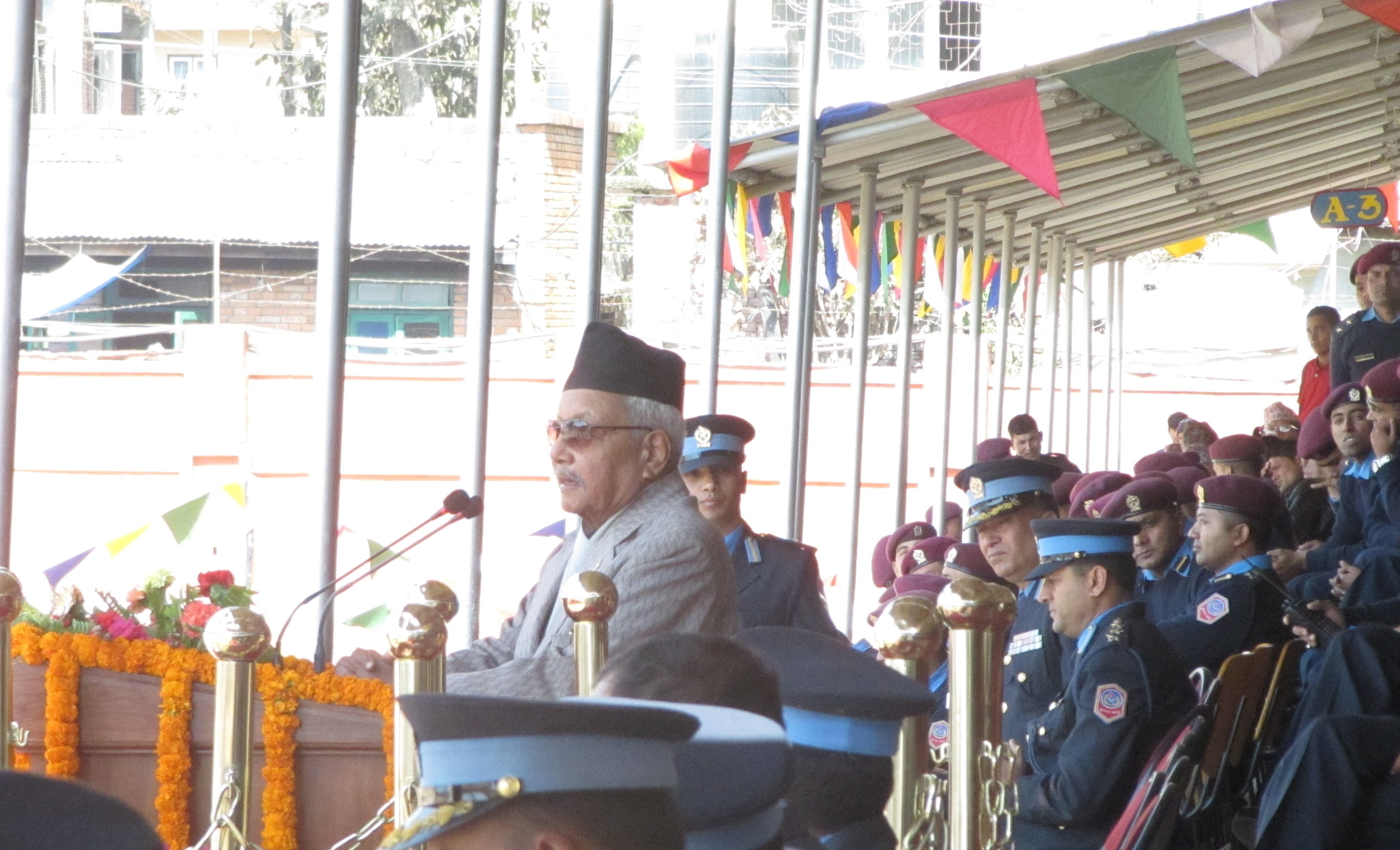
Hem Bahadur Singh giving a speech at the National Police Training Academy on the Academy's 22nd Annual Day, 2014.

Hem Bahadur Singh (Nepali:हेम बहादुर सिंह) was a retired chief of the Nepal Police. He was the last I.G.P. to wear the "Khaki" uniform. It was during his tenure as police chief that the 1990 People's Movement occurred.

Hem Bahadur Singh succeeded DB Lama as the Nepal police chief. Ratna Shumsher J.B.R. succeeded him as the next police chief.

Ex-I.G.P. Hem Bahadur Singh was awarded a lifetime achievement award by PM Bhattarai at a function organized by the National Police Academy, Maharajgunj, on the occasion of the 57th Police Day.
