= Chandra Kuber Khapung =

32nd Inspector General of Nepal Police

I.G.P. Chandra Kuber Khapung
- चन्द्र कुबेर खापुङ

32nd Inspector General of Nepal Police
- In office 4 September 2025 – 12 November 2025
- President: Ram Chandra Poudel
- Prime Minister: K. P. Sharma Oli; Sushila Karki
- Preceded by: Deepak Thapa
- Succeeded by: Dan Bahadur Karki

Personal details
- Born: 8 December 1970 (age 55) Tehrathum District, Nepal
- Spouse: Bhawana Shrestha

Chandra Kuber Khapung (Nepali: चन्द्र कुबेर खापुङ) is a former Nepali police officer. He served as the 32nd Inspector General of the Nepal Police. He served as the IGP from 4 September 2025 until 12 November 2025 and was succeeded by Dan Bahadur Karki.

He was the chief of Nepal police during the 2025 gen-z protest that occurred on September 8–9, 2025, his role was highly questioned by the people due to the mis-handling of the situation and the subsequent actions of the police force which led to severe scrutiny.

== Career ==
Khapung joined Nepal Police on 12 November 1995, became a Deputy Superintendent of Police (DSP) in September 2006, and later promoted to Superintendent of Police (SP) in January 2014. His rise continued with his promotion to Senior Superintendent of Police (SSP) in April 2020, and then to DIG on 13 April 2023. Khapung was appointed an Additional Inspector General (AIG) on 28 April 2025.
