= Dil Bahadur Lama =

11th Inspector General of Nepal Police

IGP Dil Bahadur Lama OGDB OTSP
- दिल बहादुर लामा

President of Ex-Nepalese Policemen's Organization
- In office 1992 – 25 March 2014
- Monarch: King Birendra
- Prime Minister: Girija Prasad Koirala

Assistant Minister
- In office 2001–Unknown
- Monarch: King Birendra
- Prime Minister: Sher Bahadur Deuba

11th Inspector General of Nepal Police
- In office June 1982 – June 1986
- Monarch: King Birendra
- Prime Minister: Surya Bahadur Thapa
- Preceded by: Durlav Kumar Thapa
- Succeeded by: Hem Bahadur Singh

Personal details
- Born: 21 March 1930
- Died: 25 March 2014 (aged 84)
- Citizenship: Nepalese
- Party: Nepali Congress (Democratic)
- Children: 5
- Occupation: Police officer, Politician
- Awards: Tri Shakti Patta
- {{{blank2}}}: Gorkha Dakshin Bahu
- {{{blank3}}}: Bishesh Sewa Padak (Special Service Medal)
- {{{blank4}}}: Prahari Ratna

Dil Bahadur Lama (Nepali: दिल बहादुर लामा) (21 March 1930 – 25 March 2014), popularly known as DB Lama was a leader of Nepali Congress (Democratic) and former Inspector General of Nepal Police. He was elected to the Pratinidhi Sabha in the 1999 election on behalf of the Nepali Congress. In 2001, he was included as an Assistant Minister of General Administration in Sher Bahadur Deuba's expanded cabinet. In that cabinet he served under Minister of General Administration Khemraj Bhatta 'Mayalu'. After the 2006 uprising against monarchy in Nepal, Lama was included in a Parliamentary Sub-Committee, organized to investigate the assets of the king.

== Career in law enforcement ==
Lama had, in his function as a police official, issued an arrest warrant in the 1980s for Mayalu, who was then considered as a terrorist by the Nepalese government.

Dil Bahadur Lama had joined the Nepal Police on Fagun 28, 2007 BS as the Warrant Officer 1 at the then Sadar Nepal Armed Constabulary and upgraded to the IGP post on Asar 1, 2039 BS.

The Nepal Police hospital, Nepal Police School and community police service were established during his tenure. Considered, by many of his former colleagues, one of the most influential chief of Nepal Police, Lama is credited with promoting recruitment of female officers, introducing separate uniform for traffic officers and publishing police bulletins, among others.

== Arrest in 1987 ==
Former IGP Dil Bahadur Lama was arrested in 1987 along with Colonel Bharat Gurung after being charged by His Majesty's Government in the involvement in smuggling and corruption. Lama was arrested late in July, 1987 on charges of accepting payoffs from prominent businessmen and criminal networks involved in smuggling not only narcotics but gold as well. Lama was imprisoned for a period of 5 years.

== Death in 2014 ==
Ex-I.G.P. DB Lama had been the chairman of the "Ex-Nepalese Policemen's Organization" until his demise (aged 84 years) on 25 March 2014 in Nuwakot. Nepali Congress Nuwakot President Jagadishwor Nar Singh informed that Lama was pronounced dead at Trishuli Hospital where he was rushed after he fell unconscious at around 10pm on Tuesday. The Nepal Police has paid heartfelt tributes to its former chief, Inspector General (IG) Dil Bahadur Lama, amidst a program at its headquarters, Naxal on the morning of March 28, 2014. Home Secretary Janardan Nepal, incumbent IGP Upendra Kant Aryal, former IGPs, sitting DIGs and senior officials of Nepal Police offered last respects to the late Lama by laying flowers and wreaths on his mortal remains. This is said to be the first event that the Nepal Police organised a condolence gathering for its departed members on the headquarters premises. The late Lama was presented a funeral guard of honour. The Nepal Police organised a condolence assembly for its former chief Lama at the request of his family. He is survived by two wives, three sons and two daughters.
