= Moti Lal Bohora =

14th Inspector General of Nepal Police

I.G.P. Motilal Bohara
- मोतीलाल बोहरा

14th Inspector General of Nepal Police
- In office February, 1993 – February 1997
- Monarch: King Birendra
- Prime Minister: Girija Prasad Koirala
- Preceded by: Ratna Shumsher J.B.R.
- Succeeded by: Achyut Krishna Kharel

Personal details
- Born: Achham
- Citizenship: Nepalese
- Occupation: Politician, police officer

Moti Lal Bohara (Nepali: मोतिलाल बोहरा) was the chief of Nepal Police from 1993 to 1997. He succeeded Ratna Shumsher J.B.R. as the police chief and was succeeded by Achyut Krishna Kharel.

It was during his tenure as chief that the "People's War" in Nepal began. He is the last known officer to have remained IGP for a full term (4 years).

In April, 2012, Bohara was convicted of corruption, and sentenced to imprisonment for 18 months.

As of 2014, former police chief Moti Lal Bohara was involved as founding member of Maalika Development Bank in Dhangadi.
