= Deepak Thapa =

31st Inspector General of Nepal Police

I.G.P. Deepak Thapa
- दिपक थापा
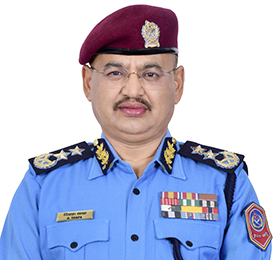

31st Inspector General of Nepal Police
- In office 18 March 2025 – 3 September 2025
- President: Ram Chandra Poudel
- Prime Minister: K. P. Sharma Oli
- Vice President: Ram Sahaya Yadav
- Preceded by: Basanta Bahadur Kunwar
- Succeeded by: Chandra Kuber Khapung

Personal details
- Born: 24 November 1971 (age 54)
- Spouse: Rupa Poudel Thapa
- Children: 3
- Education: Masters in Political Science; MPA
- Alma mater: Tribhuvan University
- Occupation: Police officer

Deepak Thapa (born 24 November 1971) was the 31st Inspector General of Nepal Police. On 18 March 2025, he was appointed Inspector General of Nepal Police, the highest police rank of Nepal Police. His term as Inspector General of Nepal Police lasted until 3 September 2025. He was succeeded by Chandra Kuber Khapung.

== Early life and education ==
Thapa was born on 24 November 1971 in Bhaktapur's Suryabinayak Municipality-8 Sipadol. He has studied LLB in Law, Masters in Political Science and MPA in Public Administration from Tribhuvan University.

== Career ==
Deepak Thapa, who joined Nepal Police in September 1995, as an inspector, became a Deputy Superintendent of Police (DSP) in August 2006, and later promoted to Superintendent of Police (SP) in July 2015. His rise continued with his promotion to Senior Superintendent of Police (SSP) in February 2019, and then to DIG in July 2022. Thapa was appointed an Additional Inspector General (AIG) in March 2023.
