= Pahal Singh Lama =

7th Inspector General of Nepal Police

- पहल सिंह लामा

7th Inspector General of Nepal Police
- In office December 1961 – July 1966
- Monarch: King Mahendra
- Prime Minister: Tulsi Giri
- Preceded by: Dhundi Raj Sharma
- Succeeded by: Rom Bahadur Thapa

Consul General of Calcutta
- Monarch: King Mahendra
- Prime Minister: Surya Bahadur Thapa
- Preceded by: Gahendra Shumsher Thapa
- Succeeded by: Rom Bahadur Thapa

Personal details
- Citizenship: Nepalese
- Occupation: Military Officer; Police officer Diplomat

Military service
- Allegiance: Nepal
- Branch/service: Rakshya Dal (Defense Army)
- Rank: Major

Pahal Singh Lama (Nepali: पहल सिंह लामा) was the chief of Nepal Police in the mid 1960s. He is well known for his contribution in establishment of the Mahendra Police Club in 1966 A.D. (2023 BS) with the help of the then S.P. Khadgajeet Baral, Harka Bahadur Thapa and the then DIGP Rom Bahadur Thapa, during his tenure as IGP.
Pahal Singh Lama had been appointed Consul General (1967-1971) of Calcutta, India by His Majesty's Government after his retirement from Nepal Police.
