= Narendra Kumar Gupta =

Nepalese politician

Honourable Narendra Kumar Gupta
- नरेन्द्रकुमार गुप्ता

Member of Parliament, Pratinidhi Sabha
- Incumbent
- Assumed office 26 March 2026
- Preceded by: Dhruba Bahadur Pradhan
- Constituency: Nawalparasi (Bardaghat Susta West) 2

Personal details
- Born: 4 October 1974 (age 52) Ramgram, Nawalparasi (West of Bardaghat Susta), Nepal
- Citizenship: Nepalese
- Party: Rastriya Swatantra Party (since 2025)
- Other political affiliations: Nepali Congress
- Parent: Ganesh Prasad Gupta (father)
- Profession: Politician

Narendra Kumar Gupta (Nepali: नरेन्द्रकुमार गुप्ता) is a Nepalese politician and former mayor of Ramgram Municipality. He currently serves as a member of parliament for the Rastriya Swatantra Party. He is a member of the 7th Pratinidhi Sabha elected from Nawalparasi (Bardaghat Susta West) 2 constituency in 2026 Nepalese General Election, securing 44,138 votes and defeating Bhim Bahadur Thapa Chhetri of the Nepali Congress.

== Early and personal life ==
Gupta was born in Ramgram, Nawalparasi (West of Bardaghat Susta) on October 4, 1974. He was born to Ganesh Prasad Gupta.

He completed his Bachelor's degree in management.

== Politics ==
He entered politics with the student movement in college. He joined the Nepal Student Union, the student wing of Nepali Congress, and became a regional president. He won the mayoral post of Ramgram Municipality as a Nepali Congress candidate in 2017 Nepalese local elections. He won the election by defeating Uma Shankar Chaudhary of the CPN (UML) by a margin of 1,326 votes. He contested for the same post in the 2022 Nepalese local elections but lost to Dhanpat Yadav of CPN (UML).

He left the Nepali Congress in 2025 and joined Rastriya Swatantra Party. He secured a party ticket to contest the 2026 Nepalese general election and won the election by receiving 44,138 votes, with a margin of 28,193 votes.

== Electoral performance ==
Election	Year	Constituency	Contested for	Political party	Result	Votes	% of votes	Ref.
Nepal general election	2026	Nawalparasi (Bardaghat Susta West) 2	Pratinidhi Sabha member	Rastriya Swatantra Party	Won	44,138	52.89%	
Nepal local election	2022	Ramgram Municipality	Mayor	Nepali Congress	Lost	6,267	24.92%	
Nepal local election	2017	Ramgram Municipality	Mayor	Nepali Congress	Won	5,856	32.06%	
