= Basanta Bahadur Kunwar =

Nepali police officer

I.G.P. Basanta Bahadur Kunwar
- वसन्तबहादुर कुँवर
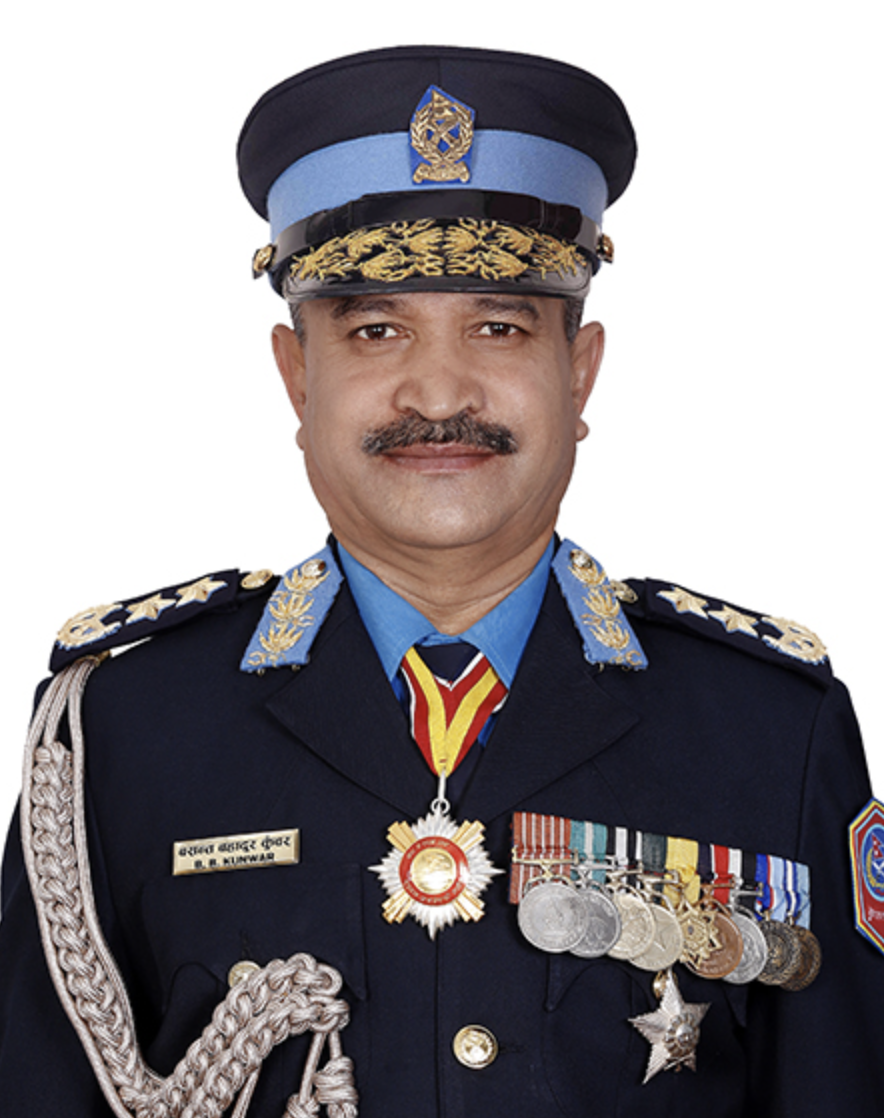

30th Inspector General of Nepal Police
- In office 24 March 2023 – 18 March 2025
- President: Ram Chandra Poudel
- Prime Minister: Pushpa Kamal Dahal
- Vice President: Nanda Kishor Pun
- Preceded by: Dhiraj Pratap Singh
- Succeeded by: Deepak Thapa

Personal details
- Born: 28 March 1970 (age 56)
- Spouse: Laxmi Parajuli Kunwar
- Education: MBA
- Alma mater: Tribhuvan University
- Occupation: Police officer

Basanta Bahadur Kunwar (born 28 March 1970) was the 30th Inspector General of Nepal Police. On 24 March 2023 he was appointed Inspector General of Nepal Police, the highest police rank of Nepal Police. Before that, he was heading Madhesh Province police office.

== Early life and education ==
Kunwar was born in Sandhikharka Municipality-1 of Arghakhanchi district on 28 March 1970. He joined the Nepal Police Service from the rank of Police Inspector on 19 March 1995. He completed his Master of Business Administration from Tribhuvan University.

== Career ==
Kunwar was promoted to Additional Inspector General of Police on 10 March 2024. The Council of Ministers on Friday appointed Kunwar the Inspector General of Nepal Police on 24 March 2024 by superseding other 4 officers. He retired on 18 March 2025 in line with the regulatory 30-year service term.

A victim of custodial torture from the Maoist insurgency objected when he was promoted to Additional IGP.
