= Rom Bahadur Thapa =

8th Inspector General of Nepal Police

- रोम बहादुर थापा

8th Inspector General of Nepal Police
- Monarch: King Mahendra
- Prime Minister: Surya Bahadur Thapa
- Preceded by: Pahal Singh Lama
- Succeeded by: Khadgajeet Baral

Consul General of Calcutta
- Monarch: King Birendra
- Prime Minister: Kirti Nidhi Bista
- Preceded by: Pahal Singh Lama
- Succeeded by: Madhav Raj Bhandari

Personal details
- Born: 24 April 1924 Burma
- Died: 26 October 1983 (aged 59)
- Citizenship: Nepalese
- Children: 4 sons, 1 daughter
- Occupation: Military Officer; Police officer Diplomat

Military service
- Allegiance: Nepal
- Branch/service: Rakshya Dal (Defense Army)
- Rank: Major

Rom Bahadur Thapa (1924–1983) is the first Inspector General of Nepal Police from the Magar ethnic group. Before joining the Nepal Police, he had been a Physical Training Instructor at the Military Academy in Burma (Myanmar). He had a reputation as a great war hero (of Burma) before joining Nepal Police. He was awarded the Burma Gallantry Medal for his heroic actions during World War II.

He is known to have been one of the only two officers to remain IGP for a period of 6 years, the other officer being his successor, Khadgajeet Baral. Rom Bahadur Thapa was appointed Consul General of Calcutta, India by His Majesty's Government after his retirement from Nepal Police.

He died by cancer at the age of 59 on 26 October 1983. He is survived four sons, a daughter, twelve grandchildren and three great grandsons and one great granddaughter.
