= Amrit Campus =

Science campus in Nepal

Coordinates: 27°43′05″N 85°18′46″E

- अमृत क्याम्पस
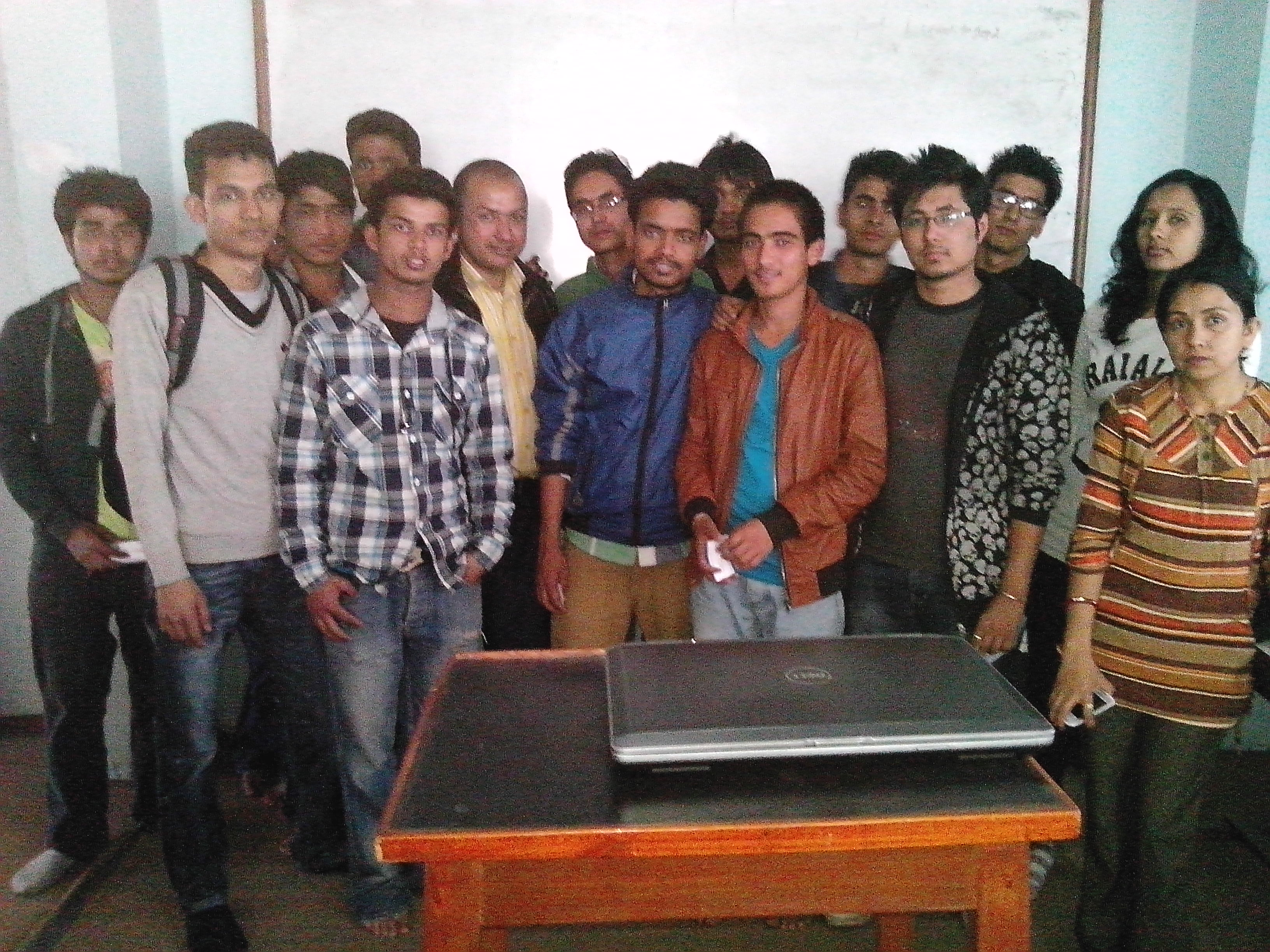
- Nepali Wikimedia with OSAC in Amrit Campus
- Other names: ASCOL or Amrit Science Campus
- Former names: Public Science College
- Type: Science and Technology College
- Established: 1962
- Founders: Founder Principal Amrit Prasad Pradhan
- Affiliations: Tribhuvan University
- Campus Chief: Dr. Hom Bahadur Baniya
- Academic staff: 151
- Administrative staff: 75
- Location: Kathmandu, Bagmati, Nepal
- Website: ac.tu.edu.np

Amrit Campus is the first science campus of Nepal, located in Lainchaur, Kathmandu. It was formerly known as Public Science College (PUSCOL). It was later renamed in the memory of Amrit Prasad Pradhan. Pradhan was born in 1918 at Thamel, Kathmandu, Nepal. He worked as the headmaster of Juddhodaya Public High School in Birgunj for two years and later joined Tri-Chandra College as a lecturer in chemistry. In 1962, he became the founding principal of Public Science College and began teaching as a professor of chemistry.

Pradhan helped to establish Amrit Campus with a goal of promoting the study of science and technology in Nepal. The campus benefited greatly from his enterprise, dedication and enthusiasm. While on a mission to the United States for academic reasons, he died in an air crash over Mont Blanc on January 24, 1966.

== Introduction ==
Amrit Campus (ASCOL), situated in the heart of Kathmandu Valley-Thamel, is one of the few pure science campus of the country. The campus is a governmental institution, with partial decentralization, affiliated to Tribhuvan University. This campus is one of the constituent campuses of Tribhuvan University. The number of students studying in ASCOL is nearly 1900.

== Notable alumni ==
=== Notable alumni in the field of Science and technology ===
- Prof. Dr. Bhanu Chandra Bajracharya - Mathematician, Former Chairperson of Mathematics Department of Amrit Campus, Author of several mathematics and statistics textbooks from school level to undergraduate level.
- Prof. Dr. Dayananda Bajracharya - Botanist, Former Chairman of Central Department of Botany, Former Rector of Tribhuvan University, Former President of Nepal Academy of Science and Technology (NAST) formerly called Royal Nepal Academy of Sciences (RONAST).
- Dr. Upendra Devkota
- Mr. Kulman Ghising - Managing Director, Nepal Electricity Authority
- Dr. Mahabir Pun - President of National Innovation, Leader of Nepal Wireless Project, Awardee: Ramon Magsaysay, Internet hall of fame, Ashoka Fellow, Scientist, Social entrepreneur

=== Notable alumni in other fields ===
- Dr. Baburam Bhattarai (Former Prime minister of Nepal and former leader of UCPN (Maoist))
- Jhala Nath Khanal (Former Prime minister of Nepal and leader of CPN (UML))
- Kul Man Ghising (Managing Director of Nepal Electricity Authority (NEA))
- Prakash Man Singh (Deputy Prime minister of Nepal in the Cabinet led by Prime minister Sushil Koirala, General secretary of Nepali Congress)
- Dr. Minendra Prasad Rijal (Leader of Nepali Congress)
- Kuber Singh Rana (Former IGP of Nepal Police)
- Pradip Paudel (Leader of Nepali Congress, Former President of Nepal Students' Union)

== List of Undergraduate Programs ==
- B.Sc. Environmental Science
- B.Sc. Microbiology
- B.Sc. Physics
- B.Sc. Botany
- B.Sc. Chemistry
- B.Sc. Mathematics
- B.Sc. Statistics
- B.Sc. Zoology
- Bachelor of Computer Science and Information Technology (BSc CSIT)
- Bachelors in Information Technology (BIT)

== List of Graduate Programs ==
- M.Sc. in Mathematics
- M.Sc. in Botany
- M.Sc. Chemistry
- M.Sc. Zoology
- M.Sc. Physics
- Master of Information Technology (MIT)
