= Gyan Bahadur Yakthumba =

3rd Inspector General of Nepal Police

IGP (Inspector General of Nepal Police) Gyan bahadur Yakthungba
- GB Limbu

3rd Inspector General of Nepal Police
- In office December 1953 – August 1955
- Monarch: King Tribhuvan
- Prime Minister: Matrika Prasad Koirala
- Preceded by: Nara Shumsher J.B.R.
- Succeeded by: Gopal Shumsher J.B.R.

Ambassador of Nepal to Burma
- In office 1965 – 1 March 1970
- Monarch: King Mahendra
- Prime Minister: Surya Bahadur Thapa
- Preceded by: Unknown
- Succeeded by: Unknown

Personal details
- Born: 16 March 1920 Silange Basti
- Died: 1 March 1970 (aged 49)
- Citizenship: Nepalese
- Party: Nepali Congress
- Spouse: Indira Yakthumba Limbu founder of Gyanodaya Bal Batika School
- Children: 2 sons, 2 daughters Madhukar Yakthumba (eldest son), Nirakar Yakthumba (youngest son), Bharati Yakthumba (eldest daughter), Poonam Yakthumba (youngest daughter)
- Occupation: Military officer Police officer Diplomat
- Awards: Gorkha Dakshin Bahu Class I (1964); Tri Shakti Patta Class I (1967)

Military service
- Allegiance: Nepal
- Branch/service: Fourth Regiment of Burmese Army; Rakshya Dal (Defense Army)
- Rank: Lieutenant in the Burmese Army; Major in the Defense Army

Gyan Bahadur Yakthumba Limbu (16 March 1920 – 1 March 1970) was a Nepali police officer and diplomat. He joined the Nepali Police with the rank of Major and was promoted to the rank of Inspector General of Nepal Police, after succeeding Nara Shumsher J.B.R. as the police chief. He served as the Inspector General of the Nepalese Police force from December 1953 to August 1956. He was the third chief of Nepal Police, and after retirement served as an envoy to Burma.

The present Gyanodaya Bal Batika School in Kathmandu, Nepal, was built in 1975 in memory of him by his wife Indira Yakthumba.
