= National Investigation Department =

Intelligence Agency of Nepal

- राष्ट्रिय अनुसन्धान विभाग

Agency overview
- Formed: 1952
- Jurisdiction: Government of Nepal
- Motto: National Security
- Agency executive: Chief Investigation Director
- Parent agency: Office of the Prime Minister and Council of Ministers
- Website: nidept.gov.np

National Investigation Department (NID) (Nepali: राष्ट्रिय अनुसन्धान विभाग) is the main intelligence agency of Nepal collecting information about country's public security, economic crimes, corruption, domestic and cross border terrorism, money laundering, narcotics, and human trafficking. NID works under the Office of The Prime Minister and Council of Ministers .The government has appointed Tekendra Karki as chief and principal investigation director of the National Investigation Department (NID), Nepal's sole intelligence agency.

NID is one of the four major security-related agencies in Nepal, other being Nepal Police, Armed Police Force, and Nepal Army. Central Investigation Bureau, a branch of Nepal police and Directorate of Military Intelligence (Nepal), a branch of Nepal Army. It has major connections to agencies from other countries.
