= Devendra Raj Kandel =

Nepalese Politician (born 1957)

Honourable Devendra Raj Kandel
- देवेन्द्र राज कंडेल

Member of the Parliament, Pratinidhi Sabha
- In office 4 March 2018 – 18 September 2022
- Preceded by: Constituency established
- Constituency: Nawalparasi West 2
- Succeeded by: Dhruba Bahadur Pradhan
- In office October 1994 – May 2002
- Preceded by: Triyugi Narayan Chaudhary
- Succeeded by: Chinak Kurmi
- Constituency: Nawalparasi 4

Minister of State for Home Affairs
- In office 2000–2002

Personal details
- Born: 17 March 1957 (age 69) Nawalparasi District
- Party: Nepali Congress
- Nickname: Munna babu

Devendra Raj Kandel (born March 19, 1957, in Rampurwa) is a Nepalese politician, former minister, and a Member of House Of Representatives (Nepal) elected from Nawalparasi-4, Province No. 5. He is the member of Nepali Congress. He is also elected as chairman of the management committee of a college in India.
