= Thakur Prasad Gyawaly =

27th Inspector General of Nepal Police (born 1965)

I.G.P. Thakur Prasad Gyawaly
- ठाकुर प्रसाद ज्ञवाली
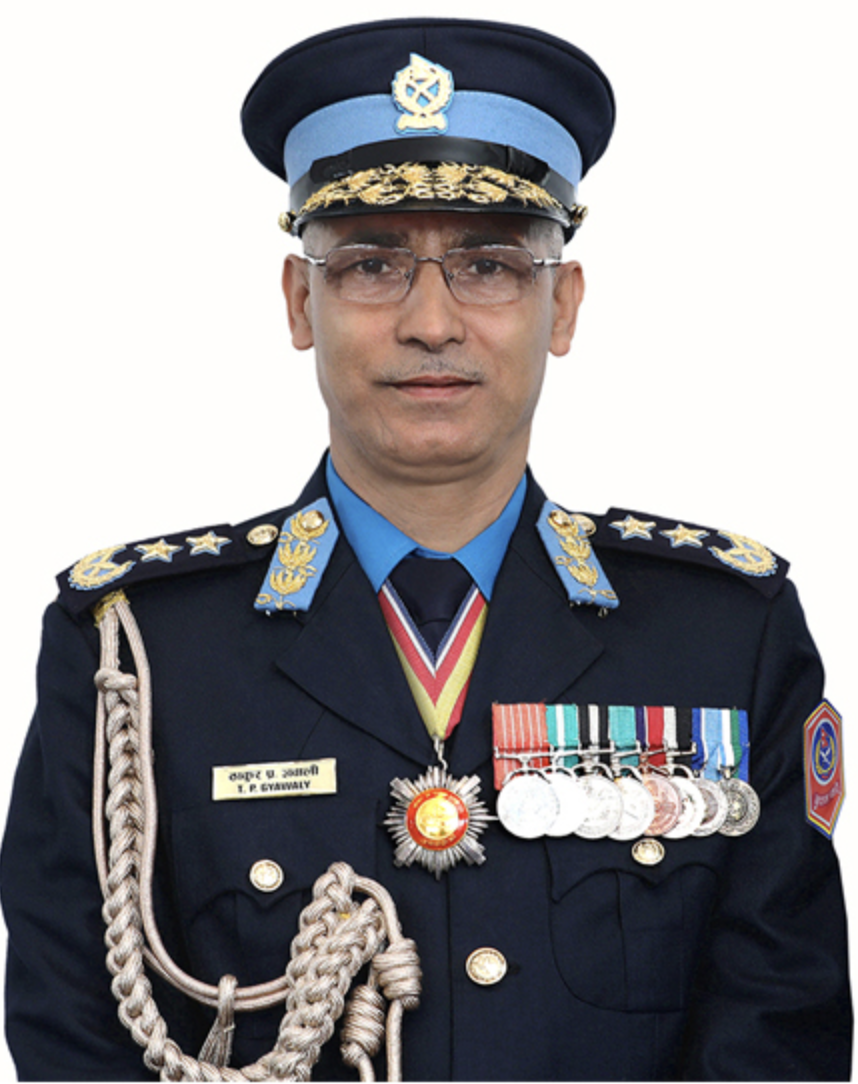

27th Inspector General of Nepal Police
- In office 12 February 2020 – 6 July 2020
- President: Bidhya Devi Bhandari
- Prime Minister: Khadga Prasad Oli
- Vice President: Nanda Kishor Pun
- Preceded by: Sarbendra Khanal
- Succeeded by: Shailesh Thapa Chhetri

Personal details
- Born: 14 October 1965 (age 61) Pyuthan, Nepal
- Citizenship: Nepalese
- Spouse: Gyanu Gyawaly
- Children: 2
- Education: Tribhuvan University
- Occupation: Police Officer

Thakur Prasad Gyawaly (Nepali: ठाकुर प्रसाद ज्ञवाली; born 14 October 1965) is 27th Inspector General of Nepal Police. He was appointed the Inspector General of Nepal Police after succeeding Sarbendra Khanal on February 12, 2020 by the cabinet decision of the Government of Nepal.
