= Bharat Gurung =

Lt.Colonel Bharat Gurung

Aide de Camp (A.D.C.)

Personal details
- Citizenship: Nepalese
- Profession: Military Officer

Retd. Lt.Colonel Bharat Gurung (Nepali: भरत गुरुङ) had served as the Royal A.D.C. to Late Prince Dhirendra Shah of Nepal in the 1980s until his imprisonment in 1987 for his involvement in drug trafficking and smuggling. Gurung was prosecuted along with Bhim Prasad Gauchan and DB Lama on seven accounts, earning him a twenty-year sentence in jail and a fine of several millions of rupees. He was found guilty of connivance in the attempted murder of a journalist, drug trafficking, illegal foreign exchange transactions, unauthorized possession of weapons, and gold and watch smuggling. The prosecution established that about 1,500 bars of gold, 5,500 watches and 90 pistol bullets were found in his possession.
