= Kuber Singh Rana =

23rd Inspector General of Nepal Police

I.G.P. Kuber Singh Rana
- कुवेर सिंह राना

23rd Inspector General of Nepal Police
- In office 13 September 2012 – 16 November 2013
- President: Dr. Ram Baran Yadav
- Prime Minister: Dr. Baburam Bhattarai
- Vice President: Parmanand Jha
- Preceded by: Rabindra Pratap Shah
- Succeeded by: Upendra Kant Aryal

Personal details
- Born: 21 July 1960 (age 66) Boudhagumba, Palpa District, Nepal
- Citizenship: Nepalese
- Spouse: Rita Rana
- Children: 1 Son, 1 Daughter
- Education: Tribhuvan University
- Occupation: Police Officer

Kuber Singh Rana (Nepali: कुवेर सिंह राना) was the 23rd Inspector General of the Nepal Police. He was promoted to the Inspector General of Police by the government of Nepal after succeeding Rabindra Pratap Shah as the police chief on September 13, 2012. He joined Nepal Police on 16 November 1983 as Police Inspector.

== Biography ==
Kuber Singh Rana was born in Baugha Gumha of Palpa district on 21 July 1960. He graduated from Tribhuvan University with a Bachelor of Arts degree. Rana joined the Nepal Police on 16 November 1983 as an Inspector of Police.

He was appointed Additional Inspector General of Police in 2011 and was assigned the police command of the Kathmandu Valley as the Commissioner of the Metropolitan Police Office, Kathmandu. During his tenure, he focused on resource management and mobilization to support service delivery and maintenance of law and order within the valley. Rana served as In-Charge of seven District Police Offices and two Zonal Police Offices. He was promoted to the rank of Deputy Inspector General of Police in 2008 and served as Chief of the Western Regional Police Office, Pokhara.

In his professional career, Rana had participated in two dozen specialized training courses, within the country and abroad. In recognition of his service, he has been awarded 4 orders, 8 decorations and 3 medals on various occasions. He has received several appreciation letters for his performance.

Rana has stated that his goals as chief of Nepal Police are to deliver fair and competent police service across the country, as well as ensuring protection and promotion of human rights along with zero tolerance against corruption and irregularity, emphasizing police reform to ensure a professional police service in the country.

== Earlier assignments and medals ==
- Metropolitan Police Commissioner
- Chief, Weastern Region Police Office, Pokhara
- Chief, Narcotics Drug Control Law Enforcement Unit
- Chief of several District Police Offices.
- Kuber Singh Rana has been awarded 16 medals/awards for his police duty.

== Controversy ==
Two human rights groups have opposed Rana's appointment, as he was the Chief of Police in the Dhanusa District of Nepal, where five students were forcibly disappeared and found dead in an extrajudicial killing in 2003. As of 2012, he (among others) was being investigated for alleged involvement in the killings, making his appointment to Inspector General in violation of international standards.
