= Prakash Aryal =

25th Inspector General of Nepal Police

I.G.P. Prakash Aryal
- प्रकाश अर्याल
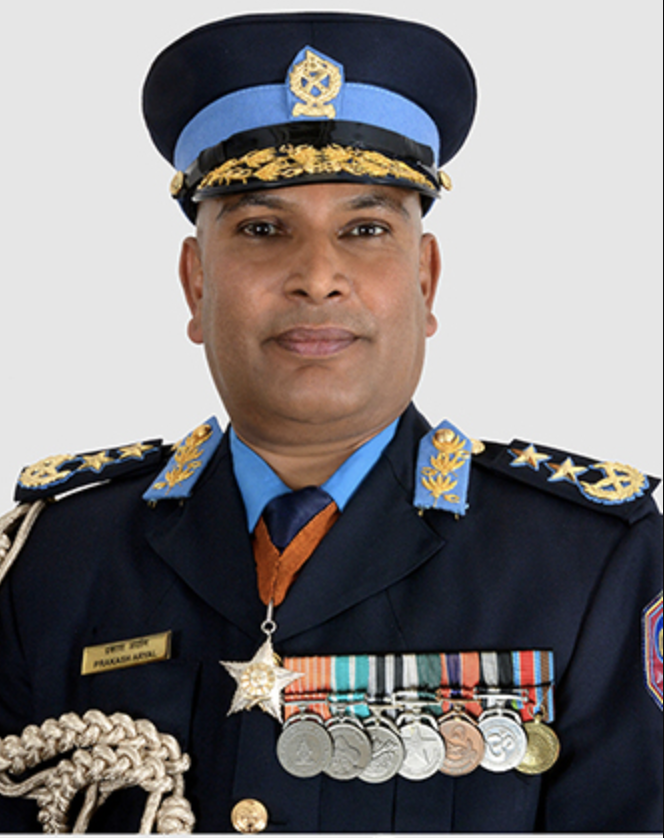

25th Inspector General of Nepal Police
- In office 10 April 2017 – 11 April 2018
- President: Bidhya Devi Bhandari
- Prime Minister: Pushpa Kamal Dahal
- Vice President: Nanda Kishor Pun
- Preceded by: Upendra Kant Aryal
- Succeeded by: Sarbendra Khanal

Personal details
- Born: 28 June 1963 (age 63) Dang, Nepal
- Citizenship: Nepalese
- Education: Tribhuvan University
- Occupation: Police Officer

Prakash Aryal (pronunciation: [prʌkas ʌrjal]) (born 28 June 1963) was the 25th Inspector General of Nepal Police. He was appointed to the position on 10 April 2017, succeeding Upendra Kant Aryal, following a cabinet decision by the Government of Nepal. Aryal secured the role by earning 154.2 points in a work performance evaluation conducted by the Supreme Court of Nepal, narrowly surpassing his closest rival, DIG Nawaraj Silwal, who received 152.467 points. This appointment came after the Court revoked the February 12 decision of Nepal Government to appoint DIG Jaya Bahadur Chand after being challenged by senior-most DIG Nawaraj Silwal, Inspector General of Police (IGP).
