= Nawalparasi (Bardaghat Susta West) 2 =

Parliamentary constituency in Nepal

- Parliamentary constituency
- Nawalparasi (Bardaghat Susta West) 2 in Lumbini Province
- Province: Lumbini Province
- District: Nawalparasi (West of Bardaghat Susta)

Current constituency
- Created: 2017
- Party: Rastriya Swatantra Party
- Member of Parliament: Narendra Kumar Gupta

Nawalparasi (Bardaghat Susta West) 2 is one of two parliamentary constituencies of Nawalparasi (West of Bardaghat Susta) district in Nepal. This constituency came into existence on the Constituency Delimitation Commission (CDC) report submitted on 31 August 2017.

== Incorporated areas ==
Nawalparasi (Bardaghat Susta West) 2 incorporates Sunuwal Municipality, Ramgram Municipality, Palhi Nandan Rural Municipality and wards 1, 2 and 3 of Sarawal Rural Municipality.

== Assembly segments ==
It encompasses the following Lumbini Provincial Assembly segment

- Nawalparasi (Bardaghat Susta West) 2(A)
- Nawalparasi (Bardaghat Susta West) 2(B)

== Members of Parliament ==
=== Parliament/Constituent Assembly ===
Election	Member	Party
2017	Devendra Raj Kandel	Nepali Congress
2022	Dhruba Bahadur Pradhan	Rastriya Prajatantra Party
2026	Narendra Kumar Gupta	Rastriya Swatantra Party

=== Provincial Assembly ===
==== 2(A) ====
Election	Member	Party
2017	Baijanath Chaudhary	CPN (Unified Marxist–Leninist)
May 2018	Baijanath Chaudhary	Nepal Communist Party

==== 2(B) ====
Election	Member	Party
2017	Baijanath Kalwar	Nepali Congress

== Election results ==
=== Election in the 2020s ===
==== 2026 general election ====
Candidate	Party	Votes	%
Narendra Kumar Gupta	Rastriya Swatantra Party	44,138	52.89
Bhim Bahadur Thapa Chhetri	Nepali Congress	15,945	19.11
Devendra Yadav	PSP, Nepal	7,212	8.64
Dhruba Bahadur Pradhan	Rastriya Prajatantra Party	4,691	5.62
Others		11,470	13.74
Total		83,456	100.00
Valid votes		83,456	93.86
Invalid/blank votes		5,459	6.14
Total votes		88,915	100.00
Registered voters/turnout		131,077	67.83
Majority		28,193	
Rastriya Swatantra Party gain			

==== 2022 general election ====
Candidate	Party	Votes	%
Dhruba Bahadur Pradhan	Rastriya Prajatantra Party	34,764	41.82
Devendra Raj Kandel	Nepali Congress	19,594	23.57
Dipendra Kumar Adhikari	CPN (UML)	14,502	17.45
Madan Lal Paudel	Rastriya Swatantra Party	5,531	6.65
Bal Govinda Chaudhary	Janamat Party	4,612	5.55
Chandrika Devi Chaudhary	Nagrik Unmukti Party	1,848	2.22
Others		2,271	2.73
Total		83,122	100.00
Majority		15,170	
Rastriya Prajatantra Party gain			

=== Election in the 2010s ===
==== 2017 legislative elections ====
Party	Candidate	Votes
Nepali Congress	Devendra Raj Kandel	34,130
Communist Party of Nepal (Maoist Centre)	Ghanshyam Yadav Ahir	23,898
Rastriya Janata Party Nepal	Govinda Prasad Chaudhary	16,928
Federal Socialist Forum, Nepal	Birendra Prasad Chaudhary	1,136
Others		1,824
Result	Congress gain	
Source: Election Commission

==== 2017 Nepalese provincial elections ====
===== 2(A) =====
Party	Candidate	Votes
CPN (Unified Marxist–Leninist)	Baijanath Chaudhary	20,907
Nepali Congress	Gun Nidhi Tiwari	17,115
Rastriya Janata Party Nepal	Satrajit Yadav	3,368
Others		2,104
Result	CPN (UML) gain	
Source: Election Commission

===== 2(B) =====
Party	Candidate	Votes
Nepali Congress	Baijanath Kalwar	14,515
Rastriya Janata Party Nepal	Nagendra Agrahari	10,436
Communist Party of Nepal (Maoist Centre)	Kanhaiya Kohar	5,873
Federal Socialist Forum, Nepal	Ram Bachan Ahir	2,339
Others		823
Result	Congress gain	
Source: Election Commission

== See also ==
- List of parliamentary constituencies of Nepal
