= Dhiraj Pratap Singh =

Nepal Police officer

I.G.P. Dhiraj Pratap Singh
- धिरज प्रताप सिंह
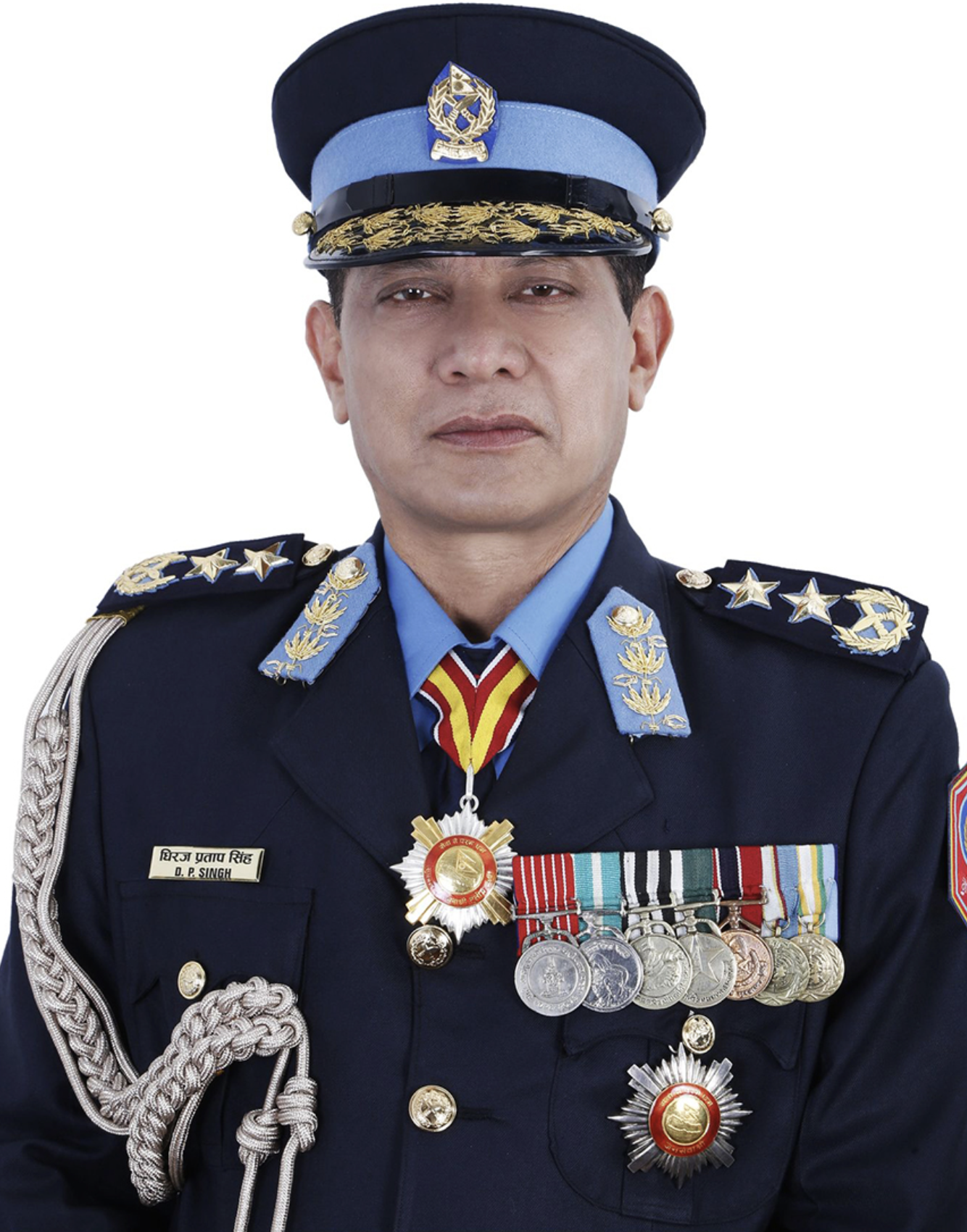

29th Inspector General of Nepal Police
- In office 3 May 2022 – 24 March 2023
- President: Ram Chandra Poudel
- Prime Minister: Sher Bahadur Deuba Pushpa Kamal Dahal
- Vice President: Nanda Kishor Pun
- Preceded by: Shailesh Thapa Chhetri
- Succeeded by: Basanta Bahadur Kunwar

Personal details
- Born: 6 November 1967 (age 58) Narayan Municipality Dailekh, Nepal
- Citizenship: Nepalese
- Children: 2
- Education: Postgraduate
- Alma mater: Tribhuvan University
- Occupation: Police officer

Dhiraj Pratap Singh (Nepali: धिरज प्रताप सिंह) (born 6 November 1967) is the 29th Inspector General of Nepal Police. He was appointed the Inspector General of Nepal Police after succeeding Shailesh Thapa Chhetri on 3 May 2022 following a cabinet decision.

== Biography ==
Singh joined Nepal Police as an Inspector on March 24, 1993. He was also serving as the incumbent Head of INTERPOL National Central Bureau, Kathmandu as an ex officio. Singh was promoted as Additional IG in March 2022. Prior to joining as IGP, he served in Central Investigation Bureau. Before that, he was chief of the police force in Madhes Province as a Deputy Inspector General. As DIG, Singh also led the Central Bureau of Investigation. As the Superintendent of Police, Singh commanded the Dang district.

The appointment of Singh is apparently a violation of the seniority order in the Nepal police as he was the third-ranked officer in the police department after Bishwa Raj Pokharel and Sahakul Thapa. But he got promoted by superseding them. In this context Pokharel had filed a writ petition to the Supreme Court demanding that the government’s decision to promote his junior Dhiraj Pratap Singh, even though Pokharel’s writ has been quashed by Nepal Supreme court.
