= Upendra Kant Aryal =

24th Inspector General of Nepal Police

I.G.P. Upendra Kant Aryal
- उपेन्द्र कान्त अर्याल

24th Inspector General of Nepal Police
- In office 16 November 2013 – 10 April 2017
- President: Dr. Ram Baran Yadav; Bidhya Devi Bhandari
- Prime Minister: Sushil Koirala
- Vice President: Parmanand Jha
- Preceded by: Kuber Singh Rana
- Succeeded by: Prakash Aryal

Personal details
- Born: 14 January 1962 (age 64) Siraha, Nepal
- Citizenship: Nepalese
- Education: Tribhuvan University
- Occupation: Police Officer

Upendra Kant Aryal was the 24th Inspector General of Nepal Police. He was appointed the Chief of Nepal Police after succeeding Kuber Singh Rana on 16 November 2013 by the cabinet decision made on 11 November 2013. With this decision, he was also the Head of the National Central Bureau (NCB), Kathmandu, INTERPOL.

Born on 14 January 1962 in Siraha District, IGP Aryal completed his bachelor's degree in Humanities and Social Sciences from Tribhuvan University. After completing his academic degree, he commenced his career in Nepal Police as an Inspector on 15 February 1987. He was later promoted to Deputy Superintendent of Police (DSP) in 1993, Superintendent of Police (SP) in 2001 and Senior Superintendent of Police (SSP) in 2006.

Upon his promotion to Deputy Inspector General (DIG) on 7 October 2009, he was assigned to the Operation Department, Police Headquarters (PHQ) and later took command of the Western Regional Police Office, Pokhara where his office was awarded the Police Baton 2068 for their outstanding work efficiency in the inter-regional competition. His other responsibilities as a DIG include Director of Central Investigation Bureau, Chief of Metropolitan Traffic Division, and Chief of Eastern Regional Police Office, Biratnagar. Adjudging his strategic and managerial acumen, he was appointed the Additional Inspector General (AIG) of Police on 31 October 2013. As the Chief of Operation Department, he headed the Central Election Cell of Nepal Police and was involved in the Strategic Security Planning Management for Constituent Assembly Election 2013 despite his short spell.

In his 27 years of professional service, he took part in numerous national and international trainings, programs and workshops. In recognition of his outstanding service, he was decorated with the Suprabal Janasewa Shree Padak from Rt. Hon. President of Nepal, Dr. Ram Baran Yadav. In addition to these honours, he was also bestowed with 11 other decorations and medals. He was also awarded by the Letter of appreciation from INTERPOL in 2010 for his outstanding performance to control trans-international crimes.

IGP Aryal stressed teamwork and partnership to be the driving force for achieving these goals through mutual trust and respect with all members of the organization. He believed that collective initiation and constructive support of all stakeholders of the society as the foundation to propel Nepal Police as a more accountable and serviceable institution of the state.
