= Achyut Krishna Kharel =

Ex-IGP, Nepal

I.G.P. Achyut Krishna Kharel
- अच्युतकृष्ण खरेल
- Born: 11 March 1947 (age 79); Kharelthok, Kavrepalanchok District, Nepal
- Other name: Rai bahun
- Predecessor: Motilal Bohora Dhruba Bahadur Pradhan
- Successor: Dhruba Bahadur Pradhan Pradeep SJB Rana
- Police career
- Country: Nepal
- Department: Nepal Police
- Service years: 30
- Status: Retired
- Rank: Inspector General of Police (I.G.P.)

Achyut Krishna Kharel (Nepali: अच्युतकृष्ण खरेल) was the chief of Nepal Police during the Maoist's Insurgency.

In the late 1970s, Kharel served as the captain of the Nepal Police Football Team.

== First tenure as police chief ==
In early 1997, after Motilal Bohora's retirement from Nepal Police, Kharel was appointed Inspector General of Police (IGP). However, within 36 days of his appointment, he was transferred to the position of the chief of National Investigation Department and was briefly replaced by his competitor Dhruba Bahadur Pradhan from April 3, 1997, for a period of around 8 months.

== Second tenure as police chief ==
On December 11, 1997, Kharel was reinstated as IGP. This way, Kharel got the unique opportunity to serve as the chief of Nepal Police for two terms.

In IGP Kharel's second tenure as police chief, "Operation Kilo Cera II" was initiated during the Maoist's Insurgency, i.e. in the late 1990s.

Kharel's second tenure as the police chief was marked by major factionalism and favoritism within the police force, disfavouring personnel allegedly close to his predecessors Motilal Bohora and Dhruba Bdr. Pradhan. Former Deputy Superintendent of Police (DSP) Anand Puri has stated in his memoirs titled 'Experiences with 9 IGPs' that 'Kharel was influenced by brahminism, and so, police personnel from the brahmin community were extremely favored during his tenure.' In his memoirs, Puri has stated that upon asking the then Prime Minister late Girija Prasad Koirala regarding the reason for him not being included in the SP's promotion list, Koirala had stated that IGP Kharel had not recommended Puri for the promotion and that Koirala had told Puri, 'Then again, you belong to another IGP's (Dhruba Bdr. Pradhan) faction.'

In his autobiography published in 2018, Kharel has claimed that during his second tenure as the police chief, he collected a total amount of Rs. (NPR) 40 lakhs as election budget (member of parliament) for the political parties, via his subordinate Bharat GC, who had been serving as the in-charge of the Kathmandu Valley Crime Investigation Section. From this collected sum, Kharel then gave Rs. 30 lakhs to then president of Nepali Congress and Prime Minister of Nepal late Girija Prasad Koirala and Rs. 10 lakhs to the Communist Party of Nepal (UML), to manage their election costs.
