= Om Bikram Rana =

19th Inspector General of Nepal Police

I.G.P. Om Bikram Rana
- ओम बिक्रम राणा
- Police career
- Country: Nepal
- Department: Nepal Police
- Service years: 1978-2008
- Rank: Inspector General of Police (I.G.P.)

Om Bikram Rana is the 19th IGP of Nepal. In September, 2006, he was appointed Inspector General of Nepal Police, the highest police rank of Nepal Police. He was preceded by Shyam Bhakta Thapa as the police chief and was succeeded by Hem Bahadur Gurung. His term had begun on September 18, 2006 and had ended in September 2008.

He was sentenced to two years in prison for corruption by the Supreme Court in the Sudan Armoured Police Carrier scam.
