= Ramesh Chand Thakuri =

21st Inspector General of Nepal Police

I.G.P. Ramesh Chand Thakuri
- रमेश चन्द ठकुरी
- Born: 1949 (age 76–77); Nawalparasi District, Nepal
- Police career
- Country: Nepal
- Department: Nepal Police
- Rank: Inspector General of Police

Ramesh Chand Thakuri is a former Nepalese police official. He was the 21st Inspector General of Nepal Police. He was convicted for his part in the Rs 280 million Sudan Scam. Thakuri was succeeded by Rabindra Pratap Shah in early June, 2012.

== Scam ==
Thakuri was sent to jail in early 2009 after he failed to furnish a Rs 7 million bail. A special court sent him to jail on a charge leveled by the Commission for the Investigation of Abuse of Authority (CIAA) for the scam in purchase of armored personnel carriers and logistics for Nepal Police peacekeepers with U.N. in the African state.

Three police chiefs and 34 other police officers were charged in the scam.
