= Ratna Shumsher J.B.R. =

13th Inspector General of Nepal Police

I.G.P. Ratna Shumsher J.B.R.
- रत्नसम्शेर राणा
- Predecessor: Hem Bahadur Singh
- Successor: Moti Lal Bohora
- Police career
- Country: Nepal
- Department: Nepal Police
- Service years: 1963-1993
- Rank: Inspector General of Nepal Police (I.G.P.)

Ratna Shumsher J.B.R. was the Inspector General of Police of Nepal Police from 1990 to 1993. He had also been the first Additional Inspector General of Nepal Police (AIGP). He was preceded by Hem Bahadur Singh was succeeded by Moti Lal Bohora as the police chief.

Ratna Shumsher J.B.R. was described by fellow police officers as a very honest police officer.
