= National Police Academy (Nepal) =

Location
- Kathmandu, Bagmati Province; Nepal; 27.7338°N 85.3282°E

Information
- Type: Police training
- Motto: Center for Excellence
- Established: 1956
- Director: AIGP Mukunda Raj Acharya
- Website: npa.nepalpolice.gov.np

National Police Academy is the main training academy of the Nepal Police. It was established with the Police Regulation of 1993. CPTC was founded 1956. The Police Academy is located in Kathmandu, capital city of Nepal. It was formerly known as Central Police Training Centre (CPTC) established on the onset with the police regulation of 1993. Central Police Training Centre (CPTC) was laid its foundation in 1956 and has its distinction as only an institute to train the police force. The current executive director of the academy is Tek Prasad Rai

In its inception, CPTC had remained engaged in training only the constable level within limited resources and training facilities. Now, the changing trend of policing as per the changed political context has demanded well versed and qualified police officers to meet the public expectations. Its prime responsibility apparently lies in developing professional competency of the senior police officers through conducting foundation as well as advanced training courses. To accomplish this objective needs sufficient and well-trained police personnel which is impossible to envisage without the efforts and the contribution of the training institute. NPA is solely responsible for conducting basic and advanced programs of the police officers. NPA relentlessly indulged in new scientific methods and advanced technological adaptations to ensure the new concept of policing. The introduction of improved administrative practices focuses on enhancing qualitative instructors and its training to bring about improvements in administrative, investigative, and overall improvement on police professionals.

== Objectives ==
The main objectives of NPA are:

1. To conduct foundation training (induction courses) by offering developmental opportunities to senior police officers and technical police officers.
2. To prepare police instructors required for the entire police training system in Nepal Police and provide consultancy services.
3. To offer and undertake advanced training for senior police officers in the field of leadership, management, and administration, proactive policing, community policing trainer's training, etc.
4. To extend prospective and substantive relationships with universities in the relevant subjects and to award academic degrees to the trainees.
5. To organize workshops, seminars, symposiums, conferences, and short courses on policing issues.
6. To carry out quality research activities (required by Police Headquarters-PHQ) or to act as a research faculty (qualitative research on behalf of PHQ) regarding the police profession to develop analytical capability.
7. To extend assistance and advice to police headquarters i.e. consultancy service rendered to PHQ in formulating training policies.

== Human Resource Development ==
NPA primarily does concern with human resource development activities as identified on an organizational level to promote professional skills by running different quality training programs. Moreover, it focuses on HRD aspects with an objective to improve its role in the criminal justice system.

== School of Music ==
The NPA School of Music was established in 1952 as the Central Police Band. In order to formulate the service-oriented police band, the public was facilitated the band service since 1964. In 2006, the band was renamed Nepal Police Music Academy (NPMA). Today, the NPMA organizes affiliated bands stationed in the following areas: Biratnagar, Bharatpur, Butwal, Nepalgunj, and Dipayal. Nationwide, there are a total of 415 musicians. The sub-bands have 31 musicians each while the central band at the Police Academy in Maharajgung has 260 band members.
