= Dhruba Bahadur Pradhan =

Nepali politician

I.G.P. MP Dhruba Bahadur Pradhan
- ध्रुव बहादुर प्रधान

Member of Parliament, Pratinidhi Sabha
- Incumbent
- Assumed office 2023
- Preceded by: Devendra Raj Kandel
- Constituency: Nawalparasi West 2

Vice president of Rastriya Prajatantra Party
- Incumbent
- Assumed office 2021
- President: Rajendra Lingden

President of Nepal Olympic Committee (NOC)
- In office 2006–2014
- Preceded by: Rukma Shamsher Rana
- Succeeded by: Jeevan Ram Shrestha

17th Inspector General of Nepal Police
- In office March 1996 – December 1996
- Monarch: King Birendra
- Preceded by: Achyut Krishna Kharel
- Succeeded by: Achyut Krishna Kharel

Personal details
- Born: 1 January 1949 (age 77) Kathmandu, Nepal
- Citizenship: Nepalese
- Party: Rastriya Prajatantra Party
- Parents: Rudra Bahadur Pradhan (father); Jagat Kumari Pradhan (mother)
- Education: Tribhuvan University
- Occupation: Politician; Police officer
- Awards: Police long service Medal; Tri Shakti Patta Class III; Gorkha Dakshin Bahu Class II; German Order; Birendra Aishwarya Medal

Dhruba Bahadur Pradhan is a Nepali politician belonging to Rastriya Prajatantra Party. Pradhan had been the chief of Nepal Police during the Maoist's Insurgency.

Pradhan is the current Vice president of Rastriya Prajatantra Party elected from the 2021 general convention of Rastriya Prajatantra Party.

== Police career ==
Dhruba Bahadur Pradhan was appointed Inspector General of Police (IGP) in 1997 A.D., but was then replaced by his predecessor, Achyut Krishna Kharel, due to certain "political instabilities (Bam Dev Gautam)", before again becoming IGP.

== Political life ==
Former IGP Dhruba Bahadur Pradhan, is currently Vice president of Rastriya Prajatantra Party. Pradhan was elected as the Vice president of Rastriya Prajatantra Party from the Kamal Thapa panel.
