= Nara Shumsher Jang Bahadur Rana =

2nd Inspector General of Nepal Police

I.G.P. Nara Shumsher Jang Bahadur Rana
- नर शमशेर ज.ब.रा.
- Born: 16 December 1911; Jawalakhel Durbar, Jawalakhel
- Died: 16 December 1911 (age 20); Nara Dera, Kathmandu
- Spouse(s): Uma Rajya Laxmi; Prabha Rajya Laxmi
- Children: Four sons and two daughters, including: Princess Princep Shah of Nepal; Princess Helen Shah of Nepal
- Relatives: Sir Bahadur Shamsher Jang Bahadur Rana (father); Chandra Rajya Laxmi (mother)
- Military career
- Allegiance: Nepal
- Branch: Nepal Police
- Rank: Inspector General of Police (I.G.P.)

Inspector General of Nepal Police (I.G.P.)
- In office 1950 A.D. – 1953 A.D.
- Monarch: King Tribhuwan Shah
- Prime Minister: Mohan Shumsher J.B.R.
- Preceded by: Toran Shumsher J.B.R.
- Succeeded by: GB Yakthumba

Nara Shumsher Jang Bahadur Rana, KCVO, was the second police chief of Nepal Police after the force was established in the year 2007 B.S. (1951 C.E.). He remained chief for two years before Gyan Bahadur Yakthumba succeeded him as police chief.

Nara Shumsher J.B.R. was honored by the government of Nepal as the Father of Nepali Sports for his contribution, both as a player and an official, to Nepali sports. He was the first Nepali player to get 'Merit Award' from the Olympic Council of Asia.

Praised in the sporting fraternity, Rana, however, is despised by the common people for his involvement in the killing of four martyrs Shukraraj Shastri, Dharma Bhakta Mathema, Dashrath Chand and Gangalal Shrestha. He supervised the killing of the four martyrs and is believed to have shot Gangalal and Dashrath Chand himself, after the executioner deputed to shoot them hesitated.

== Notable published works ==
- “Janarala Nara Samsera Janga Bahadura Ranako Jivani: Uhamkai Juvani” (2006).

== Honours ==
=== National Honours ===
- Member of the Order of the Star of Nepal, 1st class.
- Member of the Order of Om Rama Patta.
- Member of the Order of the Three Divine Powers, 1st class.
- Member of the Order of Gurkha Right Hand, 1st class.
- Member of the Order of the Footprint of Nepal, 2nd class (23 October 2001).

=== Foreign Honours ===
- Honorary Knight Commander of the Royal Victorian Order [KCVO] (United Kingdom, 26 February 1961).
- Merit Award of the Olympic Council of Asia.
