= Pradip Shumsher J.B.R. =

Nepalese police officer (1946/1947–2025)

I.G.P. Pradip Shumsher Jung Bahadur Rana
- प्रदीप शम्शेर राणा
- Born: 1946 or 1947
- Died: 12 April 2025 (aged 78)
- Police career
- Country: Nepal
- Department: Nepal Police
- Service years: 1999–2001
- Rank: Inspector General of Police (I.G.P.)

Pradip Shumsher Jung Bahadur Rana (1946 or 1947 – 12 April 2025) was a chief of Nepal Police, who served as the Inspector general of police from September 1999 to December 2001. He was preceded by Achyut Krishna Kharel and was succeeded by Shyam Bhakta Thapa as the police chief. During his tenure as police chief, he introduced Mahendra Police Swimming Complex, which cost a budget of Rs. 7 crores. The Nepalese royal massacre also occurred during his tenure as police chief. Shumsher died on 12 April 2025, at the age of 78.
