= Inspector general of police (Nepal) =

Highest police rank in Nepal

Inspector general of Nepal police
- प्रहरी महानिरीक्षक
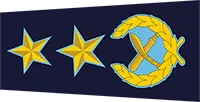
- Incumbent; Manoj KC since 4 November 2026
- Status: Head of Nepal Police
- Abbreviation: IGP
- Reports to: Minister of Home Affairs
- Residence: IGP Residence, Naxal, Kathmandu
- Seat: Nepal Police Headquarters, Naxal, Kathmandu, Nepal
- Appointer: Subject to the decision of the Council of Ministers of Nepal
- Term length: 4 years; Extendable
- Constituting instrument: Police Act 2012
- Formation: 1951
- First holder: Toran Shumsher JBR
- Deputy: Additional Inspector General of Nepal Police (AIGP)
- Website: www.nepalpolice.gov.np

The Inspector general of police (IGP) is the senior-most and highest ranked police officer of Nepal and the head of the Nepalese Police Force, who oversees all police activities throughout the country and reports directly to the Ministry of Home Affairs and is appointed by the government of Nepal for a tenure of four years, although two IGPs have served for six years.

== List of Nepal's IGPs ==
Order	Name	Time in office
1st	Toran Shumsher J.B.R.	March 1951
2nd	Nara Shumsher J.B.R.	March 1951 – December 1953
3rd	Gyan Bahadur Yakthumba	December 1953 – August 1955
4th	Gopal Shumsher J.B.R.	August 1955 – July 1956
5th	Purna Singh Khawas	July 1956 – August 1957
6th	Dhundi Raj Sharma	August 1957 – December 1961
7th	Pahal Singh Lama	December 1961 – July 1966
8th	Rom Bahadur Thapa	August 1966 – June 1972
9th	Khadgajeet Baral	July 1972 – July 1978
10th	Durlav Kumar Thapa	July 1978 – June 1982
11th	Dil Bahadur Lama	June 1982 – June 1986
12th	Hem Bahadur Singh	June 1986 – June 1990
13th	Ratna Shumsher J.B.R.	June 1990 – February 1992
14th	Moti Lal Bohara	February 1992 – January 1996
15th	Dhruba Bahadur Pradhan	March 1996 – December 1996
16th	Achyut Krishna Kharel	February 1996 – March 1996
		December 1996 – September 1999
17th	Pradip Shumsher J.B.R.	September 1999 – December 2002
18th	Shyam Bhakta Thapa	December 2002 – September 2006
19th	Om Bikram Rana	September 2006 – September 2008
20th	Hem Bahadur Gurung	September 2008 – February 2009
21st	Ramesh Chand Thakuri	February 2009 – May 2011
22nd	Rabindra Pratap Shah	June 2011 – September 2012
23rd	Kuber Singh Rana	September 2012 – November 2013
24th	Upendra Kant Aryal	November 2013 – February 2017
25th	Prakash Aryal	10 April 2017 – 11 April 2018
26th	Sarbendra Khanal	11 April 2018 – 11 February 2020
27th	Thakur Prasad Gyawaly	12 February 2020 – 7 July 2020
28th	Shailesh Thapa Chhetri	9 July 2020 – 1 May 2022
29th	Dhiraj Pratap Singh	1 May 2022 – 24 March 2023
30th	Basanta Bahadur Kunwar	24 March 2023 – 18 March 2025
31st	Deepak Thapa	18 March 2025 – 03 September 2025
32nd	Chandra Kuber Khapung	04 September 2025 – 12 November 2025
33rd	Dan Bahadur Karki	13 November 2025 – 4 November 2026
34th	Manoj KC	4 November 2026 – Incumbent
