= Baughagumba =

Boughagumba बौघा गुम्बा
- Village development committee
- Location in Nepal
- Coordinates: 27.92°N 83.52°E
- Country: Nepal
- Zone: Lumbini Zone
- District: Palpa District

Population (1991)
  - Total: 2,811
- Time zone: UTC+5:45 (Nepal Time)

Boughagumba is a village development committee in Palpa District in the Lumbini Zone of southern Nepal. At the time of the 1991 Nepal census it had a population of 2811 people living in 499 individual households.

== Turistic Attractions ==
- Babu Adventure - Parasailing
- Siddha Baba Temple
- The Cliff Pvt. Ltd - Bungee Jumping
