= Central Investigation Bureau =

Nepali national police agency

Central Investigation Bureau केन्द्रिय अनुसन्धान ब्युरो
- Seal of CIB
- Abbreviation: CIB
- Motto: विश्वसनियता, निष्पक्षता र साहस; Credibility, Impartiality, Bravery

Agency overview
- Formed: 1989

Jurisdictional structure
- Operations jurisdiction: Nepal
- Governing body: Ministry of Home Affairs

Operational structure
- Headquarters: Maharajganj, Kathmandu
- Agency executive: Uma Prasad Chaturbedi, Chief of the CIB
- Parent agency: Nepal Police

Website
- cib.nepalpolice.gov.np

The Central Investigation Bureau (CIB; Nepali: केन्द्रिय अनुसन्धान ब्युरो, romanized: Kēndriya anusandhāna byurō) is the national investigation agency of Nepal which is run under Nepal Police. It is sometimes referred as Central Investigation Bureau of Nepal Police. The Central Investigation Bureau (CIB) of Nepal Police aims to sweep away organised crime from the country within a few years. It runs under Nepal Government. the current CIB chief is Manoj KC.

== See also ==
- Crime in Nepal
- Directorate of Military Intelligence, Nepal
- National Investigation Department of Nepal
