= Toran Shumsher Jung Bahadur Rana =

1st Inspector General of Nepal Police

I.G.P. Toran Shumsher Jung Bahadur Rana
- तोरन शमशेर ज.ब.रा.

Commander-in-Chief of Nepal Army
- In office 10 May 1956 – 10 May 1960
- Preceded by: Kiran Shamsher Jang Bahadur Rana
- Succeeded by: Nir Shamsher Jang Bahadur Rana

1st Inspector General of Nepal Police
- In office March 1951 – March 1951
- Monarch: King Tribhuvan Shah
- Prime Minister: Mohan Shumsher J.B.R.
- Succeeded by: Nara Shumsher J.B.R.

Personal details
- Born: 1904 Hattisar Durbar/ Putali Durbar
- Citizenship: Nepalese
- Occupation: Police Officer, Military Officer

Military service
- Rank: General

Toran Shumsher Jung Bahadur Rana was the first police chief of Nepal Police after the establishment of the force in the year 2007 B.S. (1951 A.D.) However, he only remained chief for three days before Nara Shumsher J.B.R. succeeded him as the police chief.

He also served as the Royal Nepalese Army's Commander-in-Chief from 1956–1960.

He was later succeeded by Gen Nir Shumsher Jung Bahadur Rana who later became field marshal.

== Biography ==
Toran Shumsher Jung Bahadur Rana was born in 1904 A.D. at the Hattisar Durbar, son of Commanding Colonel Indra Shumsher Jung Bahadur Rana and Grandson of the late H.H Bir Shumsher Jang Bahadur Rana, the 11th Prime Minister of Nepal.
