= Directorate of Military Intelligence (Nepal) =

The Directorate of Military Intelligence in Nepal is the Nepalese Army’s intelligence unit. With the head office at Military Headquarters in Kathmandu, DMI functions under a Major General of the army. DMI collects its intelligence from plainclothes military agents spread all over the country. During the Maoist insurgency period, DMI was focused on internal security than external activities. On the basis of the intelligence provided by DMI, Director of Military Operation (DMO) analyzes the information and prepares accordingly.
