= Nepal Police =

National Police Force of Nepal

Nepal Police नेपाल प्रहरी
- Emblem of the Nepal Police
- Motto: Truth, Service & Security सत्यं सेवा सुरक्षणम् (main motto)

Agency overview
- Formed: 1955 (2012 B.S.)
- Employees: 79,541
- Annual budget: $423 m USD (2026/27)

Jurisdictional structure
- National agency (Operations jurisdiction): Nepal
- Operations jurisdiction: Nepal
- Legal jurisdiction: Nepal
- Primary governing body: Government of Nepal
- Secondary governing body: Ministry of Home Affairs
- Constituting instrument: Police Act 2012

Operational structure
- Headquarters: Naxal, Kathmandu
- Agency executive: Manoj KC, Inspector General of Police (IGP)
- Child agencies: National Police Academy; Nepal Police Club; Nepal Police Health Club; Aasara Drug Rehabilitation Center; Nepal Police Band
- Bureaus: 4: -Narcotics Control Bureau (NCB); -Central Investigation Bureau (CIB); -Anti Human Trafficking Bureau (AHTB); -Cyber Bureau
- Departments: 5: -Human Resource Development Department; -Province Coordination Department; -Administration Department; -Operation Department; -Crime Investigation Department

Notables
- Anniversary: Nepal Police Day- 23rd of Asoj

Website
- www.nepalpolice.gov.np

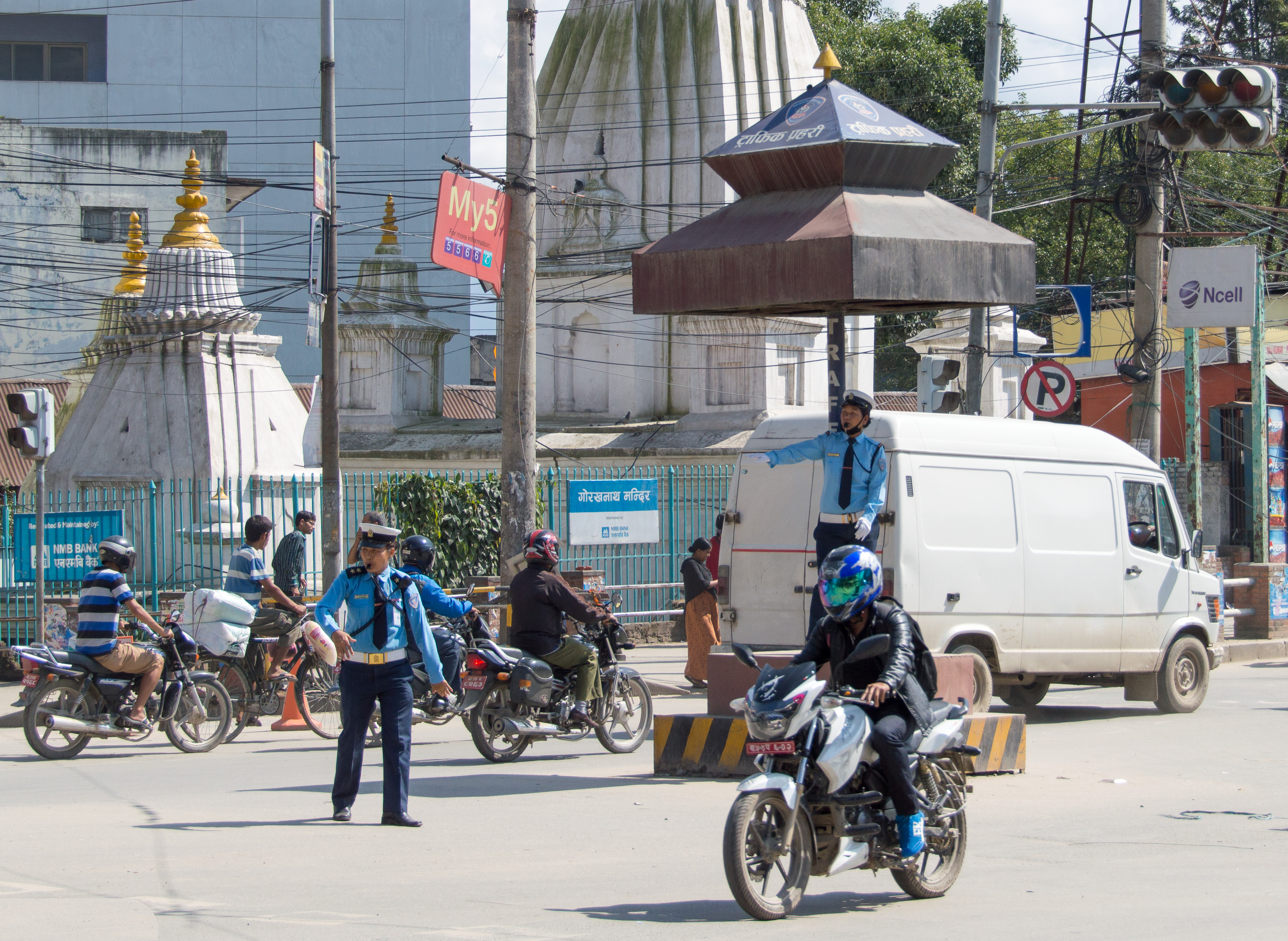
Traffic police in Kathmandu is challenging for the officers due to high pollution in the city

Nepal Police (Nepali: नेपाल प्रहरी, romanized: Nēpāl praharī) is the national and primary national law enforcement agency of Nepal, operating under the Ministry of Home Affairs. It is primarily responsible for maintaining law and order, prevention of crime and crime investigation within the jurisdiction determined by the Constitution of Nepal. Apart from its primary role, Nepal Police conducts a vast array of duties such as VIP protection, Security of Vital Installations, Traffic management, Secret services, Intelligence collection, Riot Control, Disaster management, Hostage rescue and various other Ceremonial roles.

== History ==
=== Before the Rana Regime (1864–1951 AD) ===
During the Rana Regime, little was done to institutionalize policing, establishing Milisiya, Thana police Chakki, office of police director general etc. which gradually shaped the Nepal Police into this modern "Nepal Police".

=== During the period 1951–1990 ===
Nepal saw the dawn of democracy after the fall of the Rana regime. The Police Headquarters was established in 1952 in Kathmandu. Mr. Toran Shamsher J.B. Rana was appointed the first Inspector General of Police. The Police Act, 2012 BS (1955 AD) came into effect. The Police Regulation, 2015 BS (1959 AD) came into effect.

The Parliamentary Government under the multi-party system was adopted for some years which was followed by Panchayat System since 1960. The establishment of the Central Police Training Centre in 1963 A.D.

=== 1990–present ===
The people's democratic movement of 1990 reinstated the multi-party democratic system. The new constitution of the kingdom was promulgated on 9 November 1991. The Police Reform Commission was constituted in the year 1992 and the modernisation of the police started to come in tune with the aspirations of the people and norms of a multi-party system. The first contingent of police personnel was deployed on a UN mission in 1991. More than 2000 police personnel have already served the international community in blue helmets.

== Head of Nepal Police ==
The Nepalese Police is headed by the Inspector General of Police of Nepal. They report directly to the Ministry of Home Affairs and is appointed by the Government of Nepal for a tenure of four years, although two IGPs have served for six years.

The current IGP is Manoj KC since 4 November 2026.

== Organizational structure ==
Nepal Police is structured into various branches and specialized units to address the country's diverse security, investigative, and administrative needs. There are four Bureaus and five Departments in the Police Headquarters that function to undertake the policing activities of Nepal Police. These branches are designed to uphold public safety, enforce laws, and respond effectively to emerging threats across both urban and rural areas.

The Nepal Police has total of 79,554 police personnel, and has 2,344 permanent and 507 temporary police offices and units spread all over the country.

== Core Operational Branches ==
=== Metropolitan Traffic Police Division ===
- Kathmandu Valley traffic Police Office

=== Metropolitan Police Range ===
- Kathmandu Valley Police Office

=== Provincial Police Offices (PPOs) ===
- Koshi Province Police Office
- Madhesh Province Police Office
- Bagmati Province Police Office
- Gandaki Province Police Office
- Lumbini province Police Office
- Karnali Province Police Office
- Sudurpaschim Province Police Office

== Departments ==
=== 5. Crime Investigation Department ===
- Central Polygraph Section

Nepal Police use polygraph systems for credibility assessment in criminal and internal disciplinary investigations.

== Types of Nepal Police Personnel ==
=== 1. General Duty Police ===
- District Police Offices (DPOs) – Local law enforcement in all 77 districts
- Metropolitan Police Ranges – Urban policing in Kathmandu, Lalitpur, Bhaktapur, Pokhara, etc.
- Provincial Police Offices (1–7) – Command centers aligned with Nepal’s federal structure
- Border Police Units – Monitor and secure international borders
- Tourist Police

=== 2. Investigative Police ===
- Crime Investigation Department (CID)
- Central Investigation Bureau (CIB)
- Cyber Bureau
- Human Trafficking Control Bureau
- Women and Children Service Directorate

=== 3. Traffic Police ===
- Kathmandu Valley Traffic Police Office
- Regional Traffic Units – Operate in major cities and highways
- Mobile Traffic Patrols – Equipped with GPS and surveillance tool

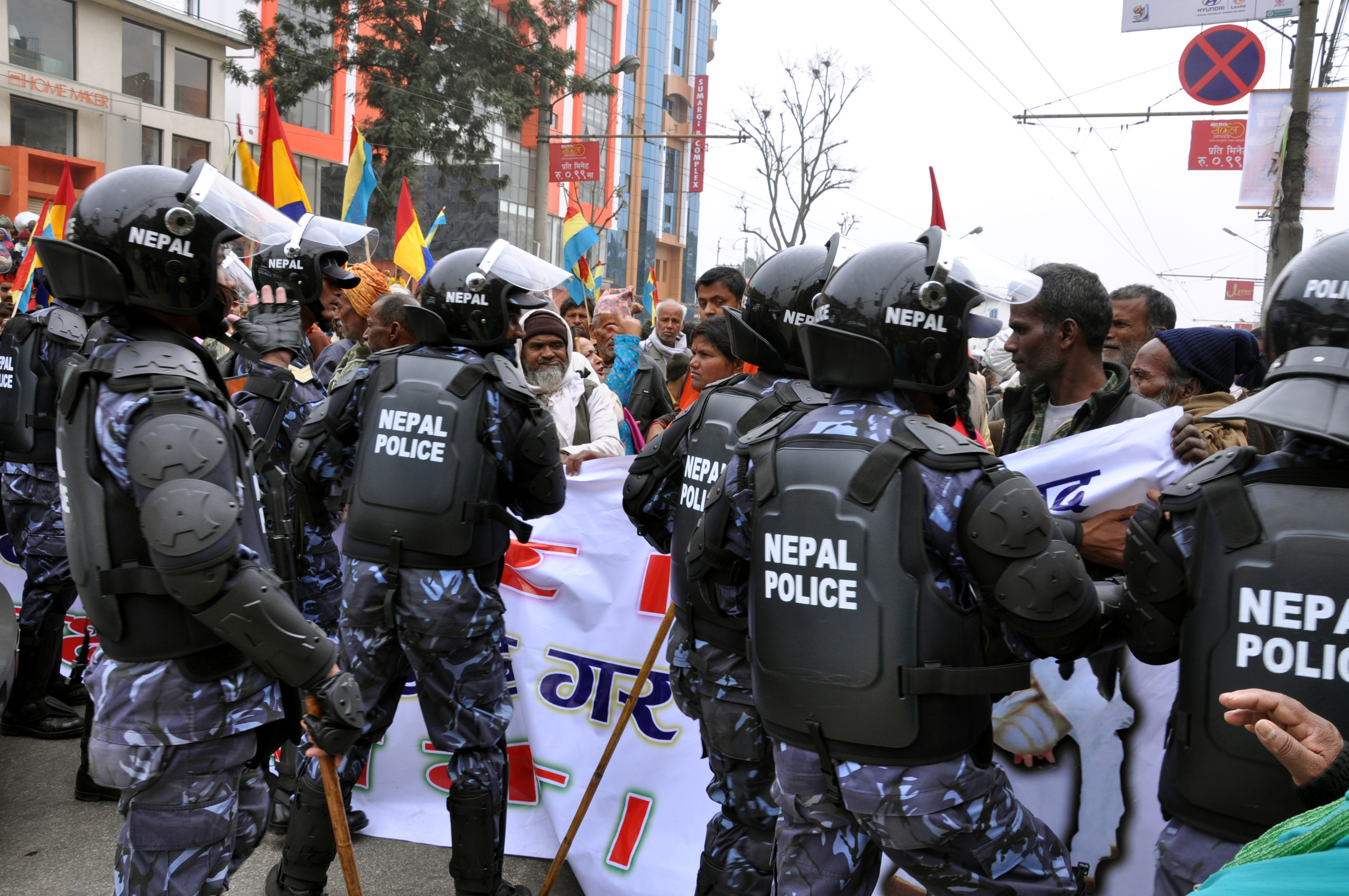
Riot police during Jana andolan

=== 4. Tactical Units and Special Forces ===
- Special Task Force (STF)
- Riot Control Units
- VIP Security Division
- Anti-Terrorism Task Force

=== 5. Technical Police ===
- Forensic Science Laboratory
- Communication Directorate
- Training Directorate
- Logistics and Welfare Directorate
- Medical and Engineering Units

=== 6. Training and Academic Units ===
- National Police Academy
- Regional Training Centers
- Specialized Skill Schools – Cybercrime, disaster response, negotiation

=== 7. Ceremonial and Community Police ===
Engaged in public outreach, cultural representation, and ceremonial duties.

- Nepal Police Band
- Community Police Units – Promote citizen engagement and safety awareness
- Aasara Drug Rehabilitation Center – Social reintegration programs

== List of Additional Inspector General of Police (AIGPs) ==
These departments are headed either by Additional Inspector General of Police (AIGP) or Deputy Inspector General of Police (DIGP). In addition to the departments, there are the National Police Academy and the Metropolitan Police Office that are being looked by Additional Inspector General of Police.

As of 24 September 2025

AIGP Name	Department/ Bureau	Function
Uma Prassad Chaturvedi	Operations Department	Coordinates field operations, riot control, and tactical deployments
Sushil Singh Rathore	Crime Investigation Department	Oversees criminal investigations nationwide
Rajan Adhikari	Human Resource Department	Manages personnel, recruitment, and administrative affairs
Himalayan Kumar Shrestha	Administration Department	Leads traffic regulation and enforcement across Nepal
Dambar Bahadur BK	Province Coordination Department	Leads traffic regulation and enforcement across Nepal
Siddhi Bikram Shah	National Police Academy	Responsible for strategic leadership training and curriculum development
Ishwor Karki	Kathmandu Valley Police	Maintains law and order in Kathmandu Valley
Manoj Kumar KC	Central Investigation Bureau	Focuses on high-profile and organized crime investigations
Purposed	Narcotics Control Bureau	Handles drug-related crimes and international coordination
Purposed	Tribhuvan Int'l Airport Security	Airport perimeter and terminal security and safety

=== Nepal Police Hospital ===
Nepal Police Hospital was inaugurated by the late king Birendra Bir Bikram Shah Dev on the 27th of Chaitra, 2040 BS. It was established to provide free health services to in-service policemen, their families, and ex-servicemen and their spouses. The hospital commenced OPD services and 25 bedded indoor services through 5 medical doctors, a few nurses, paramedics and administrative staff. The infrastructure then was built with the financial support of the Government of Nepal and the voluntary contribution of the police personnel. Some instruments and equipment were donated by the Government of India and a Japanese club.

=== National Police Academy ===
Head: AIGP

The National Police Academy of Nepal, formerly known as the Sadar Prahari Talim Kendra, is an academic wing of the Nepal Police. It is solely responsible for conducting basic and advanced training programs for the police officers in Nepal. The NPA is the apex body of all Nepal Police Training Institutions in the country.

=== Research and Planning Directorate ===
Research and Planning (R&P)Directorate of Nepal Police was established in 1987 as the research and planning division. Now, the R&P Directorate is responsible for conducting research on the issues of institutional development and service delivery and making the plans based on the findings of the research. The directorate is responsible for conducting research and formulating plans based on the research.

Altogether 17 Research and planning sections have been established at departmental and regional levels under the R&P Directorate to build a quick network to facilitate research and planning activities of Nepal police.

== Uniform ==
The uniform of the Nepal Police consists of both summer and winter gear.

Regular officers wear a light blue shirt with navy blue pants. Junior ranks wear beret while high-ranked officers wear Peaked cap (with a blue band) with most senior officers with braids on the peak.

Riot police (Special Task Force Police) wear blue DPM pattern camouflage uniforms will ball caps. The winter uniform adds a blue jacket or sweater.

== Rank insignia ==
The Nepal Police has fourteen ranks. Three new ranks, Senior Sub Inspector (SSI), Senior Head Constable (SHC), and Assistant Head Constable (AHC), were recently added to the Nepal Police.

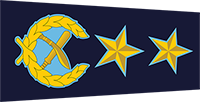
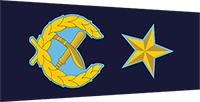
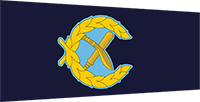
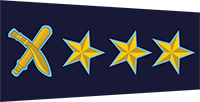
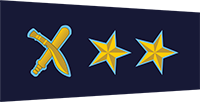
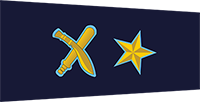
प्रहरी महानिरीक्षक Prahārī Mahānirīkr̥ṣak	प्रहरी अतिरिक्त महानिरीक्षक Prahārī Atirikt Mahānirīkr̥ṣak	प्रहरी नायव महानिरीक्षक Prahārī Nāyava Mahānirīkr̥ṣak	प्रहरी वरिष्ठ उपरीक्षक Prahārī Varishṭ Uparīkṣak	प्रहरी उपरीक्षक Prahārī Uparīkṣak	प्रहरी नायव उपरीक्षक Prahārī Nāyava Uparīkṣak	प्रहरी निरीक्षक Prahārī Nirīkṣak
Two-star pips, crossed Khukuri and police baton within a wreath of Lotus leaves	One-star pip, crossed Khukuri and police baton within a wreath of Lotus leaves	Crossed Khukuri and police baton within a wreath of Lotus leaves	Three stars pips with crossed Khukuri and police baton	Two stars pips with crossed Khukuri and police baton	One-star pip, crossed Khukuri and police baton	Crossed Khukuri and police baton
Inspector General (IGP)	Additional Inspector General (AIG)	Deputy Inspector General (DIG)	Senior Superintendent (SSP)	Superintendent (SP)	Deputy Superintendent (DSP)	Inspector (INSP)

प्रहरी वरिष्ठ नायव निरीक्षक Prahārī Varishṭ Nāyava Nirīkṣak	प्रहरी नायव निरीक्षक Prahārī Nāyava Nirīkṣak	प्रहरी सहायक निरीक्षक Prahārī Sahāyak Nirīkṣak	प्रहरी वरिष्ठ हवल्दार Prahārī Varishṭ Havaladār	प्रहरी हवल्दार Prahārī Havaladār	प्रहरी सहायक हवल्दार Prahārī Sahāyak Havaladār	प्रहरी जवान Prahārī Jwān
Three star pips	Two star pips	One star pip	Three chevrons on the shoulder with a yellow shoulder strap	Three chevrons on shoulder	Two chevrons on shoulder	A red and yellow shoulder strap
Senior Sub Inspector (SSI)	Sub Inspector (SI)	Assistant Sub Inspector (ASI)	Police Senior Head Constable (SHC)	Police Head Constable (HC)	Police Assistant Head Constable (AHC)	Police Constable (PC)

== Weapons and Equipments ==
Name	Weapon	Type	Caliber	Origin	Note
Handguns
Beretta 92		Semi-automatic pistol	9×19mm Parabellum	Italy	
Glock 17		Semi-automatic pistol	9×19mm Parabellum	Austria	
Pistol Auto 9mm 1A		Semi-automatic pistol	9×19mm Parabellum	India	
Shotgun
Remington Model 870		Pump action	12-gauge shotgun	USA	
Submachine gun
Heckler & Koch MP5		Submachine gun	9×19mm Parabellum	Germany	
IWI Uzi		Submachine gun	.260 Remington	Israel	Deployed in airport security and tactical squads
Sterling submachine gun		Submachine gun	9×19mm Parabellum	United Kingdom	
Assault Rifle/ Battle Rifles
IMI Galil		Assault rifle	5.56×45mm NATO	Israel	
Colt Commando		Carbine	5.56×45mm NATO	United States	
INSAS rifle		Light machine gun	5.56×45mm NATO	India	
M16		Assault rifle	5.56×45mm NATO	United States	
L1A1 Self-Loading Rifle		Battle Rifle	7.62x51mm NATO	United Kingdom	Uses by special units
Light Machine Gun
FN MAG		GPMG	7.62x51mm NATO	Belgium	Used by garrison and perimeter defense units
Sniper Rifles
Dragunov SVD		Sniper rifle	7.62×54mmR	Soviet Union	Limited use in special operations

== See also ==
- Armed Police Force
- Nepal Police Club
- National Investigation Department of Nepal
