= Chhetri =

Ethnic group in Nepal and India

Chhetri/Kshetri/Khasiya/Khas
क्षेत्री/खश/खश्या
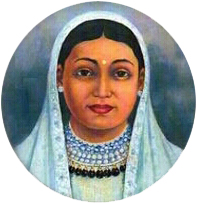
- Portrait of Queen Tripurasundari of Nepal, a Chhetri who ruled the country as a queen regent from 1806 to 1832

Regions with significant populations
- Nepal: 4,796,995 (16.4% of Nepal's population) (2021)

Languages
- Eastern Pahari languages

Religion
- Hinduism 99.25% (2011), Christianity 0.6% (2011)

Related ethnic groups
- Khas peoples Thakuri, Kumaoni, Magar, and other Indo-Aryan peoples

Chhetri (Kshetri, Kshettri, Kshetry or Chhettri), (Nepali: क्षेत्री pronounced [tsʰetri]; IAST: Kṣetrī) historically called Kshettriya or Kshetriya or Khas are Nepali-speaking people historically associated with the warrior class and administration, some of whom trace their origin to migration from medieval India. Chhetri was a caste of administrators, governors, warriors and military elites in the medieval Khas Kingdom and Gorkha Kingdom (later unified Kingdom of Nepal). The nobility of the Gorkha Kingdom mainly originated from Chhetri families. They also had a strong presence in civil administration affairs. The bulk of prime ministers of Nepal before the democratization of Nepal belonged to this caste as a result of the old Gorkhali aristocracy. Gorkha-based aristocratic Chhetri families included the Pande dynasty, the Basnyat dynasty, the Kunwar family (and their offspring branch, the autocratic Rana dynasty) and the Thapa dynasty. From 1806 to 1951, Chhetri prime ministers wielded absolute rule in the country and the monarchy was reduced to a powerless figurehead.

Khas Chhetris were traditionally considered a division of the Khas people with Khas Brahmin (commonly called Khas Bahun). They make up 16.45% of Nepal's population according to the 2021 Nepal census, making them the most populous caste or ethnic community in Nepal. Chhetris speak an Indo-Aryan Nepali language (Khas-Kura) as mother tongue.

== Etymology and background ==
Chhetri is considered a direct derivative of the Sanskrit word Kshatriya from the root kṣatra meaning "rule or authority" which was associated with the ruling and warrior class of Hindu society. According to the 1854 Legal Code (Muluki Ain) of Nepal, Chhetris were a social group among the sacred thread bearers (Tagadhari) and twice-born people of the Hindu tradition. Almost all Chhetris are Hindu.

The term 'Chhetri' was adopted by a lot of the high-ranking Khas after the unification of Nepal, and it was formalized by an order of Bir Narsingh Kunwar (Jang Bahadur Rana), who considered their original name (Khasa) to be derogatory.

== The family occupation of Chhetris ==
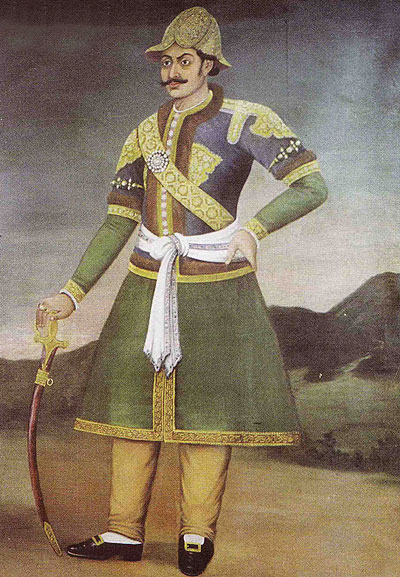
Bhimsen Thapa, Prime Minister and de-facto autocratic ruler of Nepal from 1806 to 1837.

The caste system of Nepal was decided according to the occupation they did from the ancestors of their family, known as Dharma (Devanagari: धर्म). The family occupation of Brahmin was guru or the spiritual leader in Hinduism whereas that of Chhetri was military and political leaders. Hence, the majority of military and political positions have been historically occupied by Chhetris until now. (Note: The Gorkha soldiers are usually from Gurung community in Gorkha district of Nepal.)

== History ==
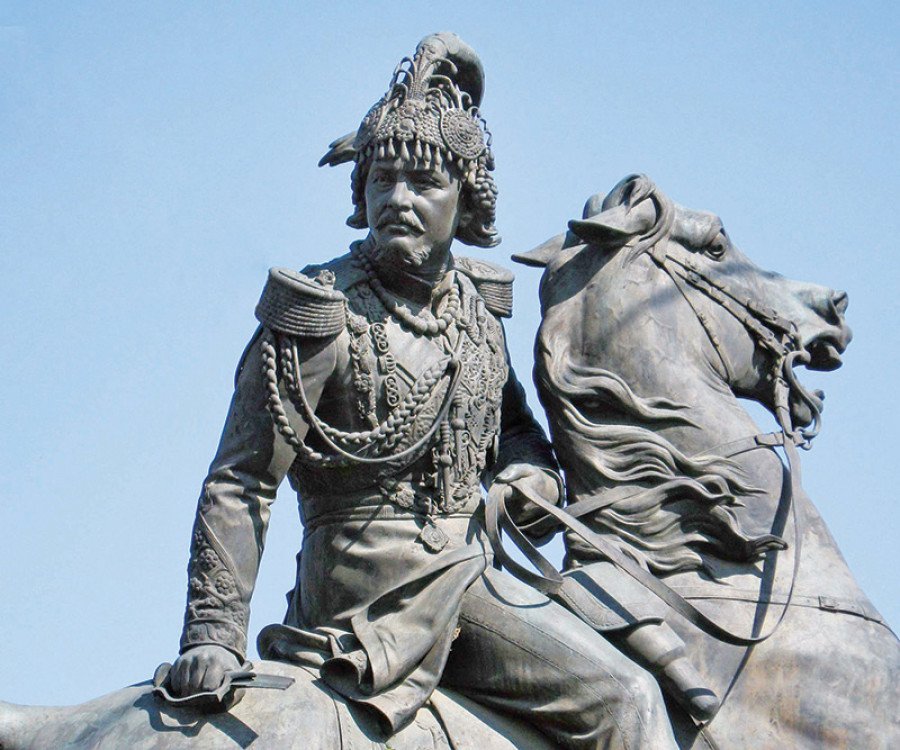
Jang Bahadur Rana, Premier and de-facto autocratic ruler of Nepal; also a patriarch of historical Rana dynasty (1846-1951).

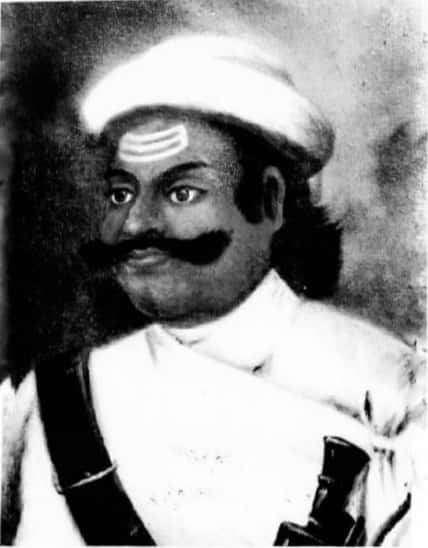
Portrait of Prime Minister Kalu Pande wearing Khukuri, a Pande Chhetri aristocrat; Kaji (Prime Minister and Army Chief) of Gorkha Kingdom.

They are thought to be connected to the Khasas mentioned in the ancient Indian literature and the medieval Khasa kingdom. In the early modern history of Nepal, Chhetris played a key role in the Unification of Nepal, providing the core of the Gorkhali army of the mid-18th century. Bir Bhadra Thapa was a Thapa of Chhetri group and leading Bharadar during Unification of Nepal. His grandson Bhimsen Thapa became Mukhtiyar (Prime Minister) of Nepal. Swarup Singh Karki, a leading politician and military officer, belonged to Chhetri family. Abhiman Singh Basnyat of Basnyat dynasty, Damodar Pande of Pande dynasty were both members of Chhetri caste, and Jung Bahadur Rana, founder of Rana dynasty also belonged to the Chhetri community.

For 104 years since the middle of the 19th century until 1951, hereditary Rana prime ministers wielded absolute rule in the country relegating the monarchy to a mere figurehead. During the monarchy, Chhetris continued to dominate the ranks of the Nepalese government, Nepalese Army, Nepalese Police and administration.

=== Chhetri noble families ===
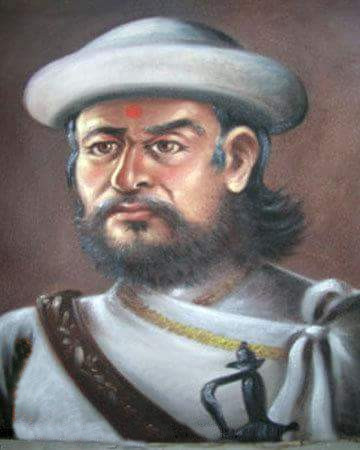
Prime Minister Abhiman Singh Basnyat, a Basnyat Kshetri Mulkaji.

Most of the political leadership of the Gorkha Kingdom (and later, Kingdom of Nepal) hailed from Chhetri families; primarily from the families of Basnyats, Baniyas, Kunwars, Khatris, Pandes, and Thapas who formed the nobility known as Kazis and Sardars. The political and administrative dominance of Chhetris in the kingdom of Nepal continued with the dynastic rule of the Rana Prime Ministers (1846–1953), the Pande family, the Thapa family, and the Basnyat family, all of whom held the most prominent positions in the country and overwhelmingly monopolized the Chhetri presence in the Government of Nepal, its military and police. In traditional and administrative professions, Chhetris were given favorable treatment by the royal government.

=== Chhetri and premiership ===
The nobility of Gorkha were mainly from Chhetri families and they had strong presence in civil administration affairs. All of the Prime Minister of Nepal between 1768 and 1950 were Chhetris with the exception of Ranga Nath Poudyal, being a Bahun, and Fateh Jung Shah, being a Thakuri. These number varied after the democratization of Nepal. Between 1951 and 1997, out of the 16 Prime Ministers of Nepal, 5 of them were Chhetris.

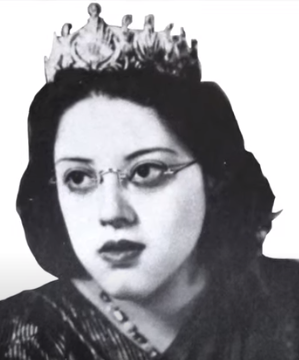
Late Queen Indra Rajya Lakshmi Devi of Nepal, mother of King Birendra and King Gyanendra, was from Rana Chhetri dynasty.

Chhetri Premiers of Nepal
| S.N. | Name | Took office | Left office | Notes |
|---|---|---|---|---|
| 1 | Vamsharaj Pande | 1776 | 1779 | again from 1782-1785 |
| 2 | Swarup Singh Karki | 1776 | 1777 | |
| 3 | Abhiman Singh Basnyat | 1785 | 1794 | |
| 4 | Kirtiman Singh Basnyat | 1794 | 1801 | |
| 5 | Bakhtawar Singh Basnyat | 1801 | 1803 | |
| 6 | Damodar Pande | 1803 | 1803 | |
| 7 | Bhimsen Thapa | 1806 | 1837 | |
| 8 | Rana Jang Pande | 1837 | 1837 | again from 1839-1840 |
| 9 | Mathabar Singh Thapa | 1843 | 1845 | |
| 10 | Jung Bahadur Rana | 1846 | 1856 | again from 1857-1877 |
| 11 | Bam Bahadur Kunwar | 1856 | 1857 | |
| 12 | Krishna Bahadur Kunwar Rana | 1857 | 1857 | |
| 13 | Ranodip Singh Kunwar | 1877 | 1885 | |
| 14 | Bir Shumsher Jung Bahadur Rana | 1885 | 1901 | |
| 15 | Dev Shumsher Jung Bahadur Rana | 1901 | 1901 | |
| 16 | Chandra Shumsher Jung Bahadur Rana | 1901 | 1929 | |
| 17 | Bhim Shumsher Jung Bahadur Rana | 1929 | 1932 | |
| 18 | Juddha Shumsher Jung Bahadur Rana | 1932 | 1945 | |
| 19 | Padma Shumsher Jung Bahadur Rana | 1945 | 1948 | |
| 20 | Mohan Shumsher Jung Bahadur Rana | 1948 | 1951 | |
| 21 | Surya Bahadur Thapa | 1955 | 1955 | again from 1963-1964; 1965-1969, 1979-1983, 1997-1998, 2003-2004 |
| 22 | Subarna Shamsher Rana | 1958 | 1959 | |
| 23 | Kirti Nidhi Bista | 1969 | 1970 | again from 1971-1973; 1977-1979 |
| 24 | Sher Bahadur Deuba | 1995 | 1997 | again from 2001-2002; 2004-2005, 2017-2018, 2021-2022 |
| 25 | Sushila Karki | 2025 | 2026 | First female prime minister of Nepal |

== Military achievements ==
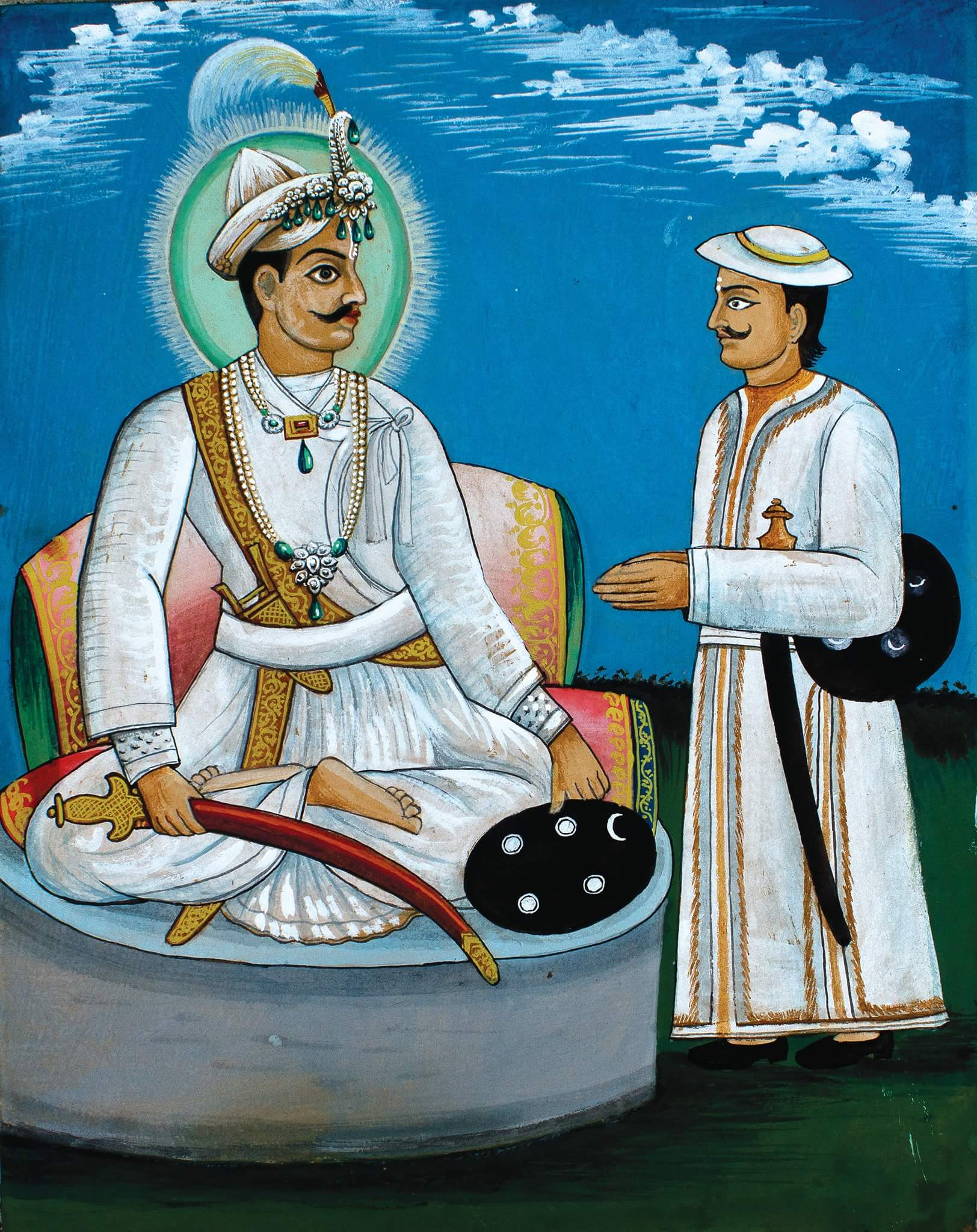
Portrait of King Prithivi Narayan Shah, founder of modern Nepal, consulting with army chief Shivaram Singh Basnyat.

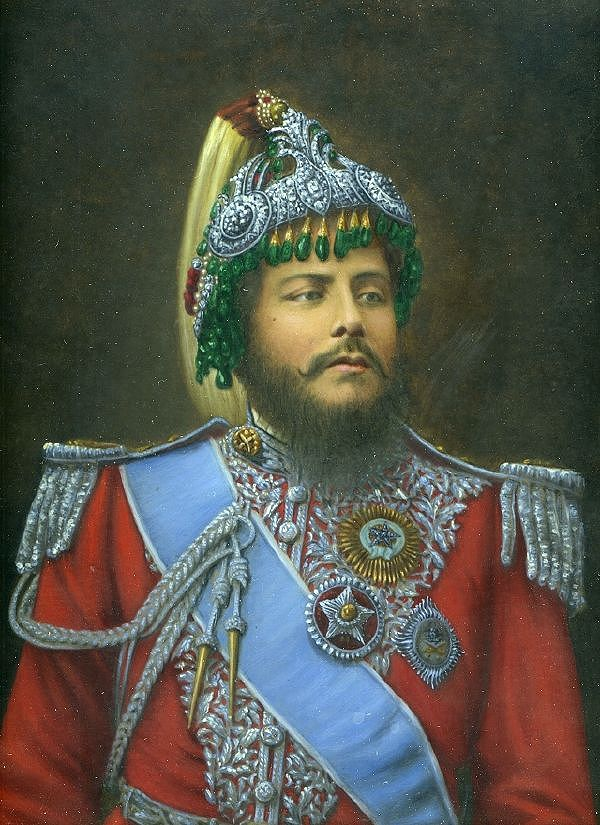
Bir Shamsher JBR, a Rana Kshetri Maharaja and Prime Minister

Chhetri had dominated high military positions and monopolized the military force at the times of Chhetri autocratic administrators like PM Bhimsen Thapa and PM Jung Bahadur Rana. There were 12 Basnyats, 16 Pandes, 6 Thapas and 3 Kunwar officers totalling to 51 Chhetri officers in the year 1841 A.D. The most prominent officers at Shah administration were the Kajis which had control over civil and military functions like a Minister and Military officer combined. Rana Jang Pande, the leader of Pande faction, was the Prime Minister of Nepal in 1841 A.D. which might have caused an increase in the number of Pande officers at 1841. After the rise Rana dynasty (Kunwars), the number changed to 10 Basnyats, 1 Pandes, 3 Thapas and 26 Kunwar officers totaling to 61 Chhetri officers in the year 1854 A.D.Chhetris dominated the position of the senior officers of the Nepali Army comprising 74.4% of total senior officers in 1967. Similarly, Chhetris composed 38.1%, 54.3% and 55.3% of the senior officers in the year 2003, 2004 and 2007 respectively.

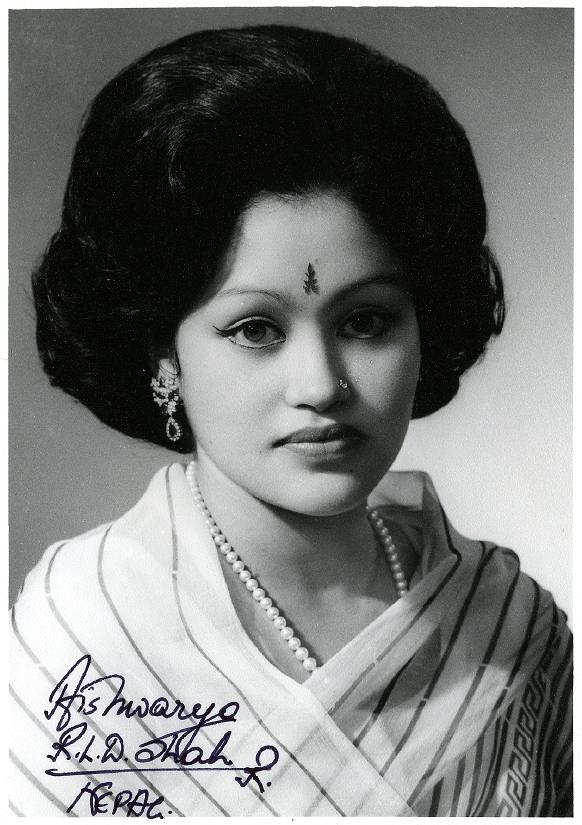
Late Queen Aishwarya of Nepal; a Rana Chhetri

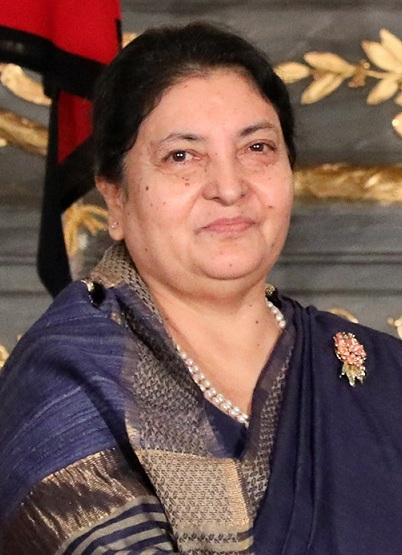
Bidya Devi Bhandari, first woman President of Nepal & Commander-in-Chief was born in a Pandey Chhetri family.

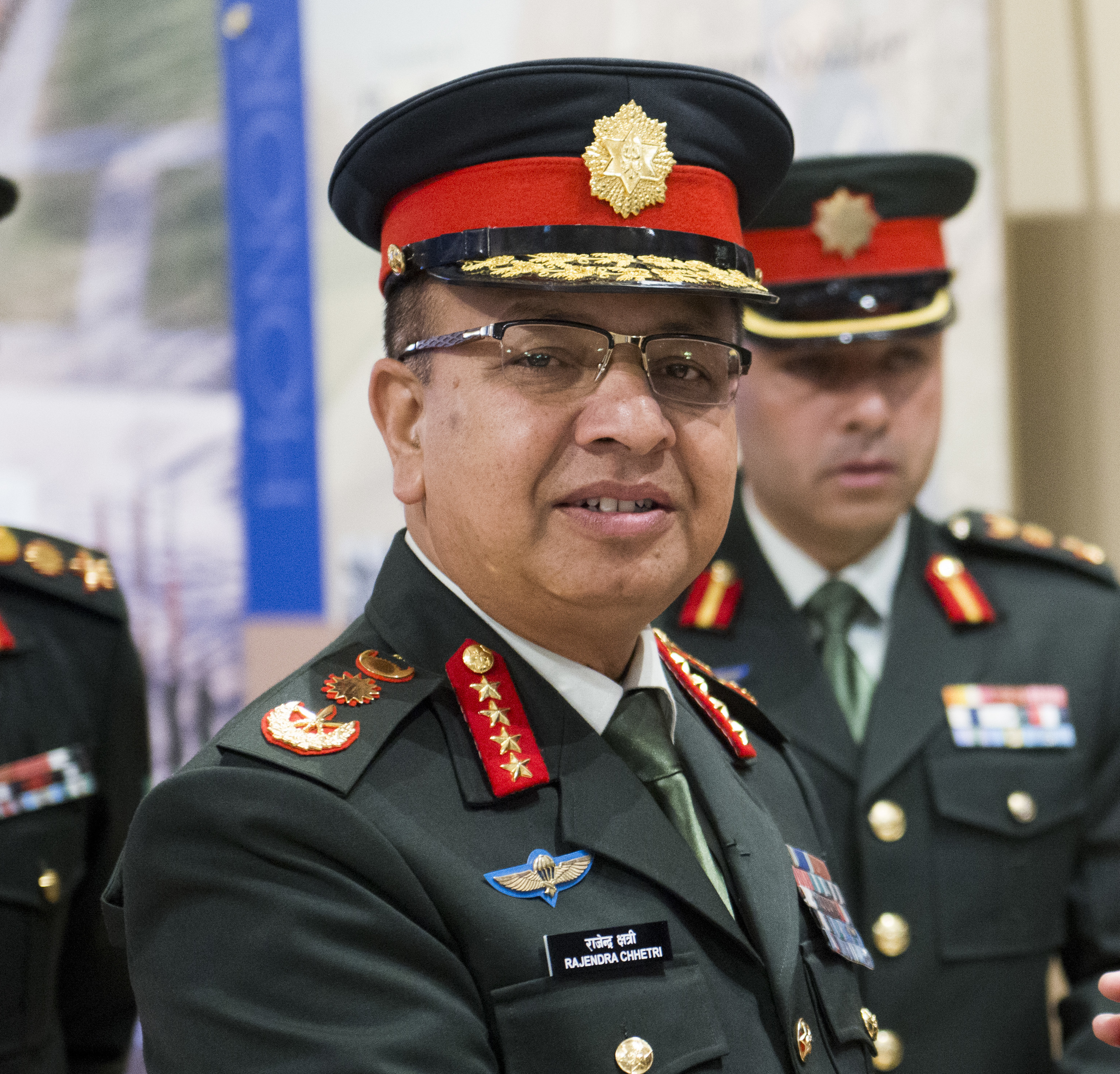
Former Head of Nepalese Army, Rajendra Chhetri (KC)

Chhetri Heads of Nepalese Army (18th to 21st century)
| S.N. | Name | Office |
|---|---|---|
| 1 | Shivaram Singh Basnyat | 1743–1747 |
| 2 | Vamshidhar "Kalu" Pande | 1747–1757 |
| 3 | Vamsharaj Pande | ????–1785 |
| 4 | Abhiman Singh Basnyat | ????–1794 |
| 5 | Damodar Pande | ????–1804 |
| 6 | Bhimsen Thapa | 1811–1837 |
| 7 | Rana Jang Pande | 1837–1837 |
| 8 | Mathabar Singh Thapa | 1843–1845 |
| 9 | Jung Bahadur Rana | 1846–1856 |
| 10 | Bam Bahadur Kunwar | 1856–1857 |
| 11 | Krishna Bahadur Kunwar Rana | 1857–1862 |
| 12 | Ranodip Singh Kunwar | 1862–1877 |
| 13 | Jagat Shumsher Rana | 1877–1879 |
| 14 | Dhir Shumsher Kunwar Rana | 1879–1884 |
| 15 | Jit Jung Rana | 1884–1885 |
| 16 | Khadga Shumsher Jung Bahadur Rana | 1885–1887 |
| 17 | Rana Shumsher Jung Bahadur Rana | 1887–1887 |
| 18 | Dev Shumsher Jung Bahadur Rana | 1887–1901 |
| 19 | Chandra Shumsher Jung Bahadur Rana | 1901–1901 |
| 20 | Bhim Shumsher Jung Bahadur Rana | 1901–1929 |
| 21 | Juddha Shumsher Jung Bahadur Rana | 1929–1932 |
| 22 | Rudra Shumsher Jung Bahadur Rana | 1932–1934 |
| 23 | Padma Shumsher Jung Bahadur Rana | 1934–1945 |
| 24 | Mohan Shumsher Jung Bahadur Rana | 1945–1948 |
| 25 | Baber Shumsher Jung Bahadur Rana | 1948–1951 |
| 26 | Kaiser Shumsher Jung Bahadur Rana | 1951–1953 |
| 27 | Kiran Shumsher Jung Bahadur Rana | 1953–1956 |
| 28 | Toran Shumsher Jung Bahadur Rana | 1956–1960 |
| 29 | Nir Shumsher Jung Bahadur Rana | 1960–1965 |
| 30 | Singha Bahadur Basnyat | 1970–1975 |
| 31 | Guna Shumsher Jung Bahadur Rana | 1975–1979 |
| 32 | Arjun Narsingh Rana | 1983–1987 |
| 33 | Satchit Jung Bahadur Rana | 1987–1991 |
| 34 | Gadul Shamsher Jang Bahadur Rana | 1991–1995 |
| 35 | Dharmapaal Barsingh Thapa | 1995–1999 |
| 36 | Prajwalla Shamsher Jang Bahadur Rana | 1999–2003 |
| 37 | Pyar Jung Thapa | 2003–2006 |
| 38 | Rookmangad Katawal | 2006–2009 |
| 39 | Gaurav Shamsher Jang Bahadur Rana | 2012–2015 |
| 40 | Rajendra Chhetri | 2015–2018 |
| 41 | Purna Chandra Thapa | 2018–2021 |
| 42 | Ashok Raj Sigdel Chhetri | 2024– |

=== Sino-Nepalese, Anglo-Nepalese and Nepal-Tibet wars ===
Chhetri commanders and generals of the military campaigns of the kingdom of Nepal have shaped the political course of the country overwhelmingly. Among the most prominent battles, the wars fought between Nepal and the empires of Tibet, China and the United Kingdom have highlighted the military strength of the kingdom of Nepal at a time of regional disintegration in South Asia. In 1788, Nepal invaded Tibet and as a consequence, a war was fought between Qing dynasty of China and the Kingdom of Nepal from 1788 to 1792, known as the Sino-Nepalese War. The battle, which was commanded by commanders Damodar Pande, Abhiman Singh Basnyat, and Kirtiman Singh Basnyat resulted in a treaty with Tibet accepting terms dictated by Nepal; as a outcome of which Tibet would pay tribute to Nepal and Nepalese citizens would have the right to visit, trade, and establish industries in any part of Tibet and China.

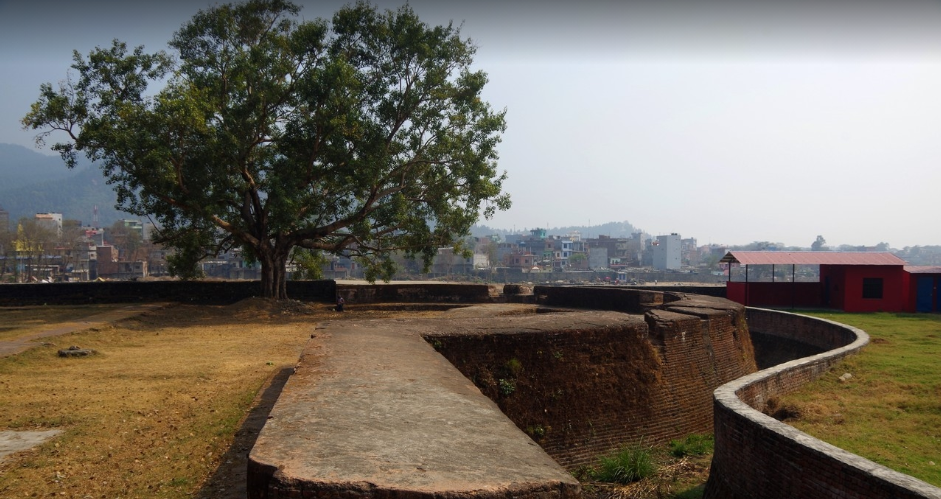
Jit Gadhi fort, site of Nepal's victory against the British army; led by Chhetri Colonel Ujir Singh Thapa during Anglo-Nepalese war

After about two and half decades of the Sino-Nepalese war, with the expansion of the British Empire in India, Anglo-Nepalese War was fought between the British forces and the army of Kingdom of Nepal. The war was commanded by Bhimsen Thapa, Amar Singh Thapa, Ujir Singh Thapa, Ranabir Singh Thapa, Dalbhanjan Pande, Bakhtawar Singh Thapa and Ranajor Singh Thapa from 1814 to 1816 and led to a peace treaty with the British and maintained the independence of Nepal during the British Company rule and British Raj in South Asia from 18th to 20th century.

With the ascent of Rana dynasty, another war broke out between Nepal and Tibet (Nepal–Tibet War of 1855–1856) when Jung Bahadur Rana declared war over Tibet. The battle was commanded by Bam Bahadur Kunwar, Sanak Singh Khatri, Prithvi Dhoj Kunwar, Dhir Sumsher and Krishna Dhoj Kunwar and resulted in the victory of Nepalese troops whereby the Tibetans had to pay an annual subsidy of ten thousand rupees to Nepal and were made to allow the establishment of a Nepalese trading station and agency in Lhasa.

== Religion ==
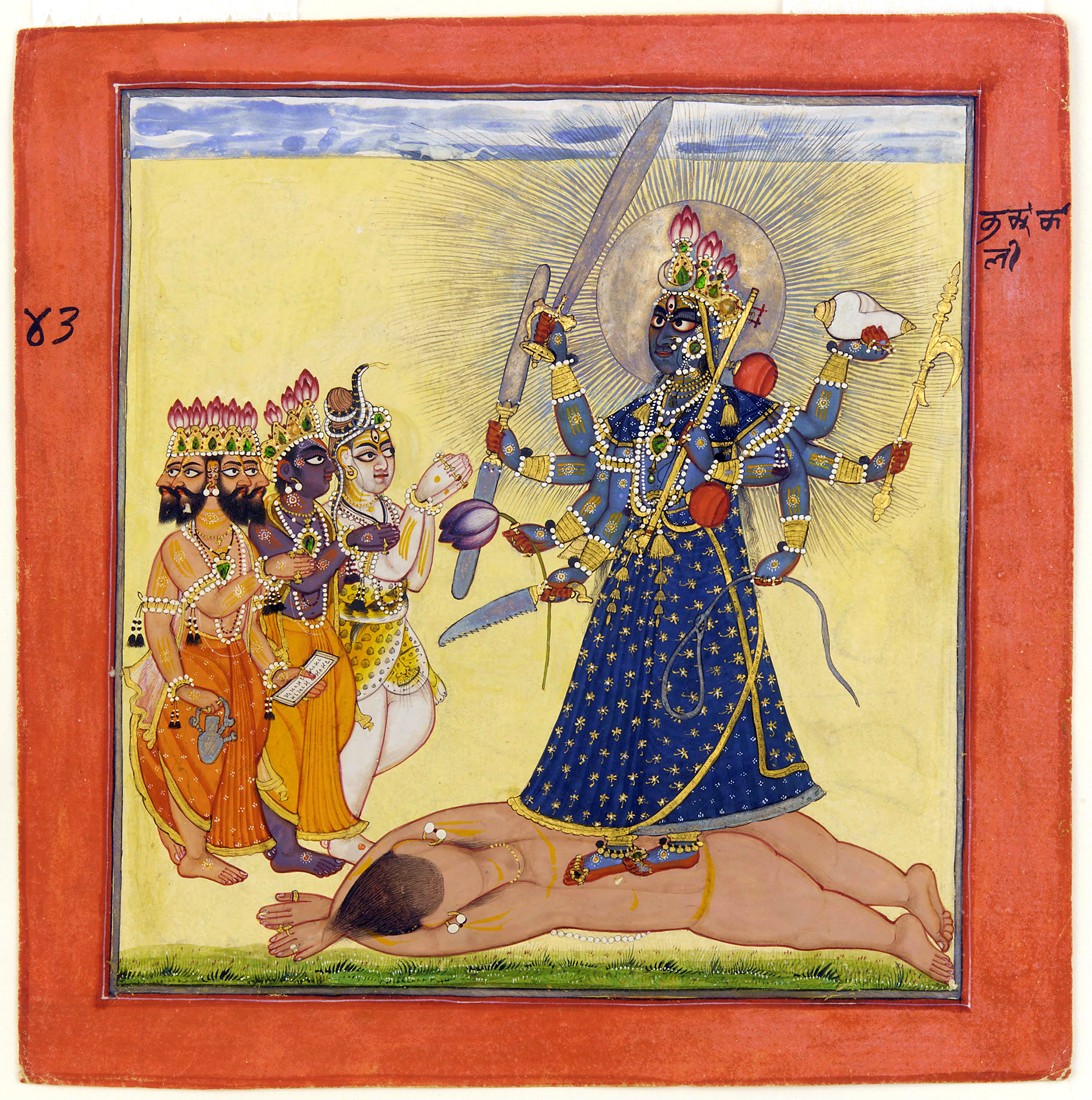
Due to large number of Chhetri commanders, Goddess Bhadrakali became the patron deity of Nepal's army. The war cry "Jay Mahakali, Ayo Gurkhali " meaning "Hail Great Goddess Kali, here come the Gurkhas!" invoked Goddess Kali during wars

Almost all the Chhetris are Hindus, and form the largest Hindu adhering sub-group of Nepal representing 99.3% of their population, and those who are Hindus may also follow Buddhism; the Buddha being worshipped as the ninth avatar of god Vishnu. Chhetris have historically practiced Hindu polytheism which included the worship of Khas Masto sect of Shaivism, clan deity (Kuldevta), their personal favorite deity (Ishta-devata), fierce forms of Shiva (such as Virabhadra and Rudra) and goddesses such as Adi Shakti, Kali and Bhadrakali.

Owing to the extensively large number of Chhetri generals and commander-in-chiefs in the Nepalese Army (formerly known as Gorkha Army), goddess Bhadrakali, an auspicious form of Kali, was the patron deity of the army and her worship was necessary before and during wars. The war cry, "Jay Mahakali, Ayo Gurkhali " meaning "Hail Great Goddess Kali, here come the Gurkhas!", invoked the sense of protection from Goddess Kali during battles and today is the war slogan of the Nepalese Army as well as Gurkha regiment of the Indian Army and the British Army.

== Families and surnames ==
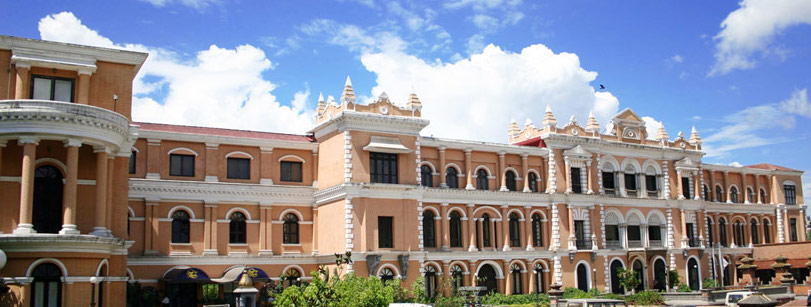
Lal Durbar (Red Palace), associated with Rana Chhetris of Kathmandu

Surnames of Chhetris include, among others:

- Adhikari/Raya, Thami, Khulal, Khapatari and Thada
- Baniya
- Basnet
- Bisht
- Bhandari/(Raghubansi)
- Bohra
- Burathoki
- Chauhan
- Gharti
- Karki
- Khadka
- Khatri
- Khulal
- Kunwar
- Mahara
- Negi
- Pande/पाँडे/पाडे (not to be mistaken with Brahmin Pandeya)
- Rana
- Raut
- Rawal
- Rawat
- Rayamajhi
- Rokka
- Thapa

== Demographics ==
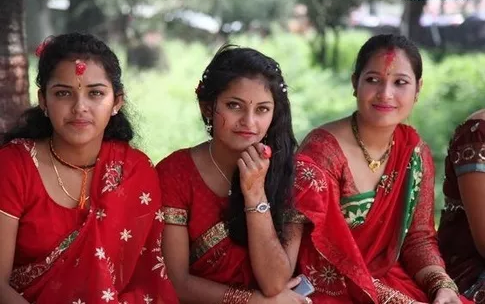
Women from Chhetri community during religious festival

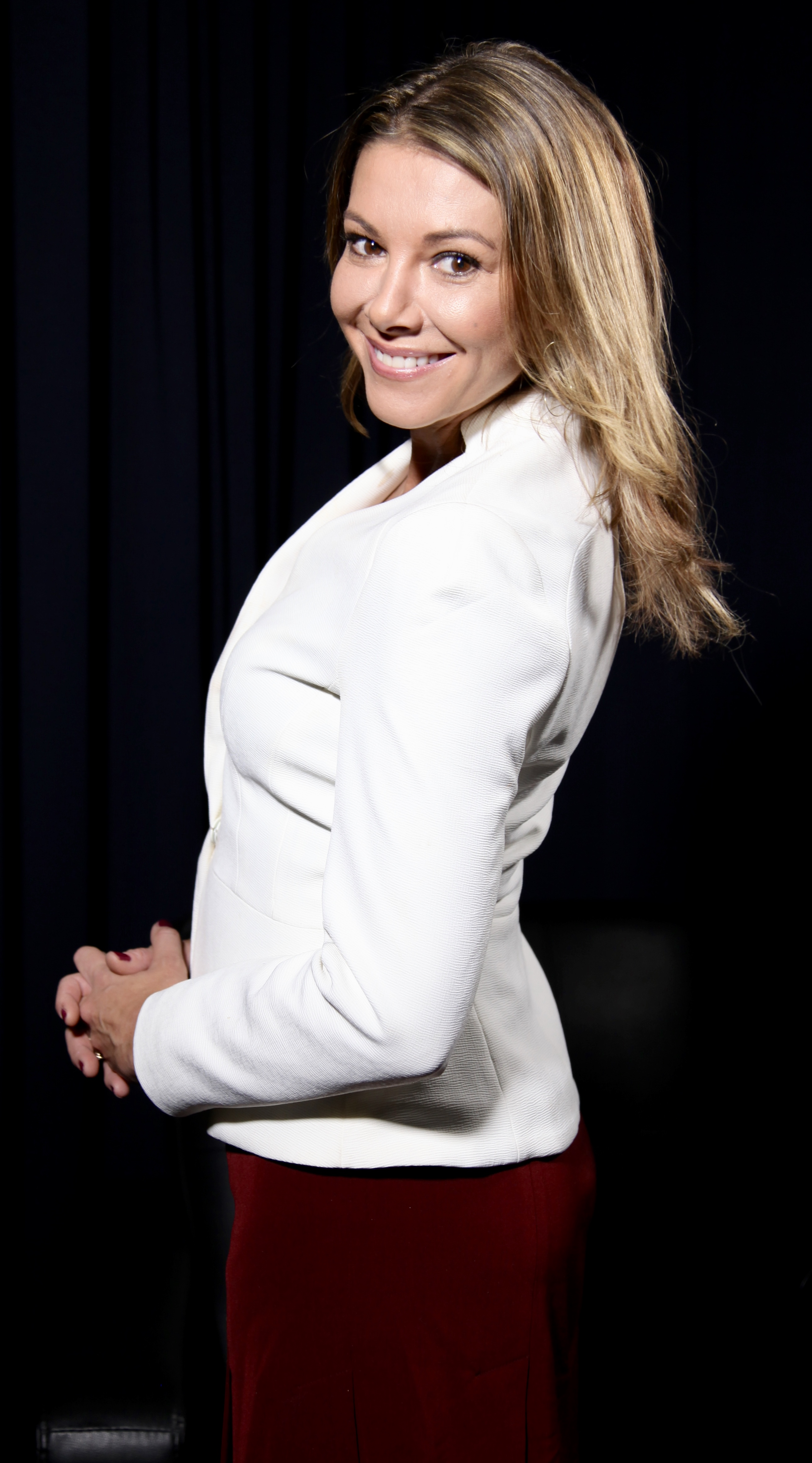
Kiran Chetry, former CNN anchor, is of Chhetri descent

The Central Bureau of Statistics of Nepal classifies Chhetris as a subgroup within the broader social group of Khas Arya (together with Thakuri and Sanyasi/Dasnami). The 2021 census recorded Chhetri population of Nepal as the largest community with a population of 4,796,995 (16.4% of Nepal). Previously, the 2011 Nepal census showed Chhetris as the largest Hindu adherents in the nation with 4,365,113 people which was 99.3% of total Chhetri population. In Nepal's hill districts the Chhetri population rises to 41% compared to 31% Brahmin and 27% other castes. This greatly exceeds the Kshatriya portion in most regions with predominantly Hindu populations.

As per 2021 census, Chhetris are largest caste group in 27 districts of Nepal, increase from 21 districts of 2001 Nepal census and 24 districts of 2011 Nepal census. These twenty seven districts are - Sankhuwasabha district, Okhaldhunga district, Dhankuta district, Morang district, Udayapur district, Dolakha district, Ramechhap district, Gulmi district, Dang district, Salyan district, Western Rukum district, Surkhet district, Dailekh district, Jajarkot district, Dolpa district, Jumla district, Mugu district, Humla district, Bajura district, Bajhang district, Achham district, Doti district, Dadeldhura district, Baitadi district, Darchula district, Kalikot district, and Kanchanpur district.

The district with the largest Chhetri population is Kathmandu district with 424,172 (i.e. 20.7% of the total district population). Chhetris form the second largest demographic group after Newars in the Kathmandu Valley, together with Lalitpur (Patan) and Bhaktapur, with a population of 621,346. Other districts with more than 150,000 Chhetri population are Kailali, Kanchanpur, Dang, Jhapa and Morang.

Province wise, Chhetris are majority demography in Koshi Province, Karnali Province and Sudurpashchim Province. The frequency of Chhetris by province is shown in the table:

Demographics of Chhetris in the Provinces of Nepal
| Province | Percentage of Provincial population | Demographic Status |
|---|---|---|
| Karnali Province | 42.2% | largest |
| Sudurpashchim Province | 41.7% | largest |
| Bagmati Province | 17.4% | 3rd largest |
| Koshi Province | 15% | largest |
| Lumbini Province | 14.2% | 3rd largest |
| Gandaki Province | 13.1% | 3rd largest |
| Madhesh Province | 2.0% | minority |

As per the Public Service Commission of Nepal, Brahmins (33.3%) and Chhetris (20.01%) were the two largest caste groups to obtain governmental jobs in the fiscal year 2017–18, even though 45% governmental seats are reserved for women, Madhesis, lower caste and tribes, and other marginalized groups.

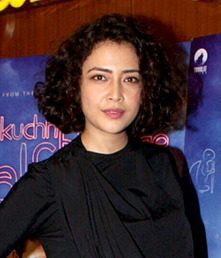
Indian actress Geetanjali Thapa, recipient of National Film Award for Best Actress (2013)

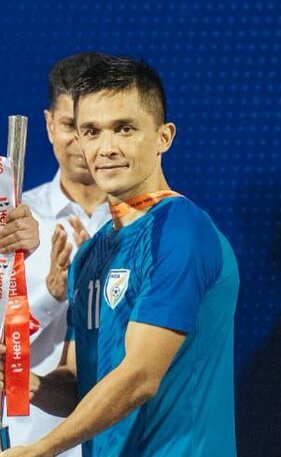
Sunil Chhetri, former Captain of Indian Football National Team

The frequency of Chhetris was higher than national average (16.4%) in the following districts:

- Bajhang (69%)
- Darchula (65.3%)
- Jumla (60.2%)
- Doti (59.9%)
- Bajura (59.5%)
- Salyan (59%)
- Achham (54.6%)
- Dadeldhura (53.7%)
- Western Rukum (53.1%)
- Baitadi (53%)
- Mugu (50.5%)
- Dolpa (47.4%)
- Jajarkot (39.3%)
- Humla (36.6%)
- Dailekh (35.3%)
- Rolpa (35.2%)
- Surkhet (31.7%)
- Dolakha (31.2%)
- Kanchanpur (30.9%)
- Kalikot (29.6%)
- Dang (26.6%)
- Ramechhap (26%)
- Pyuthan (25.6%)
- Kailali (23.8%)
- Gulmi (22.8%)
- Bhaktapur (21.9%)
- Udayapur (21.5%)
- Okhaldhunga (21%)
- Eastern Rukum (20.1%)
- Dhankuta (19.9%)
- Kathmandu (19.8%)
- Tehrathum (19.4%)
- Khotang (19.1%)
- Bhojpur (17.7%)
- Sankhuwasabha (17.3%)
- Lalitpur (18.6%)
- Arghakhanchi (18.1%)
- Baglung (18.1%)
- Myagdi (17.5%)
- Parbat (17.4%)
- Sindhupalchowk (16.9%)
- Jhapa (16.8%)

== Present day ==
Chhetri together with Bahun and Thakuri fall under Khas Arya, who are denied quota and reservations in civil services and other sectors due to their history of socio-political dominance in Nepal. There are no quotas for the Khas community who fall under Bahun-Chhetri-thakuri hierarchy. As per the explanation of legal provisions of Constitution of Nepal, Khas Arya comprises the Brahmin, Kshetri, Thakur and Sanyasi (Dashnami) communities. But they are allowed reservation in federal parliament and provincial legislature. The European Union has been accused of direct interference, creating ethnic strife and negative discrimination towards Khas Arya due to their recommendation to remove the reservation for Khas Aryas.

== Notable people ==
=== Queen Mothers of Nepal ===
- Queen Tripurasundari, Queen mother of Nepal (1806–1832)
- Queen Subarna Prabha Devi, Queen mother of Nepal (1802–1806)
- Queen Aishwarya, Queen mother of Nepal (1971–2001)
- Queen Indra Rajya Lakshmi Devi, Crown princess of Nepal (1940–1950)
- Queen Ratna Rajya Lakshmi Devi, Queen mother of Nepal (1955–1972)
- Queen Lalit Rajeshwori Rajya Lakshmi Devi, Queen mother of Nepal (1881–1893)
- Queen Komal Rajya Laxmi Devi, Queen mother of Nepal (2001–2008)

=== Film industry/Fashion/Arts ===
- Hira Singh Khatri, first Director of Nepalese Film industry
- Ruby Rana, Miss Nepal World (1994), Nepal's first Miss Nepal
- Sugarika KC, Miss Nepal World (2005) and television host
- Rekha Thapa, Nepalese actress and director
- Ashma KC, Miss Nepal World (2024)
- Priyanka Karki, Nepalese actress
- Bhuwan K.C., Nepalese actor, director, producer, singer and filmmaker
- Swastima Khadka, Nepalese actress
- Nischal Basnet, Nepalese actor and director
- Karishma K.C. (Manandhar), prominent Nepalese actress
- Anmol K.C., actor and producer
- Bipana Thapa, Nepalese actress
- Nandita K.C., Nepalese actress
- Sita KC, Nepalese singer
- Kiran KC, Nepalese actor
- Sushil Chhetri, Nepalese actor
- Sushma Karki, Nepalese actress
- Arjun Karki, Nepalese actor
- Shruti Bisht, Indian film and television actress
- Sumi Khadka, Nepalese actress
- Pradeep Khadka, Nepalese actor
- Dilip Rayamajhi, Nepalese actor
- Arpan Thapa, Nepalese actor
- Jharna Thapa, Nepalese actress
- Sunil Thapa, Nepalese actor
- Subeksha Khadka, Nepalese actress
- Ram Thapa, Nepalese singer
- Gyanu Rana, Nepalese singer
- Astha Raut, Nepalese singer
- Sonam Bisht, Indian model and actress
- Karun Thapa, Ghazal writer
- Sashi Rawal, Nepalese singer
- Geetanjali Thapa, Indian actress
- Kiran Chetry, American TV personality
- Babu Bogati, Nepalese singer
- Sanjit Bhandari, Nepalese actor
- Arun Chhetri, Nepalese actor
- Shonal Rawat, India TV anchor
- Bipin Karki, Nepalese actor
- Nidhi Bisht, Indian actress
- Kamal Khatri, Nepalese singer
- Sudarshan Thapa, Nepalese actor and director
- Salon Basnet, Nepalese actor
- Jagat Rawat, Indian actor
- Gajit Bista, Nepalese actor
- Sunil Rawal, film director
- Suhana Thapa, Nepalese actress
- Namrata Thapa, Indian actress
- Ananda Karki, Nepalese singer
- Sharmila Thapa, Nepal-born Indian television host and actress
- Vidhan Karki, Nepali film director
- Narayan Rayamajhi, Nepalese film Director
- Tirtha Kumari Thapa, Nepalese singer
- Rabindra Singh Baniya, Nepalese actor and producer
- Chitrashi Rawat, Indian actress
- Mallika Karki, Nepali singer
- Donal Bisht, Indian television actress
- Navi Rawat, American actress
- Shrisha Karki, late Nepalese actress
- Astha Raut, Nepali singer
- Deepak Rayamajhi, Nepalese film Director
- Gyanu Rana, Nepalese singer
- Kailash Karki, Nepalese comedian
- Roshan Thapa, Nepalese songwriter
- Sujita Basnet, American model and former Miss Universe Nepal
- Bhairav Bahadur Thapa, first dance director of Nepal as well as choreographer and writer
- Shishir Rana, Nepalese actor, director
- Atithi Gautam K.C, youngest singer in the world to release a professional solo album
- Bal Krishna Shamsher Jang Bahadur Rana, Nepalese playwright
- Hari Bhakta Katuwal, prominent poet and lyricist of Nepal
- Bharat Shumsher JBR, late Nepalese politician, Bengali movie director and producer
- Lil Bahadur Chhetri, late Indian writer and recipient of Padmashri awards
- Paramita RL Rana, Nepalese actress and singer
- Kumar Basnet, Nepalese singer, songwriter
- Komal Oli, Nepalese singer
- Tara Devi, born Dol Kumari Karki, legendary late Nepalese singer
- Subhadra Adhikari, Late Nepalese actress and singer
- Suman Karki, Nepalese actor
- Sushant KC, Nepalese singer, songwriter and music producer

=== Politics and administration (non-historical) ===
- Surya Bahadur Thapa, former five-time prime minister of Nepal
- Bidya Devi Bhandari, first woman president of Nepal
- Sher Bahadur Deuba, former prime minister of Nepal
- Kirti Nidhi Bista, former prime minister of Nepal
- Arjun Narasingha K.C., former five-time minister of Nepal and Senior Nepali Congress Leader
- Gagan Thapa, Nepalese politician and General Secretary of the Nepali Congress
- Arzu Rana Deuba, Nepalese Minister of Foreign Affairs
- Chitra Bahadur K.C., former deputy prime minister of Nepal and chairman of the Rashtriya Jana Morcha Party
- Ajay Mohan Bisht, known as Yogi Adityanath; Chief Minister of Uttar Pradesh, India
- Arjun Bahadur Thapa, former SAARC secretary general
- Nayan Bahadur Khatri, longest serving late chief justice of Nepal
- Bhekh Bahadur Thapa, Nepalese central banker and former cabinet minister
- Kamal Thapa, former deputy prime minister, president of Rastriya Prajatantra Party of Nepal,
- Karna Bahadur Thapa, former Minister of Nepal
- Ujwal Thapa, President of Bibeksheel Nepali
- Khum Bahadur Khadka, former minister
- Narayan Khadka, ex minister of urban development
- Hari Bahadur Khadka, Member of 2nd Constituent Assembly
- Kul Bahadur Khadka, Lieutenant General
- Hari Bahadur Basnet, former minister
- Lal Bahadur Basnet, Indian politician
- Mahesh Basnet, former minister
- Mohan Bahadur Basnet, former minister
- Raju Basnet, Indian politician
- Singha Bahadur Basnyat, former Chief (COAS) of Nepal Army
- Rajendra Chhetri (KC), former Head of Nepalese Army
- Tek Bahadur Basnet, Nepalese politician
- Amar Bahadur Thapa, Nepalese politician
- Om Bikram Rana, former inspector general of Nepal Police
- Hari Krishna Karki, Nepali judge and former Chief Justice of Nepal
- Hikmat Kumar Karki, former Chief Minister of Koshi Province
- Kedar Karki, Chief Minister of Koshi Province
- Harish Rawat, former chief minister of Uttarakhand, India
- Lokman Singh Karki, former head of Commission for the Investigation of Abuse of Authority, Nepal
- Ram Karki, former minister of Nepal
- Pradip Shumsher Jang Bahadur Rana, former inspector general of Nepal Police
- Hira Singh Bisht, Indian minister
- Sushila Karki, Nepali jurist and first female Chief Justice of Nepal (2016 – 2017)
- Hira Chandra KC, State Minister of Health and Population of Nepal
- Tirath Singh Rawat, former chief minister of Uttarakhand, India
- Bal Bahadur K.C., former minister of Nepal
- Padma Bahadur Khatri, late former foreign minister of Nepal and Nepalese Ambassador to the United States
- Rajendra Kumar KC, former minister of Nepal
- Pashupati Shamsher Jang Bahadur Rana (born 1941), Nepalese politician, former minister and member of the Rana dynasty
- Hira Singh Bisht, Indian politician
- Jayakumar Jitendrasinh Rawal, Indian minister
- Nilam KC., former Minister of Women, Children and Senior Citizens of Nepal
- Shreedhar Khatri, Nepalese Ambassador to the United States
- Ratna Shumsher Jang Bahadur Rana, former inspector general of Nepal Police
- Gyanendra Bahadur Karki, former minister
- Kul Prasad KC, Chief Minister of Lumbini Province of Nepal
- Bhim Bahadur Rawal, former minister
- Bindu Kumar Thapa, former minister
- Deepak Bohara, Nepalese politician
- Harish Bisht, vice admiral of the Indian Navy
- Ram Bahadur Bohara, former Member of Parliament, Nepal
- Hira Singh Bisht, Indian politician
- Menuka Khand K.C., Nepalese politician
- Navaraj Rawat, former State Minister of Health and population of Nepal
- Keshar Jung Rayamajhi, advisor to late king Birendra Bir Bikram Shah of Nepal
- Top Bahadur Rayamajhi, former deputy prime minister
- Udaya Shumsher Rana, Nepalese politician, former minister
- Devyani Rana, Nepalese princess
- Chanda Karki, Nepalese politician
- Man Prasad Khatri, Nepalese politician and former Member of Parliament
- Karan Mahara, Indian politician
- Harry Bhandari, first Nepalese origin American elected to a state legislature in the United States
- Amrit Kumar Bohara, former minister of Nepal
- Gyanu K.C., Nepalese politician
- Krishna Bahadur Mahara, former home minister of Nepal
- Shakti Bahadur Basnet, former home minister of Nepal
- Dharmaraj K.C., Nepalese politician and Member of Parliament
- Gokarna Bista, former minister of Nepal
- Mahendra Bahadur Pandey, former minister of Nepal
- Dipak Bahadur K.C, Nepalese politician
- Kalpana Bista, first female minister of education of Nepal
- Rajiv Khatri, Nepalese journalist and Member of Parliament, Pratinidhi Sabha

=== Sports ===
- Hari Khadka, football player
- Sabitra Bhandari, Nepalese professional football player
- Sunil Chhetri, Indian football player
- Karan KC, Nepalese cricketer at Nepal national cricket team
- Nirajan Khadka, football player
- Mamata Thapa, Nepalese cricketer
- Paras Khadka, former Captain of Nepal national cricket team
- Anjan KC, football player
- Khare Basnet, Bhutanese footballer
- Neri Thapa, Nepalese cricketer
- Rupesh KC, football player
- Rajendra Rawal, Nepali footballer
- Shiva Thapa, Indian boxer
- Shyam Thapa, Indian footballer
- Sushil KC, football player
- Jatin Singh Bisht, Indian footballer
- Nam Singh Thapa, Nepalese boxer
- Jit Bahadur K.C., first Nepalese athlete to win an international medal in sports (1971)
- Tanka Basnet, Nepalese footballer
- Vaibhav Rawal, Indian cricketer
- Menuka Rawat, Nepalese athlete at the 1988 Summer Olympics
- Ritesh Thapa, Nepalese footballer
- Manoj Katuwal, Nepalese cricketer
- Arjun Kumar Basnet, South Asian Games marathon silver medalist
- Lalit Thapa, Indian footballer
- Avinash Bohara, Nepalese cricketer
- Sagar Thapa, Nepalese footballer
- Parvati Thapa, Nepalese sports shooter
- Kamal Thapa (footballer), Indian footballer
- Raju Basnyat, Nepalese cricketer
- Anita Basnet, Nepalese footballer
- Sanjeeb Bista, Nepalese footballer
- Rubina Chhetry, former captain of Nepalese cricket team
- Bindu Rawal, Nepalese cricketer
- Samjhana Khadka, Nepalese cricketer
- Roma Thapa, Nepalese cricketer
- Kabita Kunwar, Nepalese cricketer
- Pratis GC, Nepalese cricketer
- Manoj Katuwal, Nepalese cricketer
- Deep Karki, Nepalese footballer
- Arik Bista, Nepalese footballer
- Gillespye Jung Karki, Nepalese footballer
- Krishna Khatri, Nepalese footballer
- Anjan Bista, Nepalese footballer
- Rama Singh, former captain of Nepal women's national football team
- Sneh Rana, Nepalese Sport shooter
- Sajana Rana, Nepalese footballer
- Bishal Basnet, Nepalese footballer
- Ganesh Thapa, Nepalese footballer and former president of the All Nepal Football Association (ANFA)
- Karishma Karki, Nepalese swimmer
- Basanta Thapa, Nepalese footballer
- Kamana Bista, Nepalese volleyball player
- Biren Basnet, Bhutanese footballer
- Dil Maya Karki, Nepalese sprinter
- Devu Thapa, Nepalese Olympic judoka
- Chandra Kala Thapa, sprinter
- Gita Rana, Nepalese footballer
- Niru Thapa, Nepalese footballer
- Laxmi Kunwar, first Nepali athlete to represent Nepal in swimming at the Paralympic Games
- George Prince Karki, Nepalese footballer
- Dhruba KC, former coach of Nepal national football team

=== Chief Justices (Supreme Court of Nepal) ===
- Ratna Bahadur Bista
- Nayan Bahadur Khatri
- Dhanendra Bahadur Singh
- Trilok Pratap Rana
- Min Bahadur Rayamajhi
- Sushila Karki
- Cholendra Shumser JBR
- Hari Krishna Karki
- Prakash Man Singh Raut

=== Academia, social work and philanthropy ===
- Dr. Govinda K.C., Nepalese orthopedic surgeon and philanthropic activist
- Dr. Kedar Narsingh KC, president of Nepal Medical Association and former director of the National Tuberculosis Center
- Bhola Thapa, Nepali educationist, researcher, author and the vice chancellor of Kathmandu University
- Dr. Toshima Karki, surgeon and former minister of Nepal
- Gehendra Shumsher, first scientist of Nepal
- Dor Bahadur Bista, late historian and activist
- Yogi Naraharinath (born Balbir Singh Hriksen Thapa), late historian and writer and saint
- Bikash Bista, economist
- Rudra Raj Pande, late prominent educator, writer and historian
- Daulat Bikram Bista, late writer
- Rabi Thapa, Nepalese writer
- Ram Pratap Thapa, founding member of Non Resident Nepali Association
- Bhaskar Thapa, late Nepalese-American engineering expert
- Bhim Bahadur Pande, late historian
- Surya Bahadur KC, late industrialist, founder of Machhapuchhre Bank Ltd, Rara Noodle, 'KC Group Nepal', and Parliamentarian of Nepal
- Uttam Kunwar, late writer and editor
- Kul Bahadur KC, late Nepalese Poet and laureate
- Khagendra Bahadur Basnyat, social worker and activist
- Tejshree Thapa, late Nepalese human rights lawyer
- Jagdish Shumsher Rana, late Nepalese writer
- Dev Kumari Thapa, late Indian writer
- Manjushree Thapa, Canadian writer
- Rupchandra Bista, late activist and philosopher
- Neelam Karki Niharika, Nepalese writer
- Sharmila Thapa, Indian activist
- Madhukar Shamsher Rana, late finance minister and development economist
- Pushpa Basnet, social worker
- Chandra Prakash Baniya, Nepalese educator and writer
- Sony Rana, Nepal's first female pilot
- Swami Narayan Gautam Khatri (Swami Hamsananda), 19th century Hindu saint and founder of Swargadwari Temple

=== Law and order (Head of Nepal Police) ===
- Phuspa Ram KC
- Toran Shumsher J.B.R.
- Rom Bahadur Thapa
- Khadgajeet Baral
- Durlav Kumar Thapa
- Nara Shumsher J.B.R.
- Hem Bahadur Singh
- Ratna Shumsher J.B.R.
- Moti Lal Bohora
- Pradip Shumsher J.B.R.
- Shyam Bhakta Thapa
- Om Bikram Rana
- Kuber Singh Rana
- Shailesh Thapa Chhetri
- Dhiraj Pratap Singh
- Basanta Bahadur Kunwar
- Deepak Thapa
- Dr. Manoj KC

=== Royalties of Chhetri descent ===
- King Prithvi of Nepal
- King Tribhuvan of Nepal
- King Mahendra of Nepal
- King Birendra of Nepal
- King Dipendra of Nepal
- King Gyanendra of Nepal
- Crown Princess Lakshmi
- Princess Shruti Rajya Lakshmi Devi
- Princess Sharada
- Princess Shobha
- Prince Nirajan
- Prince Dhirendra

=== Other notable people ===
- Bir Bhadra Thapa, Kaji of Gorkha kingdom and Thapa dynasty
- Swarup Singh Karki, Dewan in the Kingdom of Nepal
- Abhiman Singh Basnyat and Basnyat dynasty
- Shiva Narayan Khatri, Kaji of Nepal of 18th century
- Karbir Khatri, Kaji of Nepal of 19th century
- Sanak Singh Khatri, 19th century military commander of Nepal
- Bhawani Singh Khatri, Governor (Sardar) of Kingdom of Nepal
- Damodar Pande and Pande dynasty
- Jung Bahadur Rana and Rana dynasty
- Ranabir Khatri, Governor (Sardar) of Gorkha Kingdom
- Indraman Khatri, Governor (Sardar) of Kingdom of Nepal
- Amar Singh Thapa (sanu), Sanukaji of Kingdom of Nepal
- Badakaji Amar Singh Thapa
- Bhimsen Thapa
- Gagan Singh Bhandari, General of Gorkha
- Gaja Simha Khatri, Governor (Sardar) of Gorkha Kingdom/Kingdom of Nepal of 19th century
- Vamsha Raj Khatri, Governor (Sardar) of Gorkha Kingdom
- Chandrabhan Khatri, Governor (Sardar) of Gorkha Kingdom and Kingdom of Nepal
- Mohan Shamsher Jang Bahadur Rana
- Subarna Shamsher Rana, Deputy Prime Minister of Nepal and democracy activist
- Sher Bahadur Thapa, Nepalese Gurkha recipient of the Victoria Cross
- Sanjog Chhetri, Indian army and youngest recipient of Ashoka chakra
- Sher Jung Thapa, recipient of Mahavir Chakra
- Dhan Singh Thapa, recipient of Paramvir Chakra
- Nandlal Thapa, recipient of George cross
- Lal Singh Khatri, first Nepalese person to study English, 19th century lieutenant colonel

== See also ==
- Caste system in India
- Caste system in Nepal
- Ethnic groups in Nepal
- Kshatriya
- Varna (Hinduism)
