= List of people with surname Thapa =

Thapa is a surname originating in medieval Himalayas used by Kshatriyas and Magars of Northern India and Nepal. list provides links to biographies of people who share this common surname.

== Notable people ==
=== A ===
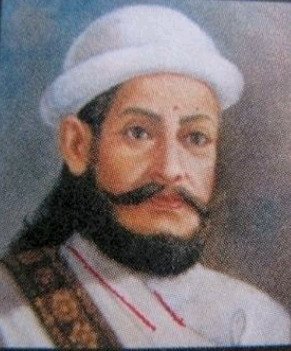
Badakaji Amar Singh Thapa, one of the famous Thapa General

- Amar Bahadur Thapa, Nepalese politician
- Amar Singh Thapa, Nepalese Badakaji General and Supreme Commander of Western front in Anglo-Nepalese War
- Amar Singh Thapa (born 1759), Nepalese Sanukaji General and Governor of Palpa
- Anirudh Thapa, Indian professional footballer
- Arjun Bahadur Thapa, former SAARC Secretary General
- Arpan Thapa, Nepalese director and actor
- Arun Thapa, Nepali singer

=== B ===
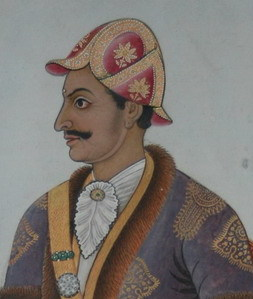
PM Bhimsen Thapa, founder of Thapa dynasty, one of the most famous Thapa kaji

- Balbir Singh Thapa, known as Yogi Naraharinath, Nepalese historian
- Ben Thapa, British opera singer
- Bhakti Thapa, Sardar, Nepalese commander of Deuthal in Anglo-Nepalese War
- Bhaskar Thapa, Nepalese civil engineer and lead designer of Caldecott Tunnel Fourth Bore
- Bhimsen Thapa Mukhtiyar, former Nepalese prime minister
- Bhekh Bahadur Thapa, Nepalese central banker and former cabinet minister
- Bhola Thapa, Nepali educationist, researcher, author and the Vice Chancellor of Kathmandu University
- Bipana Thapa, Nepalese actress
- Bir Bhadra Thapa, Nepalese commander during the country's unification
- Biraj Thapa Magar, Kaji of Gorkha

=== D ===
- Dekendra Thapa, Nepali journalist
- Devu Thapa, Nepalese judoka
- Dhan Singh Thapa, Paramvir Chakra (PVC)
- Dharmapaal Barsingh Thapa, former Chief of Army Staff of the Nepal Army
- Dharmaraj Thapa, titled Jana Kavi Keshari, Nepali poet and songwriter
- Durlav Kumar Thapa, former Nepalese Inspector General of Police

=== G ===
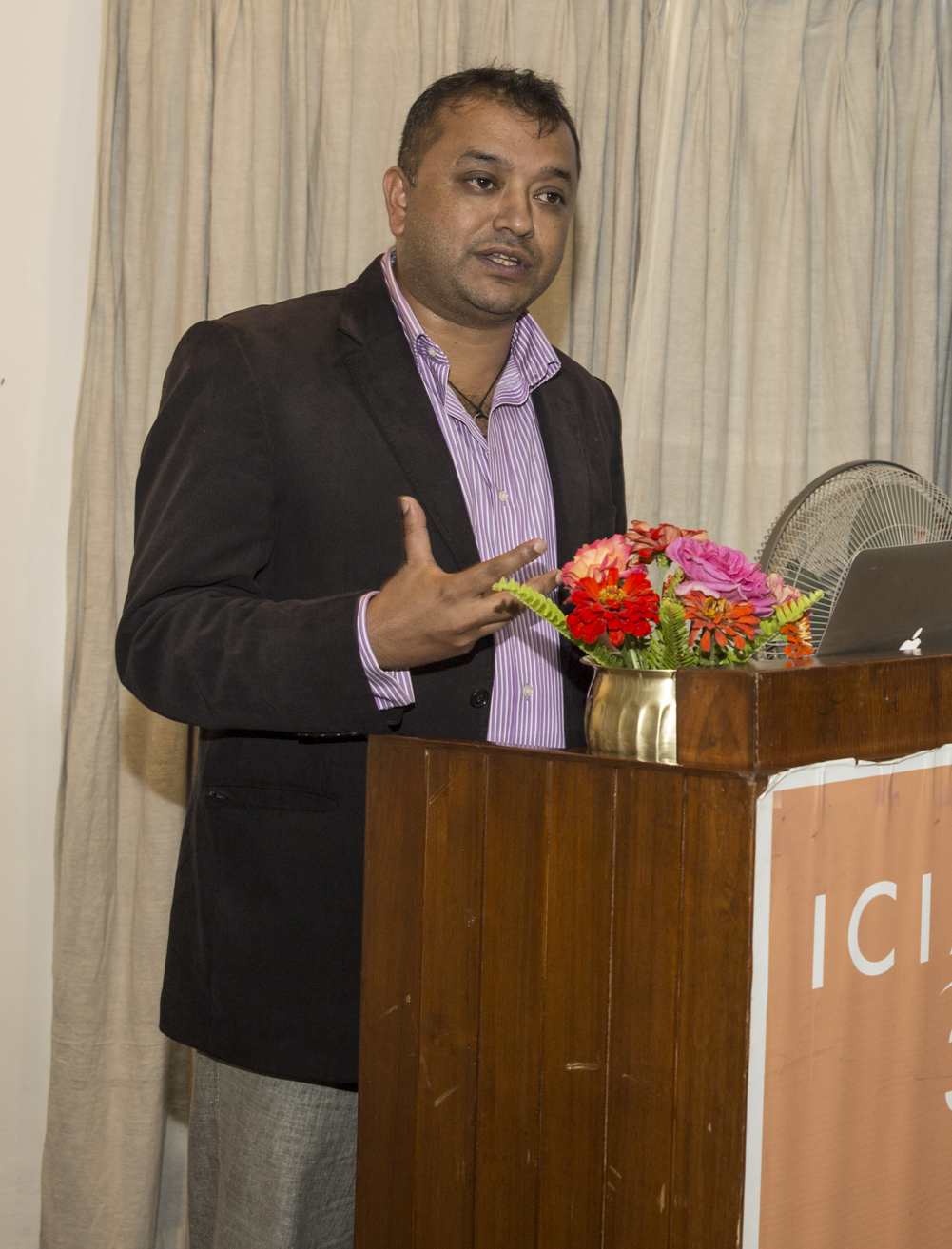
Thapa giving a speech in a program in ICIMOD

- Gagan Kumar Thapa, Nepalese politician and current Minister of Health
- Gajraj Singh Thapa, Nepalese governor of the Ilam district and tea plantation entrepreneur
- Ganesh Thapa, former president of the All Nepal Football Association
- Geetanjali Thapa, Indian actress

=== J ===
- Jharana Thapa, Nepalese actress.

=== K ===
- Kamal Thapa, Current Deputy Prime Minister, President of Rastriya Prajatantra Party Nepal, Monarchist and Hinduism centered Leader
- Karna Bahadur Thapa, Former Minister of Nepal
- Khagendra Thapa Magar, former shortest man recordholder
- Kulbir Thapa; 1st Nepali Victoria Cross holder

=== L ===
- Lakhan Thapa Magar, Nepalese revolutionary
- Lalbahadur Thapa, Victoria Cross holder
- Lalit Thapa, Indian footballer
- Leeladhwaj Thapa, Nepalese author and recipient of the Madan Puraskar
- Lily Thapa, Nepalese entrepreneur

=== M ===
- Mamata Thapa, Nepalese cricketer
- Manjushree Thapa, Nepalese-Canadian, English-language author
- Mathabar Singh Thapa, former Prime Minister of Nepal

=== N ===
- Nain Singh Thapa, Nepalese Kaji and General
- Nam Singh Thapa, Nepalese boxer
- Namrata Thapa, Indian actress
- Neri Thapa, Nepalese cricketer
- Netrabahadur Thapa, Nepalese soldier and Victoria Cross recipient

=== P ===
- Parvati Thapa (born 1970), Nepalese sports shooter
- Purna Chandra Thapa, Nepalese general
- Pyar Jung Thapa, Former Chief of Army Staff of Nepal Army

=== Q ===
- Queen Tripurasundari of Nepal; Queen Consort of King Rana Bahadur Shah

=== R ===
- Rabi Thapa, Nepalese writer
- Ram Thapa, Nepalese singer, musician
- Ram Pratap Thapa, Honorary Consul General in Cologne
- Ranabir Singh Thapa, Commander of Makwanpur Axis at Anglo-Nepalese War
- Ranadhoj Thapa, Former Deputy Prime Minister of Nepal
- Ranajor Singh Thapa, Commander of Nahan Axis at Anglo-Nepalese War
- Rekha Thapa, Nepalese actress
- Ritesh Thapa, Nepalese footballer
- Rom Bahadur Thapa, former Nepalese Inspector General of Police
- Roshan Thapa, Nepalese songwriter

=== S ===
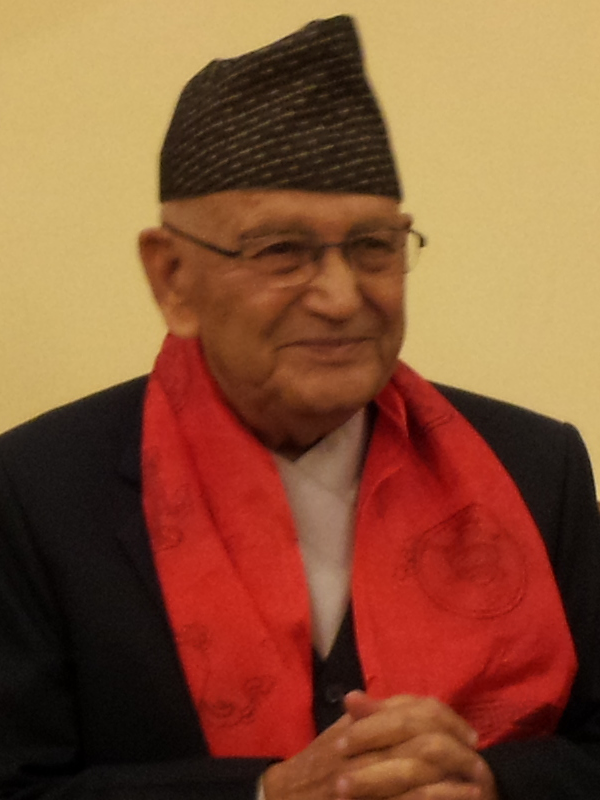
Surya Bahadur Thapa, former five times Prime Minister of Nepal

- Sagar Thapa, Nepalese footballer
- Shailesh Thapa Chhetri, 28th and current Inspector General of Nepal Police
- Sharmila Thapa, Nepal-born Indian television host and actress
- Sher Bahadur Thapa, Nepalese soldier and recipient of the Victoria Cross
- Sher Jung Thapa, Mahavir Chakra (MVC)
- Shiva Thapa, Indian boxer
- Shyam Thapa, Indian footballer
- Shyam Bhakta Thapa, Ex-Nepal Police Chief
- Suhana Thapa, Nepalese actress
- Sunil Bahadur Thapa, Nepali politician
- Sunil Thapa, Nepalese actor
- Surya Bahadur Thapa, former Prime Minister of Nepal

=== T ===
- Tejshree Thapa, Nepali human rights lawyer
- Tirtha Kumari Thapa, Nepali singer

=== U ===
- Ujir Singh Thapa, Nepalese commander in the Anglo-Nepalese War
- Ujwal Thapa, President of Bibeksheel Nepali

=== Y ===
- Yagya Bahadur Thapa, Nepalese soldier

== Fictional ==
- Jemadar Thapa, a guest cast played by Ernie Reyes Jr. in drama NCIS: Los Angeles (season 5)
- Thapa, a character from the video game Kane & Lynch: Dead Men
