= Women for Human Rights =

Organisation in Nepal

Women for Human Rights, single women group (WHR)
- Founded: 1995
- Founder: Lily Thapa
- Type: Not for profit, community service
- Purpose: Single women's rights and advocacy
- Headquarters: Kathmandu, Nepal
- Website: whr.org.np

Women for Human Rights, single women group (WHR) is an organization which works to secure the political, social, cultural and economic rights of single women in Nepal. It was founded by Lily Thapa. It works in 73 districts and 1550 village development committees, with over 100,000 single female members.

== Background ==
Gender discrimination is the stark and shameful reality of a country facing Nepal, a country that marches on the path of progress and aims to achieve modernity. Violence against women is pervasive and to this day, remains marked by acute poverty, inequality and marginalization, especially in the case of single women. Research clearly indicates the horrific situation of women in Nepal, caused by the age-old norms of a male-dominated society. According to the 2011 Nepal Demographic Health Survey, one in every five women between the ages of 15 and 49 experiences domestic violence at least once in their life. Despite the legal age for marriage being 20, 41% of women are married before they turn 18. The 2015 Constitution of Nepal has established equal rights to property for spouses, thereby prohibiting gender discrimination. The Civil Code of Nepal however, limits the rights of inheritance of unmarried daughters, as it is automatically assumed that once married, they will have access to property through their husband.

== About ==
Women in Nepal are subject to heavy discrimination in various aspects of everyday life. Be it cultural or local traditions, or even certain laws and policies; women must face all manner of stigma-driven roadblocks. The situation of widows (single women) is far worse, as they are unjustly persecuted and marginalized by the pervasive outlook of society. There also exist, in prevalence, certain religious and traditional practices in Nepal which are detrimentally harmful for the physical and mental health of the women upon whom they are inflicted. WHR was founded with the basic objective of encouraging single women to step out of the confines of their homes and share their sorrows, woes, fears and frustrations with counselors, as well as other women with similar problems. Initially, sharing opportunities were provided at monthly forums, where experts from various developmental fields were invited to share their respective knowledge and experiences with the group. These sessions proved quite fruitful, as single women found solace and relief by sharing their problems with others, thus realizing a wonderfully conducive group atmosphere. After two years of such informal group meetings, WHR was finally registered as a formal organization in 1994. WHR defines widows as 'single women', a change in terminology that has been put into force since the word widow is viewed with much disdain in Nepali society, thus inflicting a lot of humiliation and agony upon the women. Ever since its inception, WHR has strived to create an active, interconnected and dedicated network of single women, at both the national and international levels. Today, WHR works in 74 districts and 1550 VDCs (village development committees). WHR has over 100,000 single women members as well as 2000 single-women offshoot groups.

== Objectives ==
The WHR work model functions within the framework of certain basic objectives. These are specifically designed to encompass broadly, all the major and minor endeavors of the organization. The objectives are:

- To raise the socio-cultural, legal, political and economic status of Nepalese women as well as their families.
- To mainstream the rights of single women in development, humanitarian and peace-building initiatives.
- To lobby and advocate for meaningful participation of single women at decision-making levels in the social, economic and political spheres.
- To enhance the capabilities and confidence of single women, and to enable them in their journey toward becoming agents of change and progressing themselves.

== WHR work model ==
WHR works primarily with single women; inclusive of widows, wives of missing husbands, divorcees, unmarried women of 35 years of age and older, as well as women separated yet not divorced from their husbands. WHR has developed various unique methods to give a strong voice to single women, so as to bring together widows of all categories from all sides of the conflict, on a level platform that is free from the shadows of caste, ethnicity or political background. WHR employs a well-structured strategic approach in order to ensure maximum effectiveness with which objectives are achieved.

The basic strategic work model of WHR envisages changing traditional stereotypes and mindsets that bar widows from participating and accessing resources. In addition to this, WHR also aims to change policies that are discriminatory against widows and provide them with their basic rights. The basic end to this is to bring about a widespread societal realization that widows make for valuable social capital. WHR's strategic plan focuses on five framework pillars:

- Pillar 1 (socio-cultural empowerment and movement)

The key intention of this pillar is to help build a more tolerant society as a whole. It focuses mainly on the socio-cultural aspects of single women and creates awareness, both amongst victims of cultural torture and perpetrators of such torture.

- Pillar 2 (economic empowerment and mobilization)

The major goal of this movement is the empowerment of single women, so that they form groups and networks, thus becoming actively engaged in income generation and the subsequent enhancement of their respective livelihood capacities.

- Pillar 3 (justice, human rights and peace)

This program involves using a strong advocacy campaign (and lobbying) for an appropriate regulatory framework to address human rights issues and enhance the capacity of single women groups and networks in peacebuilding and transitional justice systems.

- Pillar 4 (local governance)

Through its de-centralizing approach, WHR enables single women groups and networks to articulate demands, improve their situation and secure rights from local bodies and service providers, with the end goal being the transformation of said groups into self-governing institutions.

== The Nepal earthquake of 2015 and relief effort by WHR ==
On April 25, 2015, Nepal was struck by a 7.6 - magnitude earthquake, with an equally powerful subsequent aftershock on May 12. The pre-existing gender inequality in Nepal was only further accelerated by this calamity, and it comes as no surprise that women in particular suffered the most in its aftermath. Over 87,000 people died, half of whom were women. Furthermore, 23,500 people were injured with over eight million people affected across 31 districts, 53% of whom were women. Over 850,000 houses were either destroyed or damaged, 26% of which belonged to women heads-of-households. Also, health facilities covering 1.4 million women (including girls of reproductive age) were drastically affected, 93,000 of whom were pregnant. The earthquake destroyed scores of houses, which left 92% of the women and their families under tents and tarpaulins. Research also suggests that 24.4% of women in Kathmandu lost their property papers, with as many as 49% losing their citizenship certificates; with the replacement of such crucial documents being slow and scattered. Drinking water facilities also took a sizeable hit from the earthquake, making the situation even direr for the women, many of whom had to travel half an hour or more and queue up for hours on end for just a few liters of water. The bad water situation was superseded only by the damage to sanitation facilities, with 43% of women reporting much damage to their toilets. Hygiene was a matter of high concern, with only 23% of women having received appropriate hygiene kits, leaving 60% of women in dearth.

=== Relief effort ===
WHR conducted a rapid assessment survey of the earthquake-affected areas in order to identify the immediate community needs, the status of environmental sanitation and other vital factors pertaining to the subsequent relief effort. In collaboration with CARE Nepal, WHR initiated and implemented the Nepal Earthquake Response at Gorkha; the aim of which was to sensitize and enhance the responsive capabilities of earthquake-affected communities. The collaboration, which began on May 1, 2015, also incorporated the active assistance of five working VDCs of Gorkha, namely Mirkot, Khoplang, Dhuwakot, Saurpani and Chhoprak. The youth wing of WHR was also actively involved in the relief work, taking control of the volatile situation and playing a major part in the various relief and aid teams. The extensive work done by the seven teams (procurement, assembling, packing, fund-raising, photography, social media and distribution) in the regions of Gorkha, Dhading, Nuwakot, Sindhupalchowk, Kathmandu, Bhaktapur and Lalitpur, was paramount in creating an efficient line of assistance for the victims.

== Major initiatives and programs ==
=== Opportunity Fund ===
The Opportunity Fund has been created as a solution to the problems faced by single women and their children by providing them with scholarships for education through formal as well as non-formal channels. This scholarship program is aimed at the upliftment of the children of single women who are at risk of discrimination and violence. So far, the Opportunity Fund has successfully provided scholarships for over 1000 children, as well as for many women willing to pursue their higher studies. The fund also helps remedy the socio-economic situation of many girls, by assisting them with their formal and informal education. The fund has also supported the formation of the Sachetana Youth Club, whose primary goal is to raise public awareness regarding issues of single women in Nepal.

=== Aadhar – credit saving program ===
Aadhar, which means 'support' in Nepali, is basically a collateral-free micro-credit program that provides loans with low interest to single women. Aadhar is a crucial aspect of single women's empowerment, as initiated by WHR, and it encourages more single women entrepreneurs by serving as a backbone for small businesses. Aadhar caters to all women who are registered members (fitting criteria) of WHR, the priority is however, given to single women. The Aadhar program has been instrumental in changing the lives of numerous single women, who have been able to shed the coils of insufficiency and successfully start small-scale businesses, thus attaining economic independence. Overall, the program has greatly raised the self-confidence and level of independence of single women; as many of them are now involved in self-sustaining activities like livestock farming, agro-farming, mushroom growing, catering, grocery and tailoring shops and cart shops, among many others.

=== Single Women Entrepreneurs Group (SWEG) ===
The SWEG program is a vital organ of the Aadhar credit program since its key goal is to provide single women with skill development training for various income-generating activities. The mode of operation employed by SWEG involves harnessing the skills and experiences of single women who are excluded from the mainstream job market and developing those skills in innovative ways, thus creating employment opportunities in a conducive work environment. What began initially as a small business known as Single Women Corner has now expanded its horizons by aiding hundreds of single women to become empowered. All of the skills and services taught in SWEG training have been mentioned in the above (Aadhar). A simultaneous accomplishment is the production and promotion of Nepalese handicrafts, the craft of which is taught as one of the courses under SWEG. Women from rural areas also produce indigenous handicrafts using the limited resources available that are made to order. Other like items include household and individual officially purposed items, as well as catering to hospitals and various other religious and cultural ceremonies. Apart from these, SWEG also conducts a full-scale catering service.

=== Chhahari – safe spaces ===
The meaning of chhahari in Nepalese is literally 'safe space', and the initiative provides a shade of solidarity to the single women. Chhahari spaces are created for vulnerable single women affected by conflict and disaster, and administer various skill development courses as well as counseling, all with the objective of raising the self-confidence and independence of single women, thus enabling them to reintegrate with dignity in a society that they were once ostracized by. WHR regards women as vital elements of change, both in the process of societal as well as infrastructural development. Due to a lack of proper provision for protection or service opportunities for single women, thousands of women are displaced and forced to work in the informal sector. Such circumstances have prompted WHR to develop Chhahari 'safe spaces', where women from all backgrounds and societal classes have a level ground upon which to nurture their skills and become self-sufficient. Chhahari also provides shelter for single women with small children who are in need of temporary shelter. Each Chhahari shelter is equipped with four basic sections, namely: Healing Centre, Resource/Administrative Sector, Community Learning Centre and Economic Opportunity Centre. The purpose of this is to ensure proper counseling and a skill-developmental, child-friendly environment that maintains an up-to-date database on all those seeking its assistance. WHR has built Chhahari spaces in five developmental regions of Nepal, including shelters in the cities of Kathmandu, Kavre, Surkhet, Dhankuta, Ropla, Gorkha and others.

=== Raahat ===
Raahat, meaning 'relief', is purposed at the empowerment and rehabilitation of CAW (conflict-affected women) and their children from traumatic experiences, all of which is done through the provision of various services such as psycho-social counseling, legal aid, scholarships, skill development and micro-credit loan schemes. For its legal provisions, Raahat has developed a lucid legal booklet containing vital legal information on provisions for conflict-affected individuals. For its most important function, Raahat maintains effective communication between the concerned Ministries of the Nepal Government and CAW, regarding important matters like compensation, pensions etc. Other bodies that Raahat is in constant contact with are: Gender and Transitional Justice in Nepal organized by OHCHR, ICTJ as well as the Advocacy Forum. Other local NGOs are also kept in the loop of activities, so as to facilitate the exchange of information on justice for CAW during the transitional phase in the development of Nepal.

- Legal toolkit

Raahat has developed a lucid and detailed legal toolkit containing useful information regarding CAW, government initiatives for them, as well as vital data on transitional justice. The document also includes a list of international organizations that provide support and counseling for women, especially CAW. The self-help aspect of the toolkit includes measures to be taken in cases of violence and national and international mechanisms regarding justice in such situations.

- Nispakchya

The decade-long conflict that pervaded Nepal led to numerous violations of different rights as well as laws. Many said violations took place in the case of women, and Nispakchya was established as a result in 2014 in order to safeguard the integrity of and provide justice for CAW. Being a common platform for women who had been victimized during the armed conflict, the initiative deals with the issues of these women and circulates information to the concerned stakeholders. The network of Nispakchya is spread over ten districts in Nepal, with the ultimate objective of encompassing the entire country.

=== RED Color Movement ===
The color red symbolizes womanhood and is the color presented to every young girl when she comes of age. But these very colors are torn away from her when a woman becomes a widow. Her ornaments are broken, her 'sindhood' is wiped away and she is forced to wear white for the remainder of her days. After the death of the husband a woman is labeled and marked as an outcast, because of which the white saree that is forced upon her also serves as an apt metaphor for the dry and hard lives single women lead. The philosophy of the red color movement was this: single women in the country should not be distinguishable from the rest just because of the color they wear. Several women stood in solidarity with this movement as a sign that it was time to do away with these social malpractices and to bring equality to all single women. The movement was the very personification of the WHR motto: No discrimination on the basis of marital status. 250 young single women and six elderly single women broke the social stigma and rallied for the Red Movement in Rupendehi. The Red Movement had been initiated by WHR since 2002 in Dhading. The program was initiated with a rally which was later followed by felicitating single women with red-colored bangles and vermilion. A major tool employed by this ground-breaking movement was the Red Tika Challenge.

==== Red Tika Challenge ====
The Red Tika Challenge was an online campaign aimed at raising awareness about gender inequality and the plight of widows in the country. The challenge asked people to post a picture with the color red and share it on social media and then further challenge more people to stand in solidarity with single women by posting pictures of their own. The movement gained a lot of momentum and went viral on Facebook, with more than 60,000 youths taking up the challenge as well as several public figures.

"The color red symbolizes passion and life so our culture prohibits widows from wearing anything red. Women are forced to wear only white attire, which I believe takes a toll on their beauty. So, the main aim of this campaign is to change that mentality," says Lily Thapa, founder of WHR Nepal, who herself kicked off the challenge with #redtikachallenge. The campaign wants to drive home the message that the marital status of a woman should not decide which color she can or cannot wear, emphasizes Lily. The movement aimed to break age-old notions and successfully managed to reach and involve the younger generation. "Color is purely a woman's choice. Society shouldn't dictate it," said Lilly.

== Major changes made in legislation ==
Despite legislative ratification at various levels, single women are constantly denied their basic social, political and economic rights. Their crucial roles in society as agents of change, peacebuilders and sole supporters of their respective families are hardly given adequate recognition. For a number of years now, WHR has constantly been lobbying and raising awareness regarding the dire situation of widows (single women) in the country, and as a result, it has been successful in changing six major discriminatory laws against single women in Nepal:

Before	After
The deceased husband's property must be returned after remarriage	The deceased husband's property need no longer be returned after remarriage
Selling or changing property ownership requires the consent of adult sons or unmarried daughters, or both	Selling or changing property ownership no longer requires the consent of adult sons or unmarried daughters
Single women must wait until they reach 35 years of age, so as to inherit the property of their deceased husband	Single women can inherit the property of their deceased husband whenever they wish, even before they turn 35
Single women must remain in the chastity of their deceased husband in order to inherit his property	Single women need not remain in the chastity of their deceased husband in order to inherit his property
Single women need to secure consent of a male family member, if they wish to obtain a passport	Single women no longer require the consent of a male family member, if they wish to obtain a passport
Government of Nepal issued a Budgetary policy on providing NRs.50000 to a widow and the man who marries her	WHR carried filed a writ petition against this policy at the Supreme Court level, following which the Supreme Court issued an interim order barring the implementation of said policy

=== Work done for vaikalyas (child/underage widows) ===
The condition of vaikalyas in Nepal is said to be even worse than that of adult widows, with customs, practices and codes of conduct being far more stringent and suffocating. The child widows are the unfortunate recipients of heavy contempt and are ostracized as outcasts. They are labeled as 'cursed' and blamed for the death of their husband. WHR, along with Pro Public, filed a petition for the rights of vaikalyas in 2009. After three years of heavy demonstrations and lobbying, the Supreme Court officially declared these traditions ill-practices in 2012. The Supreme Court also directed the Ministry of Women, Children and Social Welfare to establish a working committee, specifically aimed at the permanent elimination of any such practice.

== Achievements ==
At the international level:

- Received Special Consultative Status in ECOSOC (Economic and Social Council), UN.
- Organized the 2005 International Conference on Capacity Building of Single Women (Widows). This conference declared the Kathmandu Widows Charter on the basis of human rights instruments such as the Convention on the Elimination of all Forms of Discrimination Against Women (CEDAW), United Nations Commission on the Status of Women (CSW), United Nations Security Council Resolution 1325, and the Beijing Platform of Action.
- Works as the Secretariat for the South Asian Network for Widows' Empowerment in Development (SANWED), which is a new initiative in the South Asian region to uphold widows' basic human rights in all aspects of their lives.
- Organized an international conference on widowhood: "Widow voices – Empowered" 2010; in effect of which the Kathmandu Declaration was developed, which demanded to have a special rapporteur for widows.
- WHR, in coordination with SANWED, successfully mainstreamed the issue of widowhood into the Colombo Declaration at the South Asian Association for Regional Cooperation Summit.

At the national level:

- Lobbied the government to collect data on widows, making Nepal the second nation in the South Asian region after India to have data on widowhood at the national level.
- Helped promote the issues of single women at national and international levels by incorporating issues of single women in the 10th and 11th five-year plans of Nepal.
- Formed the National Network of Single Women, which includes the Ministry of Women and other national and international organizations.
- Thousands of women trained and mobilized as agents of change, resulting in overall reduction of violence at the local level.
- WHR was included in the drafting, preparation and enforcement of the first ever Emergency Trust Fund solely for single women, set up by the Ministry of Women, Children and Social Welfare (MoWCSW). This assignment also included the development of a national action plan for widows in Nepal.
- The Nepalese government allocated a special budget for Social Security allowances (widows' allowances) for all single women, regardless of age, in the 2011–2012 National Policy Program.
- The Nepalese government has also decided to increase allowances for single women in the annual budget for the fiscal year 2016–2017.
