= Rakshya Rana =

Pilot

- रक्षा राणा
- Born: 7 November 1967 (age 57)
- Known for: First Nepali female pilot
- Parents: Ganga Gurung Rana (mother); Noor Pratap JB Rana (father)

Rakshya Rana (Nepali: रक्षा राणा) (born 7 November 1967) is the first Nepali female pilot.

== Biography ==
She was born on 7 November 1967 as the daughter of Ganga Gurung Rana and Noor Pratap JB Rana. Her father, Noor Pratap JB Rana was an industrialist who established the famous Goldstar shoes in Nepal.

== Training ==
Rana got her training from Hoffman Pilot Center in Broomfield, Colorado for her private pilot license. She then moved to Addison, Dallas, Texas where she completed the rest of the training and obtained her FAA commercial Pilot license with Multi-Engine and Instrument Rating in April 1988. It took her 11 months in total to complete the course.

She obtained her aviation license from Civil Aviation Authority of Nepal in 1992. She was 24 years old when she flew professionally for the first time, with the domestic airline, Everest Air.

== Debate over the first Nepali female pilot ==
Rana obtained her aviation license from CAANl in 1992 under license number 123. However, Rana's title as first female pilot is contested by Sony Rana who obtained her license in 1991 under license number 119. According to the Pilot Safety Department Head of CAAN, Raju Shrestha, Sony Rana is the first female Nepali pilot with a Nepali aviation license whereas Rakshya Rana is the first Nepali female pilot even though she had an American license initially.
