= Khagendra Bahadur Basnyat =

Nepalese social activist

- Born: Jan 20 1929; Kathmandu, Nepal
- Died: 1977 (aged 47–48); Kathmandu

Khagendra Bahadur Basnyat (Nepali: खगेन्द्रबहादुर बस्न्यात; 1929–1977) was a Nepalese social activist.

He was born in 1929 in Dillibazar, Kathmandu, Nepal. He was diagnosed with a rare hip disease that "confined him to bed for the rest of his life".

Basnyat founded various organisations including the Nepal Blind and Disabled Association, and Disabled Society of Nepal to help disabled people in Nepal. He died in 1977.
