= Singha Bahadur Basnyat =

His Excellency General Singha Bahadur Basnyat
- महारथी श्री सिँह बहादुर बस्न्यात

Commander-in-Chief of Nepal Army
- In office 10 May 1970 – 10 May 1975
- Preceded by: Surendra Bahadur Shah
- Succeeded by: Guna Shamsher JBR

Personal details
- Born: 1919 Thamel, Kathmandu
- Parent: Col. Bhakta Bahadur Basnet (father)

Military service
- Rank: General

Singha Bahadur Basnyat (Note: Not to be confused with Nepalese Ambassador to Britain, late Dr. Singha Bahadur Basnyat, husband of Princess Jyotshana Basnyat of Nepal) is a Nepalese soldier and former Commander-in-Chief of the Nepal Army. He was third son of Colonel Bhakta Bahadur Basnet. He attended a meeting at China alongside PM Nagendra Prasad Rijal and other high-ranking officials. He belonged to Khaptari Basnyat clan.

== Sources ==
- Khatri, Shiva Ram (1999), Nepal Army Chiefs: Short Biographical Sketches, University of Michigan: Sira Khatri
- Karki, Yuba Raj Singh (1983), Nepal Almanac: A Book of Facts, University of Michigan
- United States Foreign Broadcast Information Services (1974), Daily Report: People's Republic of China, University of Michigan: U.S. Foreign Broadcast Information Services
