= Lily Thapa =

Nepalese activist

Dr.Lily Thapa PHD
- लिली थापा
- Born: Kathmandu, Nepal
- Education: Tribhuwan University, Nepal
- Occupation: Social worker /activist
- Years active: 1994-present
- Known for: WHR (Women for Human Rights), SANWED, Sankalp, NHRC(National Human Rights Commission)
- Spouse: (Late) Major Dr. Amir Thapa
- Children: 3 Atup Thapa, Anul Thapa, Amun Thapa
- Parent(s): (Rtd)Lt.General Human Singh Basnyat, Smt. Narendra Kumari Basnyat
- Website: http://whr.org.np/

Dr.Lily Thapa is social worker, lecturer, writer and founder of Women for Human Rights, an organization that fights for Nepalese widows' rights.

== Life and education ==
Lily Thapa was born in Kathmandu, Nepal. A daughter of an army general, she showed high aptitude and academic promise from a very young age, passing her high school at just the age of 16, from Padma Kanya College, Nepal. She also went on to attain a bachelor's degree in psychology and home science from the same institute. Following a gap of some years, Lily secured a master's degree in Sociology and Anthropology, from Tribhuwan University. She spent subsequent years in Sweden where she completed another Post Graduation in Women-in-management at Luleo University. In 2012, Lily returned to her alma mater seeking her PhD in Sociological Aspects on Impacts of conflict in Nepal. She attained her doctorate degree in 2024.

Lily was 29 when her husband, an army doctor, died in the Gulf War in 1994. She had been running a primary school, but as a widow she was left with almost no social status under the norms of Nepalese society. During this period she became aware of the discrimination faced by widows in Nepal. As head of WHR (Women for Human Rights), she has since worked with over 500,000 women.

== Career ==
Lily specializes in the fields of social work, teaching, counselling and other like activities. In 1990, she founded the RoseBud School, where she stayed on as Principal, until she sold it in 1996, so as to focus on her women's rights organization.

=== WHR ===
One day a Jesuit priest from Lily's children's boarding school approached her, asking her help in speaking with another young woman who was suffering from the throes of widowhood, in an effort to help her find solace. And so Lily, herself being 45-days widowed, went to the home of the mother-in-law of the young woman. The young woman, Laxmi, told Lily a horrific tale of an unhappy marriage, and sexual abuse at the hands of her brother-in-law, moving Lily a great deal and spurring her into resolute action. Thus began in 1992, a 2-year long stint of monthly informal discussion-based sharing sessions/meetings for widows (single women), presided over by Lily as well as occasional talks from experts. These sessions proved quite fruitful as they provided an opportunity for widows (single women) to share their problems and stories with one another, thus helping them achieve relief through the solace of togetherness. Then in 1995, WHR (Women for Human Rights) was registered as a formal organization. Today, Lily has grown WHR into one of Nepal's largest NGO's, encompassing almost the entire length and breadth of the nation, with over 1500 VDC's (Village Development Committees) and a total of over 200,000 single women under its wing.

== Current Affiliations ==
Over the years Lily has built up and garnered professional affiliations with various organizations that are involved in social works, teaching, counselling, rehabilitation and other such fields. She is currently involved with her old intermediate high school, Padma Kanya College, as a lecturer/visiting faculty. She is the President of the Sankalp foundation that is involved in the co-ordination of a large network of women organizations, with the aim of implementing the National Action Plan on UNSCR1325 and 1820. Lily is also the General-Secretary of SANWED (South Asian Network of Widows’ Empowerment and Development), an organisation that attempts to mainstream the issues of South Asian women into major policy, through extensive lobbying. She also serves as an Advisor for the Nispakchya foundation, which is a network of conflict affected women (CAW). Liliy is a key member of the think tank of the Ministry of Women, Children and Social Welfare, of the Govt of Nepal.

== Published works ==
Over the years Lily Thapa has developed and published various pieces of literature on gender security, women's rights and empowerment, as well as multiple training manuals. Here are some of her most notable publications:

- Published book on Role of Women for Peace-building in Nepal–2008
- Published book on An Understanding on Gender–2008
- Published handbook on Transitional Justice in Nepal-2010
- Published book on Status of Single Women in Nepal–2010
- Published Handbook on Women, Peace and Security-2011
- Developed training manual and handbook on UNSCR1325 for the security forces-2014
- Developed curriculum on women, peace and security for class 9 and 10- 2017

== Awards ==
Throughout her career as a social worker and educator, Lily Thapa has received various awards and accolades recognizing her dedicated service to the cause of gender equality in Nepal, and toward the community as a whole:

- Prabal Gorkha Dakshin Bahu Award-by the President of Nepal- 2013: for her contribution towards women empowerment
- Best Social Entrepreneur Award-by the Ministry of Women, Children and Social Welfare-2008
- Woman Manager of the Year (2007)-by Management Association of Nepal (MAN)
- Ashoka Fellow Award-by Ashoka International USA-2003
- Synergos Fellowship-2012
- Social Worker of the Year-2008
