= Ananda Karki =

Nepali Singer

Ananda Karki आनन्द कार्की
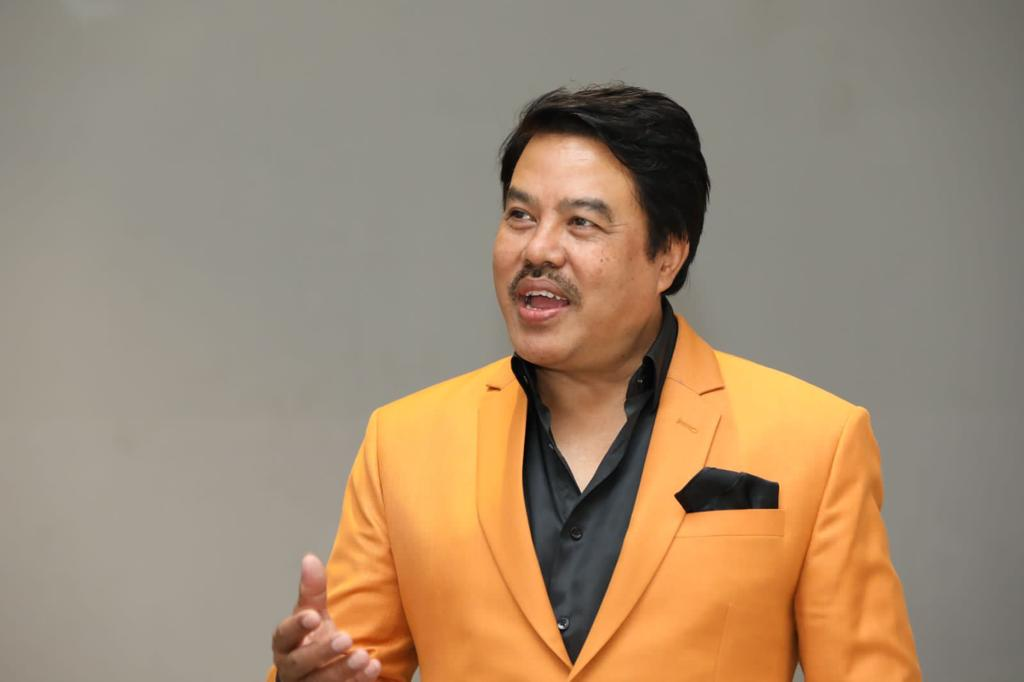
- Ananda Karki at a musical program

Background information
- Born: 20 January 1967 (age 59); Solukhumbu, Nepal
- Origin: Nepal
- Genres: Nepali; Folk; Playback; Modern
- Occupations: Playback singer; Folk singer; Musician
- Instruments: Vocals; Harmonium
- Years active: 1990–present
- Labels: Music Nepal; Sarang Music; Audio Vision

Ananda Karki (born 20 January 1967) is a prominent Nepali singer known for his contributions to Nepali music as a playback and folk singer. With a career spanning over three decades, Karki has established himself as one of Nepal's most recognizable voices, particularly known for his hit song "Jiwan ma Khola Tarnu chha."

== Early life and education ==
Ananda Karki was born on 20 January 1967 in Solukhumbu, Nepal. He developed an interest in music from an early age.

Before pursuing music professionally, Karki worked in a slipper factory, showcasing his determination to overcome humble beginnings through his musical talent.

== Musical career ==
=== Breakthrough and success ===
Karki began his professional music career in the early 1990s.His breakthrough came with the song "Jiwan ma Khola Tarnu chha," which became an instant hit and established him as a prominent voice in the Nepali music industry.

=== Playback singing ===
Karki has lent his voice to numerous Nepali films as a playback singer.He has received several awards for his playback work in the Nepali film industry.

=== International recognition ===
In 1999, Karki gained international exposure by winning the International Saregama Antakshari competition held in London. He has performed in numerous countries including Malaysia, bringing Nepali music to global audiences.

== Notable songs ==
· "Jiwan ma Khola Tarnu chha" · "Maya Ko Dori" · "Phool Ko Aankha Ma" · "Samjhana Birseko"

== Awards and recognition ==
Throughout his career, Ananda Karki has received numerous awards and honors for his contributions to Nepali music:

· Chinnalata Award (Pratibha Puraskar) - 1997 & 2009 · International Saregama Antakshari, London - 1999 · Master Awards - 2000 · Various playback singing awards for Nepali films
