= Sanjit Bhandari =

Nepali Actor

- सञ्जीत भण्डारी
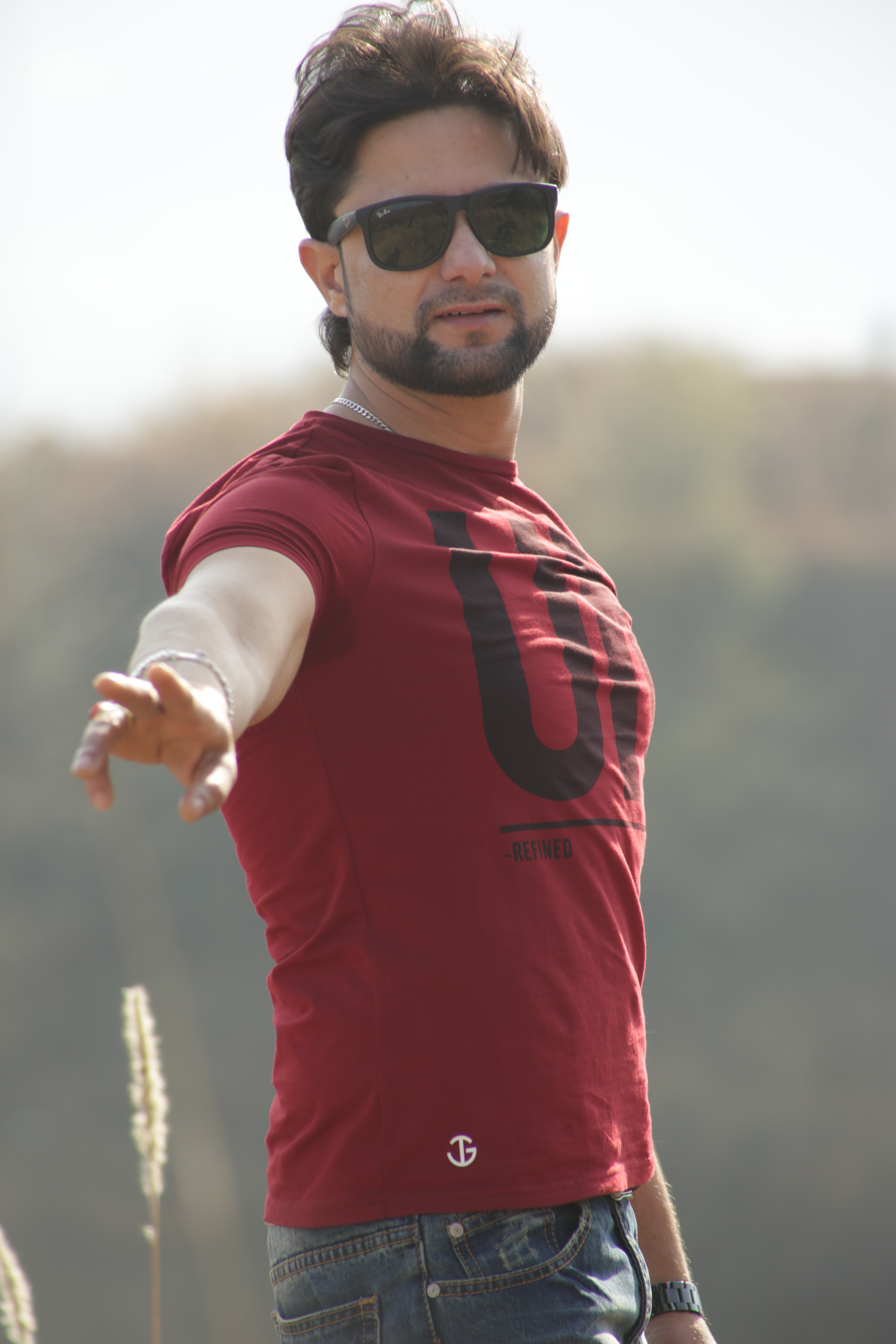
- Born: 27 July; Nawalparasi, Nepal
- Citizenship: Nepalese
- Occupations: Actor and Model
- Years active: 2000AD - present
- Organization(s): Intra National welfare&Support Foundation of America(Nepal), Sejal&Sister Foundation
- Known for: Lamphoo
- Parents: Durga Datta Bhandari (father); Kamakhya Bhandari (mother)
- Awards: Spiny Babbler International Film Festival Award 2021AD, Pim Nepal 2019 AD

Sanjit Bhandari (Nepali: सञ्जीत भण्डारी) is a Nepali actor from the Nawalparasi district of Nepal, known from Nepali Movie "Lamphoo." He was born on 27 July. He started his acting journey with television serial "Thorai Vaya Pugisari" in 2000 AD.

== About ==
Bhandari made his debut in the film industry in 2018 AD with the movie "Lamphoo" . "Chithi" and "Adhithupan" are some notable movie on his acting crareer. He has been awarded from different national and international awards like Spiny Babbler International Film Festival Award and Star International Award. In addition to his acting career, he has modeling on music videos. "Sahar," "Sathi," and "Jun Din Malai" are some popular music video on his modeling career. His modeling journey start from 2002 AD.

== Filmography ==
=== Films ===
SN	Movie name	Release date	Credit	ref
1	Lamphoo	2018	Lead Actor	
2	Chitti	2022	Lead Actor	
3	Adhuthupan - 2	2020	Lead Actor	
4	Andhapath	upcoming		
5	Kina Lagchha Maya			

=== Music videos ===
SN	Name	Credit	ref
1	Nata Maile		
2	Jun Din Malai	Model	
3	Sahar	Model	
4	Sathi	Model	
5	Aau na Aau	Model	
6	Maya Chharera	Model	
7	Pachhyauri Ko Farko	Model	
8	Khadka Ji Ki Chhori		

== Awards ==
SN	Award title	Award Category	Result	Ref
1	Galaxy Excellence Award 2020	Best Modal	Won	
2	PIM Film Festival 2019	Best Actor- Movie lamphoo	Won	
3	Spiny Babbler International Film Festival Award 2021	Best Actor- Movie lamphoo	Won	
4	Star International Award Qatar 2019	Best Actor- Movie lamphoo	Won	
5	International Achievement Award 2024 AD	Best Model	Won	
