= Sony Rana =

Nepal's first commercial woman pilot

Captain Sony Rana
- सोनी राणा
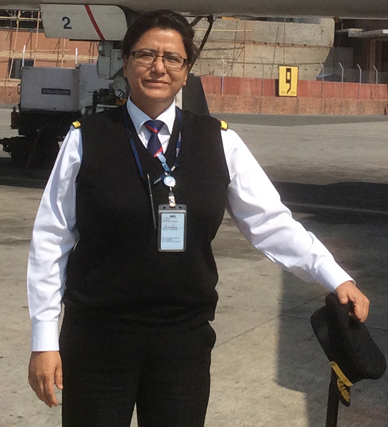
- Rana at Tribhuvan International Airport (2016)
- Born: 17 October 1965 (age 61); Kathmandu, Nepal
- Other name: Sonee Rana
- Occupation: Pilot
- Years active: 1991–present
- Employer: Nepal Airlines
- Known for: Nepal's first woman pilot (1991)
- Spouse: Bijay Giri
- Children: 1
- Parents: Om Narsingha Rana (father); Kanchan Rana (mother)
- Awards: Order of Gorkha Dakshina Bahu (Fourth Class)
- Website: Official website

Sony Rana (Nepali: सोनी राणा or Sonee Rana; born 17 October 1965) is Nepal's first woman pilot. She obtained her aviation license from Civil Aviation Authority of Nepal on 29 March 1991 under license number 119. She is also the first Nepali female pilot of the Boeing jet.

== Early life and education ==
Rana was born on 17 October 1965 (2022 BS) on the day of Laxmi Puja to father Om Narsingha Rana and mother Kanchan Rana in Thamel, Kathmandu. She completed her SLC-level education from Mahendra Bhawan School and received her Certificate degree and Diploma from Padma Kanya Multiple Campus. She then went to the United States in 1987 to obtain training in aviation.

== Aviation career ==
She registered with CAAN on 20 March 1991 (26 Kartik 2047 BS). After two years of the completion of her pilot training, she started working in the-then Royal Nepal Airlines Corporation (RNAC). RNAC had opened a vacancy for three pilots and 10 pilots had applied. She and Rakshya Rana were the only two female applicants. Among the 10, Sony Rana was selected and then she started working for RNAC, becoming the first commercial Nepali female pilot. She started as a Trainee Co-Pilot on 12 November 1990, became a Junior Co-pilot on 31 March 1991 and became a Senior Co-Pilot on 14 July 1992.

She received her Boeing license on 23 November 2005 from Civil Aviation Department of CAAN and started working as B 757 Co-Pilot since 23 December 2005.

== Award ==
Rana was awarded with Order of Gorkha Dakshina Bahu (Fourth Class) in 1993.

== Personal life ==
She married Bijay Giri, a fellow pilot in 2055 BS (1998–1999), after seven years of acquittance. Giri died on a plane crash in Surkhet on 17 July 2002 (1 Shrawan 2059). She has one daughter. Her younger brother Ashish Narasingh Rana is also a pilot. She currently lives in Maharajgunj, Kathmandu.

== Contest over the 'First Nepali woman pilot' title ==
Although Rana received her license on 29 March 1991, Rakshya Rana is popularly known as the first Nepali woman pilot. Rakshya Rana received her license on 20 May 1992. According to the Pilot Safety Department Head of CAAN, Raju Shrestha, Sony Rana is the first female Nepali pilot with a Nepali aviation license. The CAAN also published a statement on 22 May 2016 declaring Sony Rana as the first Nepali woman pilot to hold the Nepalese civilian license.
