= Manoj Katuwal =

Nepalese cricketer (born 1985)

Personal information
- Born: 14 March 1985 (age 41); Nepal
- Batting: Right-handed
- Role: Wicket-keeper

Career statistics
Competition	First-class
Matches	2
Runs scored	40
Batting average	20.00
100s/50s	0/0
Top score	24
Catches/stumpings	3/0
- Source: CricketArchive, 29 March 2008

Manoj Katuwal (born 14 March 1985) is a Nepalese cricketer. A right-handed batsman and wicket-keeper, he played for the Nepal national cricket team between 2002 and 2006 including two first-class matches.

== Biography ==
Born in Nepal in 1985, Manoj Katuwal first played for Nepal at Under-17 level when he played in the ACC Under-17 Asia Cup in Bangladesh in 2001. He played for Nepal Under-19s at the Under-19 World Cup in New Zealand the subsequent year and made his début for the senior team later that year in the ACC Trophy in Singapore.

Returning to the Under-19 team, he played in the 2003 Youth Asia Cup in Karachi and a second Under-19 World Cup, in Bangladesh in 2004. Following the Under-19 World Cup, he made his first-class début, playing for Nepal in the 2004 ICC Intercontinental Cup against the UAE and Malaysia. He played ACC Fast Track Countries Tournament matches against Singapore, the UAE and Hong Kong later that year.

His appearances for the Nepalese team became less frequent at this point in his career. He played an ACC Fast Track Countries Tournament match against Malaysia in October 2005, before playing a match against Namibia in Windhoek to decide the final team in the 2006 ICC Intercontinental Cup. Nepal had to win the match outright to qualify for the main tournament, but the match ended in a draw. He most recently played for his country in the ACC Premier League in 2006, when he played against the UAE.
