= Sita KC =

Nepalese singer (born 1990)

Sita KC सिता के सी
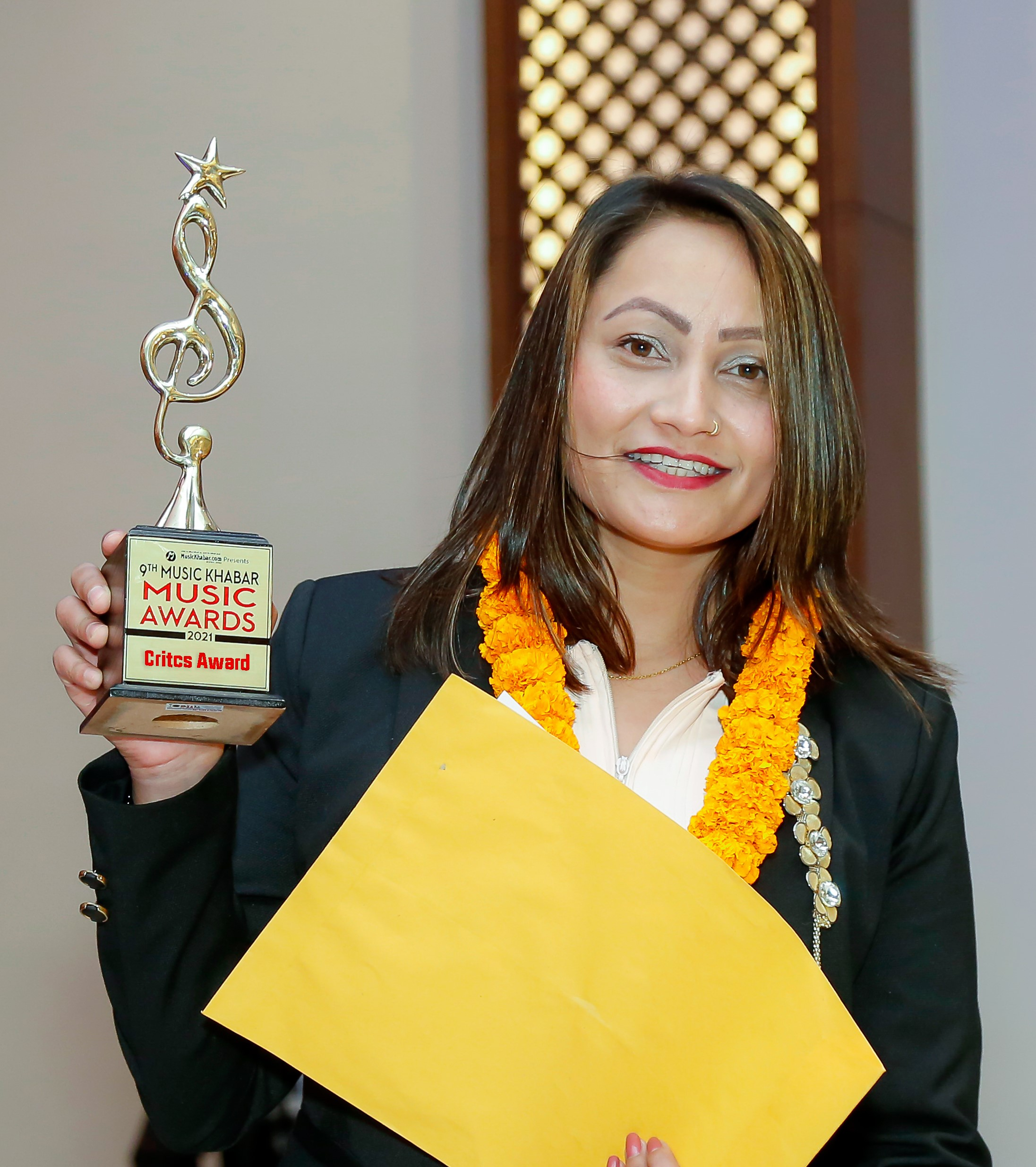

Background information
- Born: 22 March 1990 (age 36); Galkot-04, Baglung
- Occupations: Singer
- Years active: 2064 (BS)/2008 AD-present

Sita KC (Nepali: सिता के सी) was born on 22 March 1990 is a Nepali singer from Baglung, Nepal. She has published more than 150 songs until now.

Born in Galkot, Baglung, KC, her family was musical. Her father, mother and brother are all active in this field. Sometimes she sings, sometimes dances and sometimes she models. "I grew up singing dohri with family since childhood." Her parents had a dream that her daughter might achieve success in the field of music. "I started learning classical music from Deepak Jangam. The same year I came to Kathmandu, lent her voice to a song composed by Madhav Bhandari, titled 'Jyan Tadha Hunda Samjhana Aaune'. With this song, I stepped into the field of Nepali folk songs. I have spent a decade and a half in this field, sometimes singing songs in folk & duet song evenings, sometimes releasing albums, sometimes singing other people's songs. More than two hundred songs have been released in my voice. I have also lent my voice in songs of various styles including folk song, dohori, kauda, jhyaure. I passed the vocal exam in Radio Nepal in 2064. Some of the songs in my voice are Chhalchhal Pani Gagrima, Piratiko Dori, Sunko Bala, Jindagi Bhar Bhayo, Bhagyale ni Dhatyo, Bhagawan, Godhuli Sanjhaima and others. I have also lent my voice in a folk fusion song in collaboration with Mr. RJ, Almora."

== About and career ==
Sita KC is a Nepali singer from Baglung, Nepal. She started her singing career with 'malai America yei'. This song was very popular in Nepal. Chhalchhal Pani Gagrima, Piratiko Dori, and Yo Dashain Tiharma are some popular songs of hers. She is actively involved music industry from 2064 BS/2008 AD until now. She was awarded an Image Award and a National Music Awards.

== Awards ==
SN	Award name	Song name	Result
1	16 Image Award 2071	Best Singer (Malai America Yahi -Folk & Duet Songs)	Winner
2	3rd National Folk & Duet Song Award 2071	Best Singer (Malai America Yahi -Folk & Duet Songs)	Winner
3	Chhinnalata Prize Award 2071	Best Singer (Malai America Yahi -Folk & Duet Songs)	Winner
4	Nepali Arts, Culture & Music Award 2077	Best Singer (Godhuli Sanjhaima-Folk & Duet Songs)	Winner
5	7th National Capital Award 2077	Best Singer (Bhagyale Ni Dhatyo -Folk & Duet Songs)	Winner
6	9th Music Khabar Music Award 2021 (Folk Song)	Critics Award (Sunka Bala)	Winner
7	10th Chhayanchhabi Teej Music Award 2080	Best Original Teej Singer (Hera ta Sailee)	Winner
