= Parvati Thapa =

Nepalese sports shooter

Parvati Thapa (sometimes spelled Parbati Thapa) (born 1970) is a Nepalese sports shooter who participated in the Women's 10 metre air rifle event at the 1988 Summer Olympics held in Seol, South Korea. She was the first woman to represent Nepal at the Olympics.

== Early life ==
Thapa was born in 1970 in Nepalgunj. She took up shooting after her elder brother Laxman Thapa, himself a sport shooter insisted. Her younger brother has also competed at national-level shooting championships organised in Nepal.

== Career ==
Thapa was a finalist at the 1987 Asian Shooting Championships in Beijing, obtaining 96.5 points and finishing in the sixth position. This led to her being chosen to represent Nepal at the 1988 Summer Olympics held in Seol. In the qualifier for the Women's 10 metre air rifle event, she scored 375 points and tied with Fabienne Diato-Pasetti of Monaco for the 43rd position. Thapa did not qualify for the final round. She won a silver medal at the 1991 South Asian Games, Colombo. She has also participated in five shooting World Cups and at national level, has 16 gold, six silver and one bronze medal to her credit. Later Thapa became an instructor.
