= Roshan Thapa =

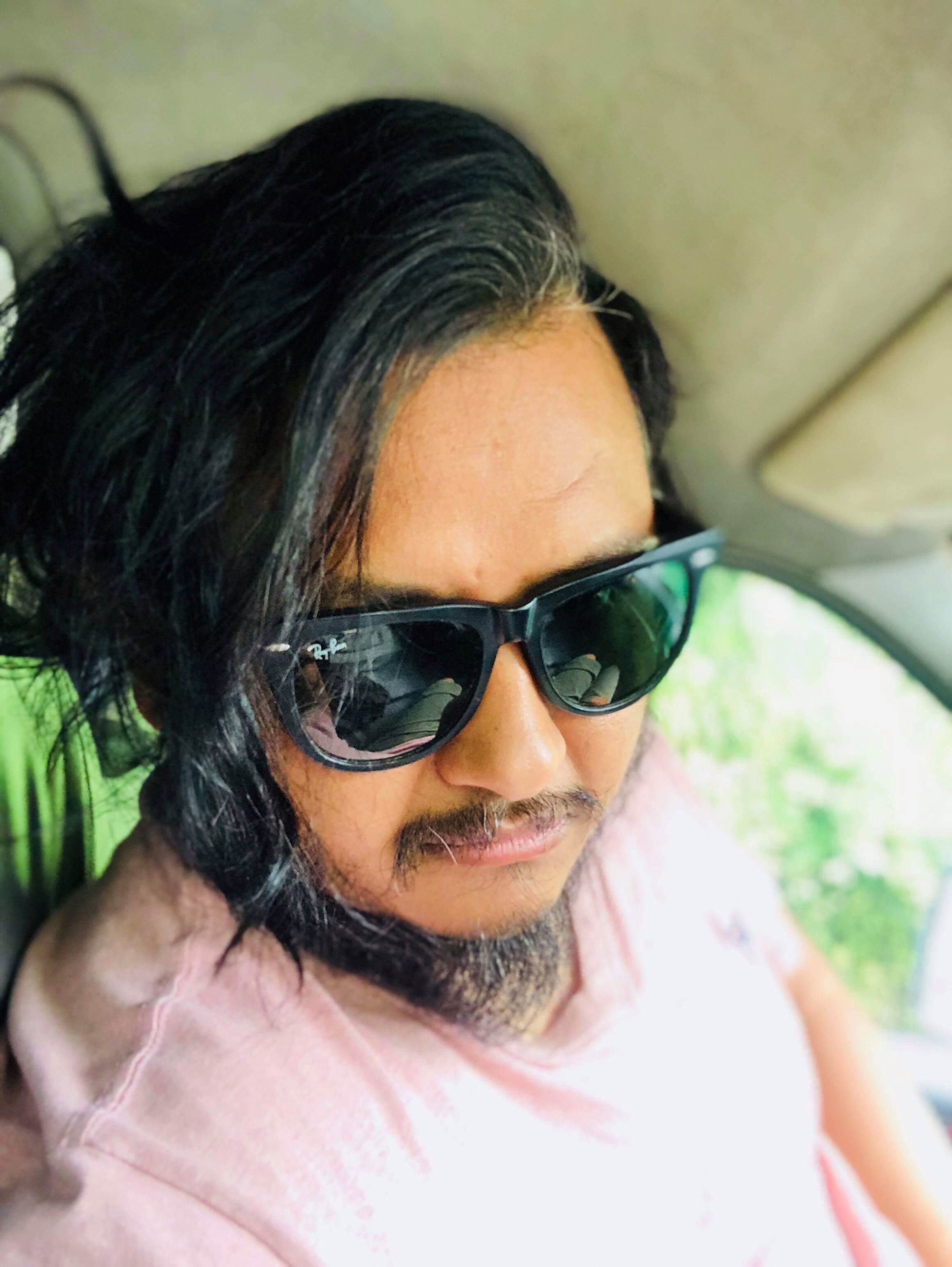
- Roshan Thapa
- Born: Roshan Thapa; Nepal
- Status: Single
- Occupations: Singer, Lyricist, Music Director

Roshan Thapa is a singer and music director (composer) in the Nepali music industry. He is known for his work on his first movie, Loot. The item song 'Udhreko choli' was famous at the time. Another song of the movie, 'Mera ti khushi haru', was nominated for Best movie song at the Image Music Awards of 2012.

== Productions ==
=== Director ===
- Udhareko Choli - feature song
- Mera Ti Khushi Haru... - feature song
- Bhagera Janchas Kaha - feature song
- Talkyo Jawani - feature song
- Note Note - feature song
- jawani
- chatta rumal
- Paanpatey saila dai

=== Movie Music Composes ===
- Loot - Nepali
- Loot 2 - Nepali
- Saadhe 7 - Nepali
- Jatra - Nepali
- chachahui - Nepali
- 2 Rupiya
