= Ram Thapa =

Ram Thapa राम थापा
- Born: 18 August 1958 (2nd Bhadra 2015 BS); Kamal Pokhari, Kathmandu
- Died: 20 November 2008 (month of Agrahayana 2065 BS) Kathmandu, Nepal
- Genres: folk

Ram Thapa (राम थापा) was a folk singer and musician of Nepal. He was born on 18 August 1958 in Kamal Pokhari, Kathmandu and he died on 20 November 2008 due to liver disease at the Norvic hospital.

Thapa started singing in 1974. He worked as a music director (Sangeet Nirdeshak, 7th Grade Staff) in Radio Nepal. He sang more than 150 folk songs and directed more than 200 songs. He was the first person to publish music books of lyrics and chords in Nepal and considered as chief contributor to teach music to the aspiring Nepali musicians. At the ending date of his life, he acted as a judge in Nepali Tara I & II, a TV program. Thapa is also known for his humorous folk songs. His song Reetu Haruma Timi was selected as the 7th best by BBC in 2003.

== Personal life ==
Ram Thapa was born to father Hastabahadur Thapa (हस्तबहादुर थापा) and mother Hirakumari Thapa (हीराकुमारी थापा). He started singing when he was in school. He passed the SLC exam in 1972 at the age of 14 from Yuwak Ma. Vi, Paknajol. In 1974, he passed a voice test from Radio Nepal. His first recorded song was Hai Hai Bankali Mai (हाई हाई वनकाली माई). He is married to Rajani Thapa.

== Books ==
Thapa is famous for the first books on playing guitar in Nepal. He published a total of 10 books on the subject.

- Guitar Chords Anthology (Guitar Guide), Part – 1, 2, 3 and 4
- Song and Chords Anthology, Part- 1, 2 and 3
- New Guitar Guide (ISBN 9789937330961, 9789993301820)
- Pop song and Chords Anthology
- Staff Notation Gyan (ISBN 9993301337)

== Prizes and medals ==
Thapa received following awards:

- Nationwide Folk Song Competition (2036 BS; 1979 AD) Second Position
- Nationwide Modern Song Competition (2040 BS; 1983 AD) First Prize
- Nationwide Modern Song Competition (2043 BS; 1986 AD) First Prize
- Narayan Gopal Youth Music Puraskar, (shared with Tara Thapa) (2050 BS; 1993 AD)
- Shri 5 Birandra Gaddi Aarohan Rajat Padak, (2053 BS; 1996 AD)
- Shri 5 Birendra Aishworya Sewa Padak (2058 BS; 2001 AD)
- Chhinnalata Puraskar (2059 BS; 2002 AD)
- Letter of appreciation from the late King Birendra Bikram Shah for teaching music to the late Prince Dipendra (2044 BS; 1987 AD).
- Felicitated by Gorkha Victoria Cross Reception Committee (2050 BS; 1993 AD)
- Rastriya Gaurab Yuva Samman (2054 BS; 1997 AD)
- Nai Kala Nidhi Yuva Samman (2056 BS; 1999 AD)
- Nepal Deshbhakta Kalakar Sangh Samman (2056 BS; 1999 AD)
- Arun Memorial Music Award (2065 BS; 2008 AD)

== Music ==
Ram Thapa published 42 albums.

=== Dohori and Folk song’s albums ===
- Ram Thapa ka Lok Geet, Part -1 and 2
- Sero phero Salaam chha Mero (Dohori)
- Arya Bhanjyang (Dohori)
- Lok Suseli
- Chautari ma Bar
- Chha Macchi Jalaima
- Khola paari Bajyo Murali
- Majhi ra Machhi (Dohari)
- Sali Bhena (Dohari)
- Kina Lajaki?
- Pothi Banseko
- Laali Rangle
- Chaubandi Kalle Siyeko
- Milau Dahine Haat

=== Modern song albums ===
- Ram Thapaka Sangeetka Aadhunik Geetharu, Part – 1 and 2
- Maun Prem
- Yek Mutu Anek Dhukdhuki
- Sargam Saugat
- Aaja Bholi

=== Jesting (Hasya Byenga) songs albums ===
- Sandheko Judhai Bachchhako Michai
- Khichatani
- Sriman Shrimati
- Mattitelko Kyu
- Dhatterika
- Gai Jattrai Gai Jattra
- Nepal Bandh
- Nepalai Nepal
- Bina Junge Sher
- Gau Gaubata Utha
- Katar katarma

=== Films/Movies ===
- Baadal
- Gham Chhaya
- Aakha Lobhi Mann Paapi

=== CD albums ===
- Hit Creation of Ram Thapa (Modern)
- Thok na Maadal Thok (Folk)
