= Yogi Naraharinath =

Nepali historian, writer and saint of Nath tradition of Gorakhnath

Rastra Guru Yogi Naraharinath
- योगी नरहरिनाथ
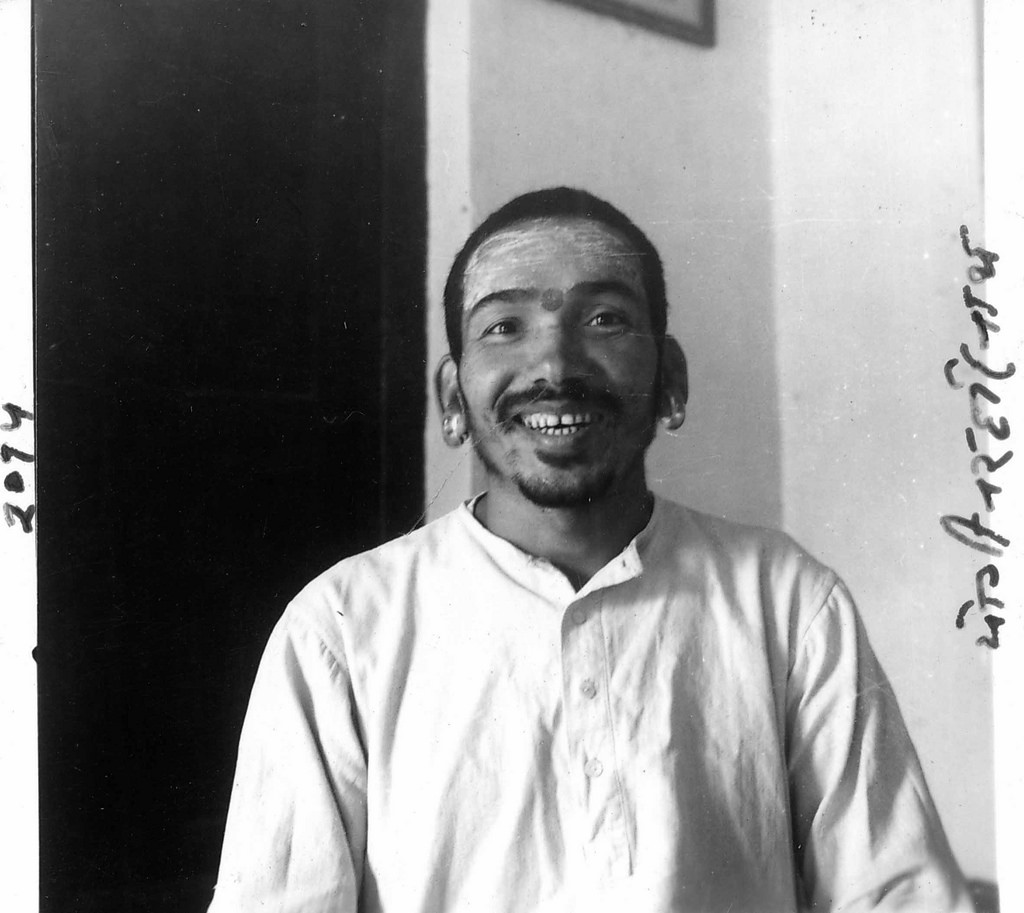
- Yogi Naraharinath at 2015 B.S. (1958/1959 AD)

Personal life
- Born: Balbir Singh Riksen Thapa; 1915 Kalikot District
- Died: 2003 Mrigasthali, Kathmandu
- Known for: Historian, writer and Hindu religious figure
- Other name: Walking Pashupatinath

Religious life
- Religion: Hinduism
- Denomination: Nath tradition
- Dharma name: Yogi Naraharinath

Yogi Naraharinath (born: Balbir Singh Hriksen Thapa, 1915–2003 CE) was a Nepali historian, writer and follower of the Nath tradition of Gorakhnath.

== Early life ==
Balbir Singh Hriksen Thapa was born on 28 February 1915 (Bikram Samvat: 17th Falgun 1971) in Kalikot District (now located in Karnali Province) to father Lalit Singh Hriksen Thapa and mother Gauri Devi as their second child. He belonged to Khas clan of Hriksen Thapa Chhetri who falls in Bhardwaj Gotra of Hinduism. Naraharinath took his Upanayana ceremony at the age of eight. He later took Sannyasa (life of renunciation) in the Chandannath Temple, Jumla District, where his guru named him Yogi Naraharinath.

At the age of nine, he was enrolled into the Vatukbhairavanath Siddha Chandannath Bhasha Pathshala in Jumla, and later he migrated to India aged eight and learned Sanskrit language. He later became noted historian and saint of Gorakhnath tradition and resided at Mrigasthali, Kathmandu near the holy temple of Pashupatinath.

== Writing career ==
He has written over 570 books of which 114 were published. His works includes collection and decryption of documents Khas language (ancient Nepali language) to readable Nepali which mostly included genealogies. According to Devmala Bansawali, he produced some claims regarding Victorian King Vikramaditya. He has also provided contributions to Nepal Sanskrit University at Dang. He was jailed for his political views on strong Hinduistic country and calling then ruling monarchy as weak. He also sent letter in Sanskrit language to Indian prime minister Atal Behari Vajpayee requesting India to be declared a Hindu nation. He also believed liberty of religion and opposed non-allowance of non-Hindus at Pashupatinath Temple. He called the lord of the temple being common to all religions. He was also nicknamed Walking Pashupatinath by Swami Karpatri.

== Death ==
He died aged 88 on 13th Falgun, 2059 B.S. at Gorakhnath premise of Mrigasthali, Kathmandu.
