= Tirtha Kumari Thapa =

Nepalese singer

- Thapa in 2025 (Photo: Suraj Kumar Thapa)

Background information
- Origin: Kathmandu, Nepal
- Genre: Nepalese Folk Music
- Spouse: Prem Bahadur Thapa
- Award: Prabal Gorkha Dakshin Bahu - 2057 (2000)

Tirtha Kumari Thapa is a Nepalese folk singer known for her contributions to Nepali folk and traditional music. Beginning her recording career with Radio Nepal in 1971, she has recorded more than 1,000 songs in Nepali and Newar. Her notable recordings include "Ma Ta Khadina Kuwako Pani", "Dhunge Bagara Maya", "Jhamke Fuli Nakai Ma Bulaki", "Ukalima Pani Hajur Motor Jado Raichha", and "Machhi Marana Hai Dai Ho".

== Early life and career ==
Thapa grew up in a family with a musical background. Her grandfather led a devotional singing group, her father played the flute, and other members of her family, including her mother and aunts, were involved in singing. During her childhood, she listened to recordings of Nepalese singers including Tara Devi, Narayan Gopal, Bachchu Kailash, Prem Dhoj Pradhan, and Aruna Lama.

Before establishing her musical career, Thapa worked in the Nepalese civil service. She was employed in the Ministry of Land Reform and subsequently worked in the postal service and the Ministry of Communications.

== Selected Songs ==
- "Ma Ta Khadina Kuwako Pani"
- "Chari Bani Udunlaa"
- "Dhunge Bagara Maya"
- "Jhamke Fuli Nakai Ma Bulaki"
- "Ukalima Pani Hajur Motor Jado Raichha"
- "Machhi Marana Hai Dai Ho"
- "Bariko Dilma Okharbot"
- "Danda Mathi Bihanai"
- "Kati Sarai Jameko Pirati"
- "Kahile Ma Hune Hola Nani"
- "Dai Kahanko"

== Awards ==
Year	Award	Organization
2000	Prabal Gorkha Dakshin Bahu - 2057	Royal Government of Nepal
2001	Birendra Aishwarya Sewa Padak - 2058	Royal Government of Nepal
2017	Regional Prativa Award	Ministry of Culture, Tourism and Civil Aviation
2023	Music Khabar Dedication Award-2079	Media Center
2023	Sagarmatha Lifetime Achievement Award - 2080	Sahara Group

== Personal Life ==
She is married to Prem Bahadur Thapa. Her son, Suraj Kumar Thapa is also a musician. He remade her popular song "Ma Ta Khadina Kuwako Pani" in 2023.
