= Mamata Thapa =

Nepalese cricketer

Personal information
- Born: 13 September 1991 (age 35); Nepal
- Batting: Right-handed
- Role: Wicket-keeper

International information
- National side: Nepal
- T20I debut (cap 10): 17 November 2010 v Japan
- Last T20I: 24 September 2014 v Bangladesh

Mamata Thapa (Nepali: ममता थापा; born 13 September 1991) is a Nepalese wicket-keeper and right-handed batter woman of Nepali National Cricket team.
