= Ram Pratap Thapa =

- माननीय श्री राम प्रताप थापा
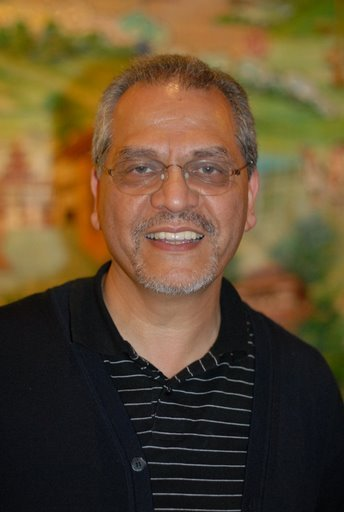
- Consul General Ram Pratap Thapa

Honorary Consul General at Cologne, Germany

Personal details
- Born: June 6, 1950 (age 76) Gorkha district, Nepal
- Education: Tribhuwan University
- Awards: Order of Gorkha Dakshina Bahu
- Website: www.ramthapa.com

Ram Pratap Thapa OGDB (Nepali: राम प्रताप थापा transliteration: Rām Pratāp Thāpā) is an Honorary Consul General to Germany at Cologne and chairman of German-Nepalese society. He is also the founding member of Non Resident Nepali Association (NRNA) serving Nepalese Diaspora.

== Involvements ==
Thapa has been member of German Nepalese society in Cologne since 1988. He was elected chairman of the association in 1999. He began initiatives like annual Nepal day, NGO-Forum Nepal and annual meeting of German Nepal NGOs. Thapa is founding member of Diaspora Organisation Non-Resident Nepali Association (NRNA). He spent two years as member of International Coordination Council of NRNA and was elected Vice President of Europe Region. He is now official patron of NRNA.

Thapa is involved in many organizations' in Germany. He is a board member of Asian Foundation in Essen. He established German Committee of National Trust for Nature Conservation along with Gunther Nogge.

He has been emphasizing Dual Citizenship for Nepalese diaspora and is task coordinator of NRN-Task Force Dual Citizenship.

== Awards ==
- In 1999, Thapa was awarded Order of Gorkha Dakshina Bahu by King Birendra of Nepal.
- In 2001, Thapa was awarded Federal Service Cross for establishing understanding between Germany and Nepal.
