= Sharmila Thapa =

Nepali activist working for single mothers and against domestic violence

Sharmila Thapa is a Nepali nurse and activist working for single mothers and against domestic violence.

== Career and activism ==
Thapa is an activist who speaks out against gender based violence, something she experienced herself prior to her divorce.

She was awarded the N-Peace Awards by UNDP in 2015. She also founded Samida Women Development Forum, an organization working for single mothers. The forum has provided scholarships for 86 children of single mothers from various part of Nepal.

She is a nurse.

== Awards ==
- N-Peace Awards by UNDP in 2015

== Selected publications ==
- Sharmila, T; Power on paper: Women should be made part of all decision-making bodies to uproot patriarchy (2015) The Katmandu Post.

== Family life ==
Thapa herself is a single mother of a son and an adopted daughter.
