= Rabi Thapa =

Nepalese English author

- रवि थापा
- Education: University of Cambridge (M.Phil.), Monash University (B.A.)
- Occupation: Writer/Editor
- Notable work: Nothing to Declare (2011); Thamel: Dark Star of Kathmandu (2016)
- Website: rabi-thapa.com

Rabi Thapa (Nepali: रवि थापा) is a Nepali writer and editor working in English. He is the editor of La.Lit: A Literary Magazine from Nepal, and the author of Nothing to Declare (Penguin India, 2011) and Thamel: Dark Star of Kathmandu (Speaking Tiger, 2016). From 2010 to 2011, he was the editor of the weekly paper Nepali Times.

== Background ==
Rabi Thapa published Nothing to Declare (Penguin India) in 2011. This debut collection of short stories was longlisted for the Frank O’Connor International Short Story Award. The following year, Thapa co-founded the literary magazine La.Lit, and is an editor of the magazine as well. In 2016, he published Thamel: Dark Star of Kathmandu (Speaking Tiger Books), a cultural history of a historic Kathmandu neighborhood.

== See also ==
- Manjushree Thapa
- Samrat Upadhyay
