= Topi (disambiguation) =

A topi is an antelope species of the genus Damaliscus. The word is used for the species D. lunatus in general, but has also been restricted to D. lunatus jimela. The subspecies D. lunatus topi is also called topi.

Topi may also refer to:

== Headwear ==
- Dhaka topi or Nepali topi, a style of hat that is part of the Nepali national dress
- Bhaad-gaaule, part of Newari traditional dress, and an alternative to the Dhaka topi
- Taqiyah (cap), a short, rounded cap worn by Muslim men, called "topi" in the Indian subcontinent
- Gandhi cap or Gandhi topi, a white topi worn in India and having political significance
- Pith helmet or topi, a lightweight helmet made of cork or pith with a cloth cover
- Sindhi topi, a style of hat worn in Sindh
- Birke topi, a traditional cap worn in the western hilly region of Nepal
- Himachali cap or Pahari topi, a hat worn in Himachal Pradesh
- the Indian Topi or Topi, the word used in the Indian subcontinent for a Kufi, a short, rounded cap
- Rumi topi, the word used in the Indian subcontinent for a Fez, a flat, felt cap

== People ==
- Bamir Topi (born 1957), former President of the Republic of Albania
- Teuta Topi (born 1962), former first lady of Albania
- Topi Ala (born 2006), Finnish footballer
- Topi Helin (born 1978), Finnish professional Thai boxer
- Topi Järvinen (born 1994), Finnish footballer
- Topi Keskinen (born 2003), Finnish footballer
- Topi Mattila (born 1946), Finnish ski jumper
- Topi Niemelä (born 2002), Finnish ice hockey defenceman
- Topi Raitanen (born 1996), Finnish runner
- Topi Sarparanta (born 1975), Finnish Nordic combined skier
- Topi Sorsakoski (1952–2011), Finnish singer

== Other uses ==
- Topi, Khyber Pakhtunkhwa, Swabi District, Khyber Pakhtunkhwa, Pakistan
- Topi Drama, a Pakistani rock band
- Topi Tehsil, Swabi, Khyber Pakhtunkhwa, Pakistan
