= Shyade =

Traditional cap of Tamang people

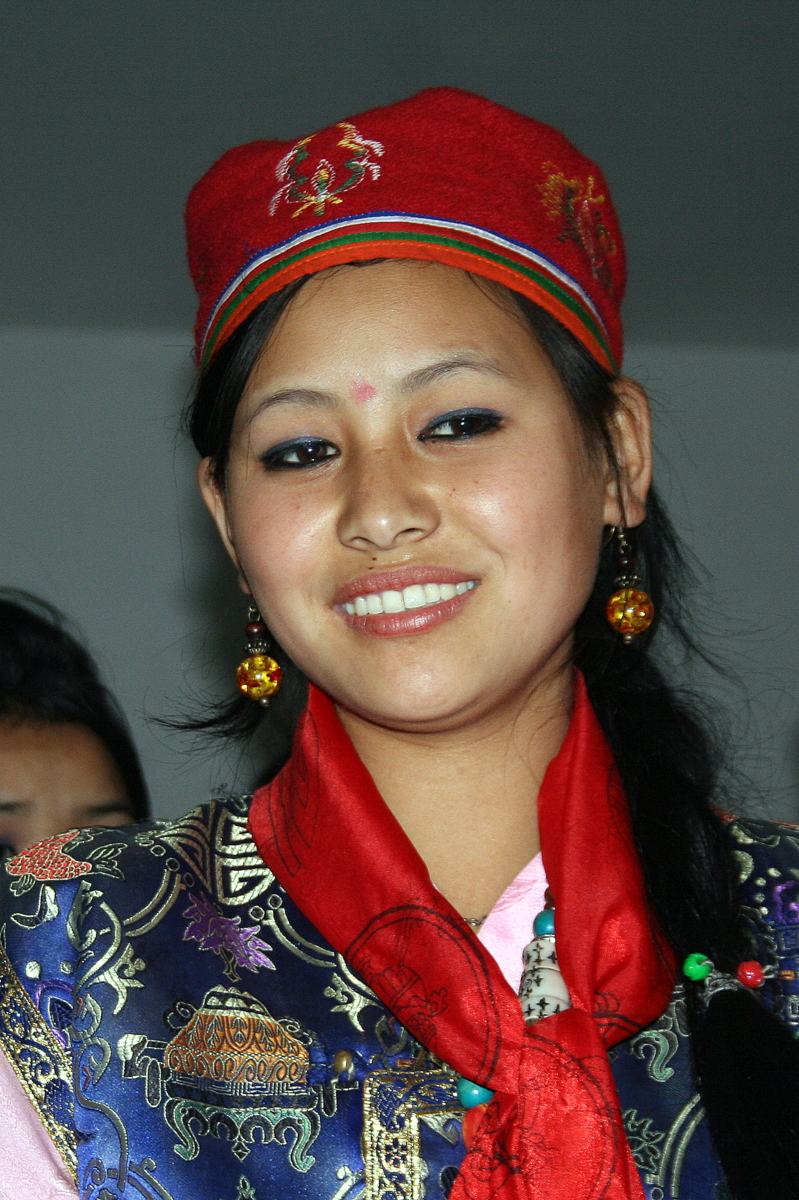
- A Tamang woman wearing a Shyade cap
- Type: Cap
- Material: Wool
- Place of origin: Nepal

Shyade (Nepali: श्यादे) or Tamang Tagi (Nepali: तामाङ तागी) is a woolen cap worn by the Tamang people of Nepal. It is a part of the traditional dress of the community. The hat is unisex and is worn by people of all age groups.

== Material ==
The cap is usually made of wool, and the shape is typically round and flat at the top. The hat has colorful stripes on the edge and it resembles a hat without the brim. It has various embroideries around the circular part as well as the top. Various religious Buddhist symbols such as Vajra or Endless knot are embraided on the cap.

== Usage ==
The cap is mostly worn during various social gatherings, festivals such as Sonam Lhosar, and religious and cultural ceremonies. The cap has also become a symbol of the identity of Tamang people in Nepal, where Dhaka topi usually overshadows other traditional headgears.

== Gallery ==
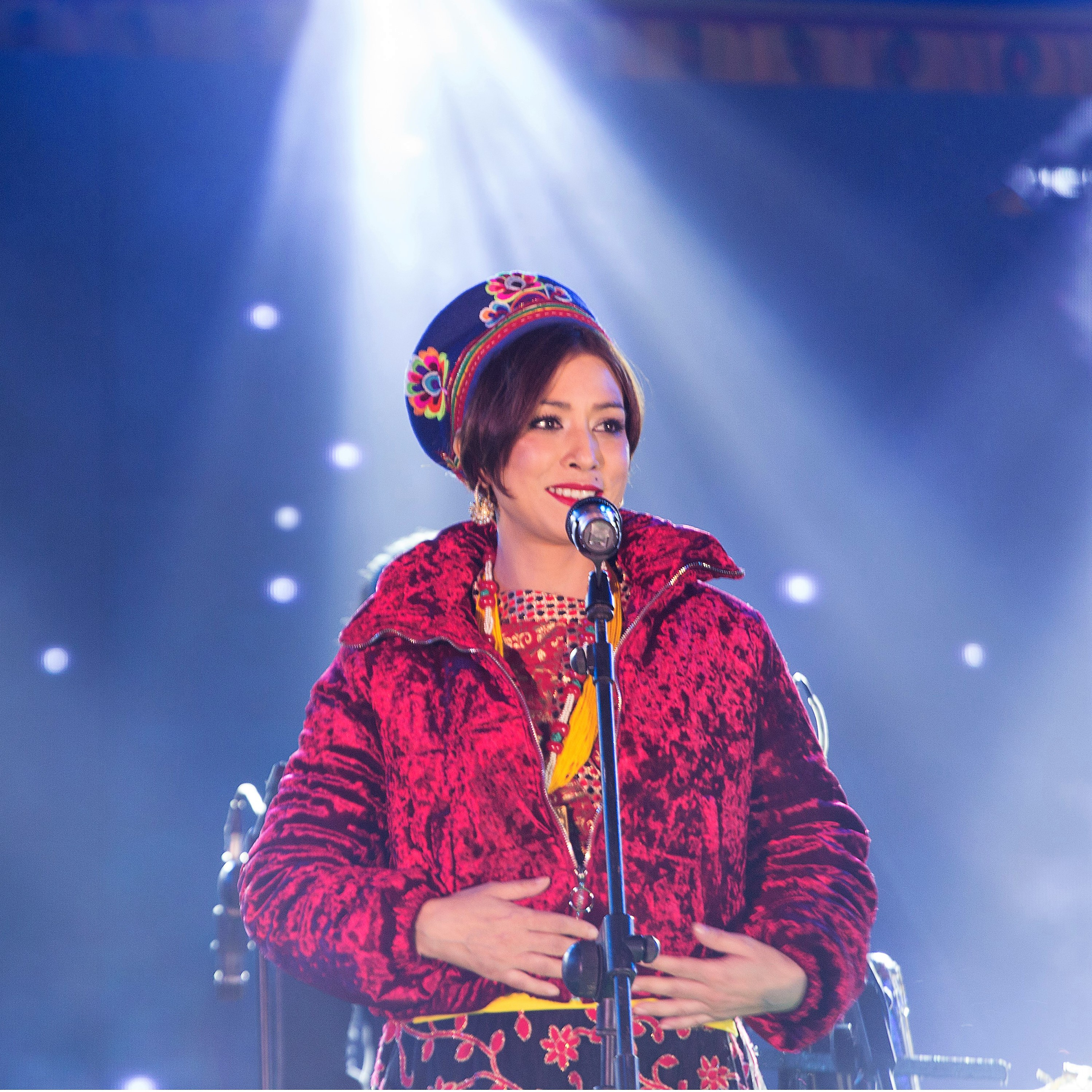
Singer Navneet Aditya Waiba in Shyade

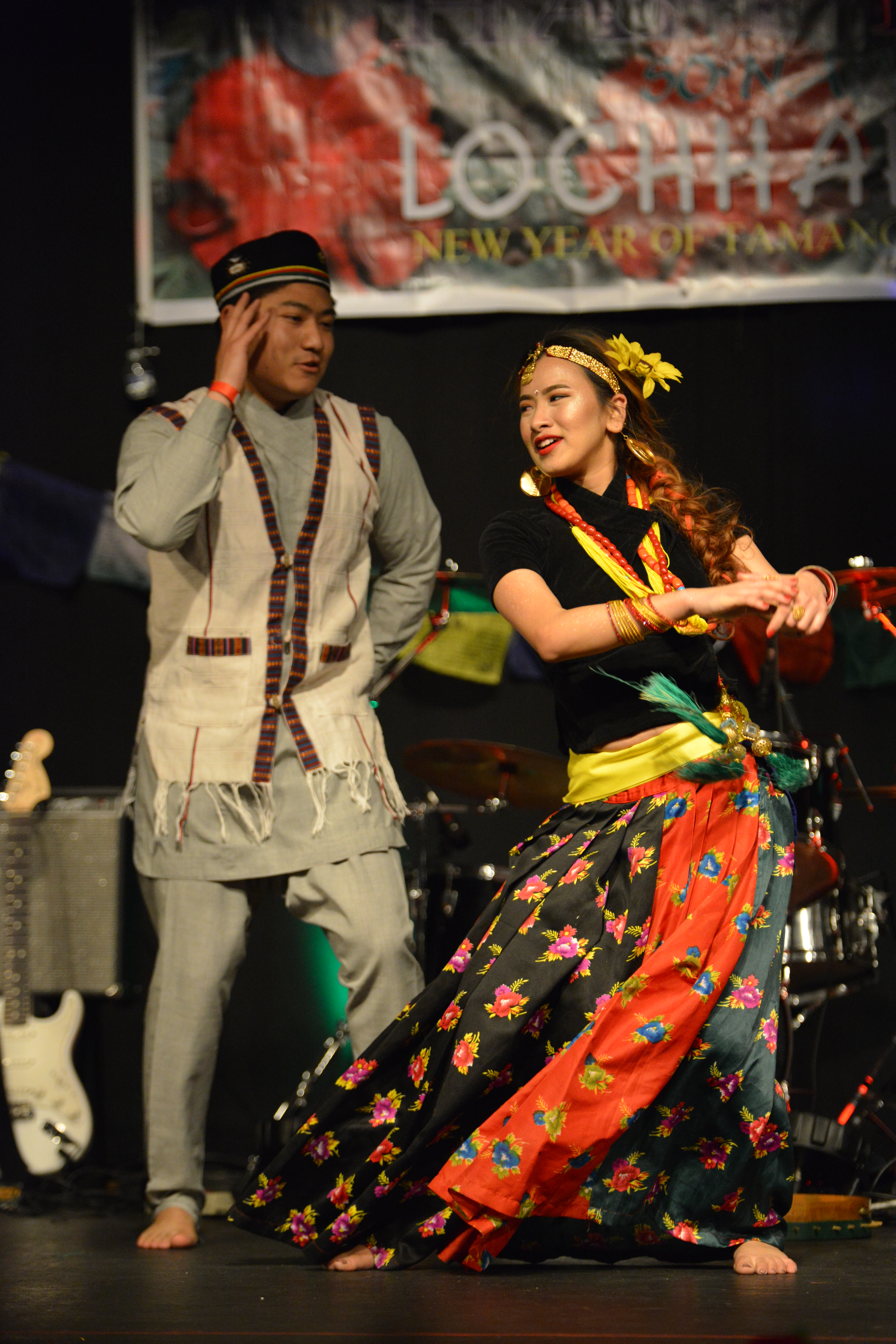
A guy in Tamang attire performing cultural dance

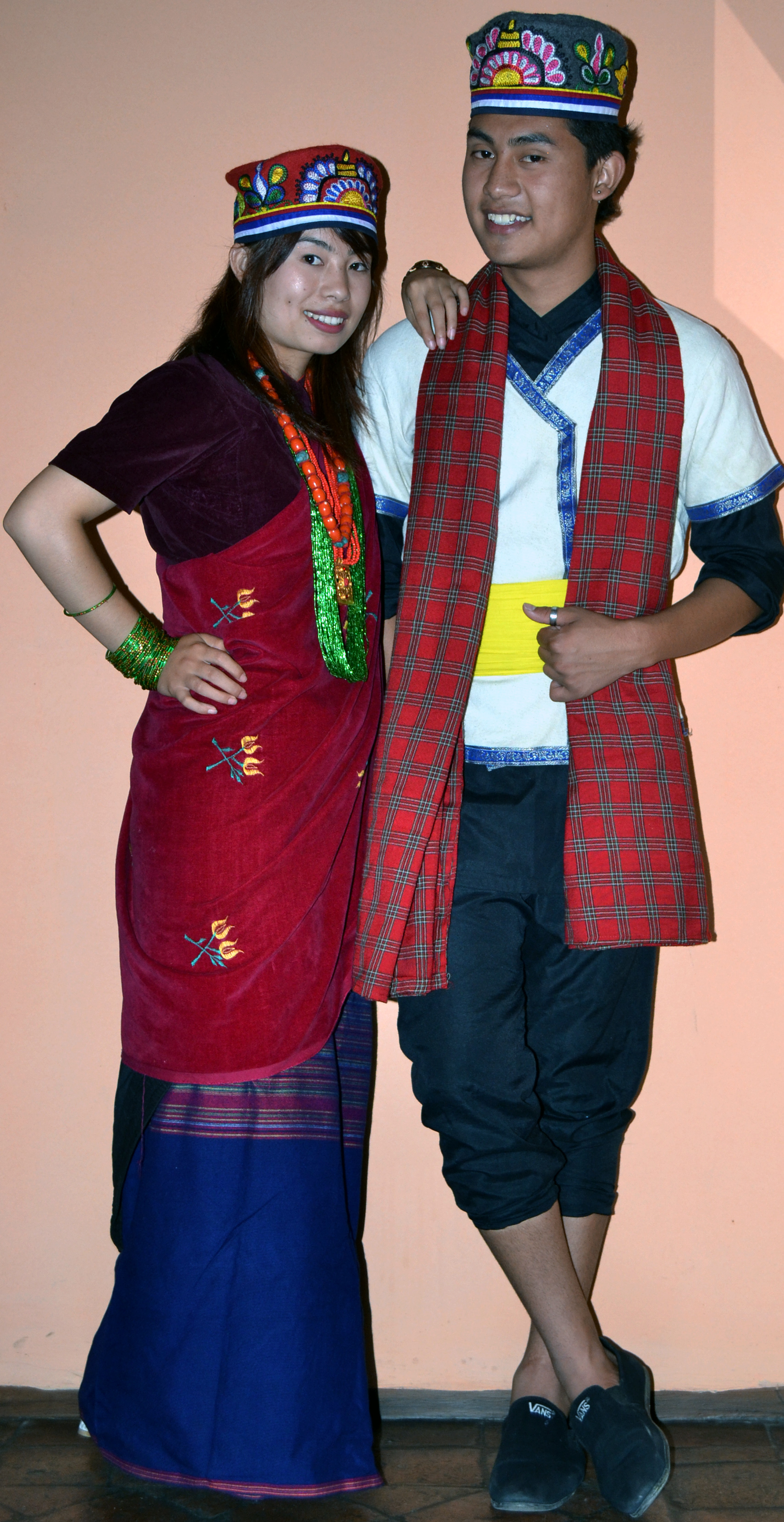
Tamang traditional dress

== See also ==
- Dhaka topi
- Bhaad-gaaule topi
- Birke topi
