= Bhaad-gaaule =

Bhaad-gaaule or Bhad-gaole may refer to:

- A resident of the place Bhadgaon in Nepal
- A type of black cap/topi, especially made in the towns of Bhadgaon or Bhaktapur in Nepal, and a part of Newari traditional dress. This has been adopted as a part of Nepali national dress for men, as an alternative to the Palpali Dhaka topi.
