= Patuka =

- Material: Cotton

The Patuka or Patuki - Paṭukā (पटुका) is a traditional Nepalese waistband or sash, typically a long piece of cloth tied around the waist by mountain and heavy workers to support the back and prevent pain. Generally a Nepalese starts to wear one during early childhood. Not only does a Patuka provide support for the waist and back, it also serves as a makeshift pocket for water vessels, snacks, tools, and money. The Patuka is a part of the attire of many ethnic groups in Nepal. For example, it is worn by men in the Terai region and also worn during festivals and ceremonies, representing cultural identity; typically for religious occasions, it is accompanied by a kurta or sari. The Patuka is also a part of traditional attire of the Gurung people where it was used to secure the Kachhad or Kaas, a white wrap-around skirt reaching the thighs or knees made of plain white cotton, now obsolete, now replaced with army-style belts for convenience.

== Function and Benefits ==
The lower back and core muscles are supported when the Patuka is securely wrapped around the waist, which reduces strain during physical labor. Farmers, porters, and manual workers rely on this belt when laboring in fields, transporting large goods, or traveling long distances. Studies have found that people who wear a Patuka experiences a lower incidence of back pain. Wearing the Patuka can increase intra-abdominal pressure which supports the spine and reduces the compression force on the lumbosacral spine during physical stress.

The Patuka is also used as a makeshift pocket in rural settings for carrying essential things like seeds, tools, money, or food without an external bag.

In many communities, new mothers wrapped Patuka tightly around the abdomen to aid in postnatal recovery as it supports the muscles, promotes healing and reverts the body back to its natural shape.

== See also ==
- Chaubandi Cholo
- Newar traditional clothing
- Dhaka topi
