= Chaubandi Cholo =

Type of traditional Nepali women's clothing

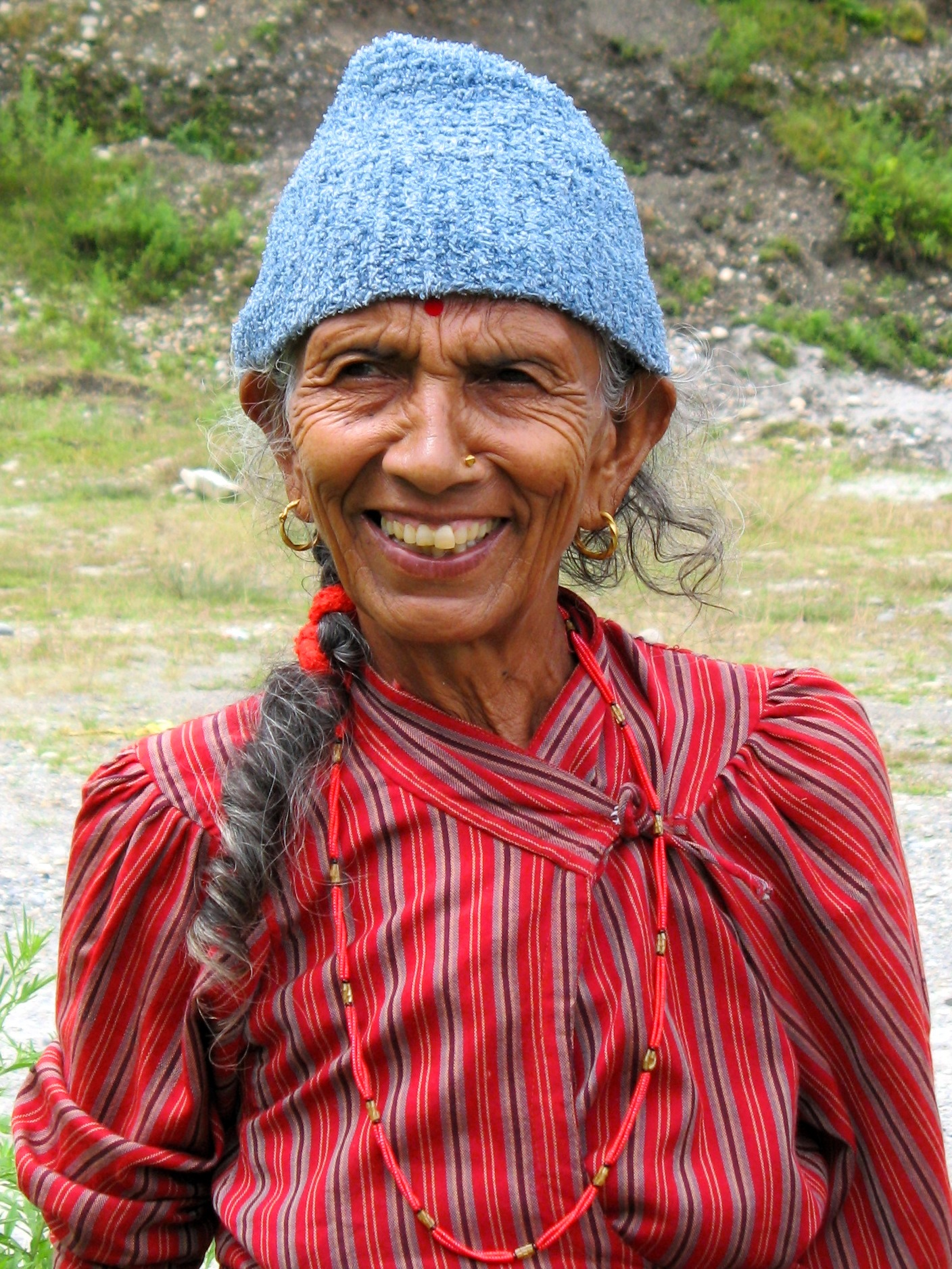
Nepali woman wearing Chaubandi Cholo

Chaubandi Cholo is a type of traditional Nepali women's clothing. It is often cotton in a red or white geometric print, but can differ between regional cultures.

Traditionally, parents and maternal uncles give a set of traditional clothes (sari or Guniu-Cholo) to girls before they reach the age of 8 years. These are usually given on special occasions, like pujas, Dashain, or another auspicious day. The girl is given a set of tradition clothes that include Guniu-Choli, fariya and patuka, along with accessories like lachi and sir-bandi. The other members of the family put tika on their forehead and bless them with gifts and cash. The blouse is typically wrapped and can have an open or closed neck. It is often worn with a sārī-like wrapped skirt.

Wearing the chaubandi cholo as traditional wear has been encouraged by certain nationalist groups in Nepal and West Bengal.
