= Birke topi =

Traditional Nepalese cap

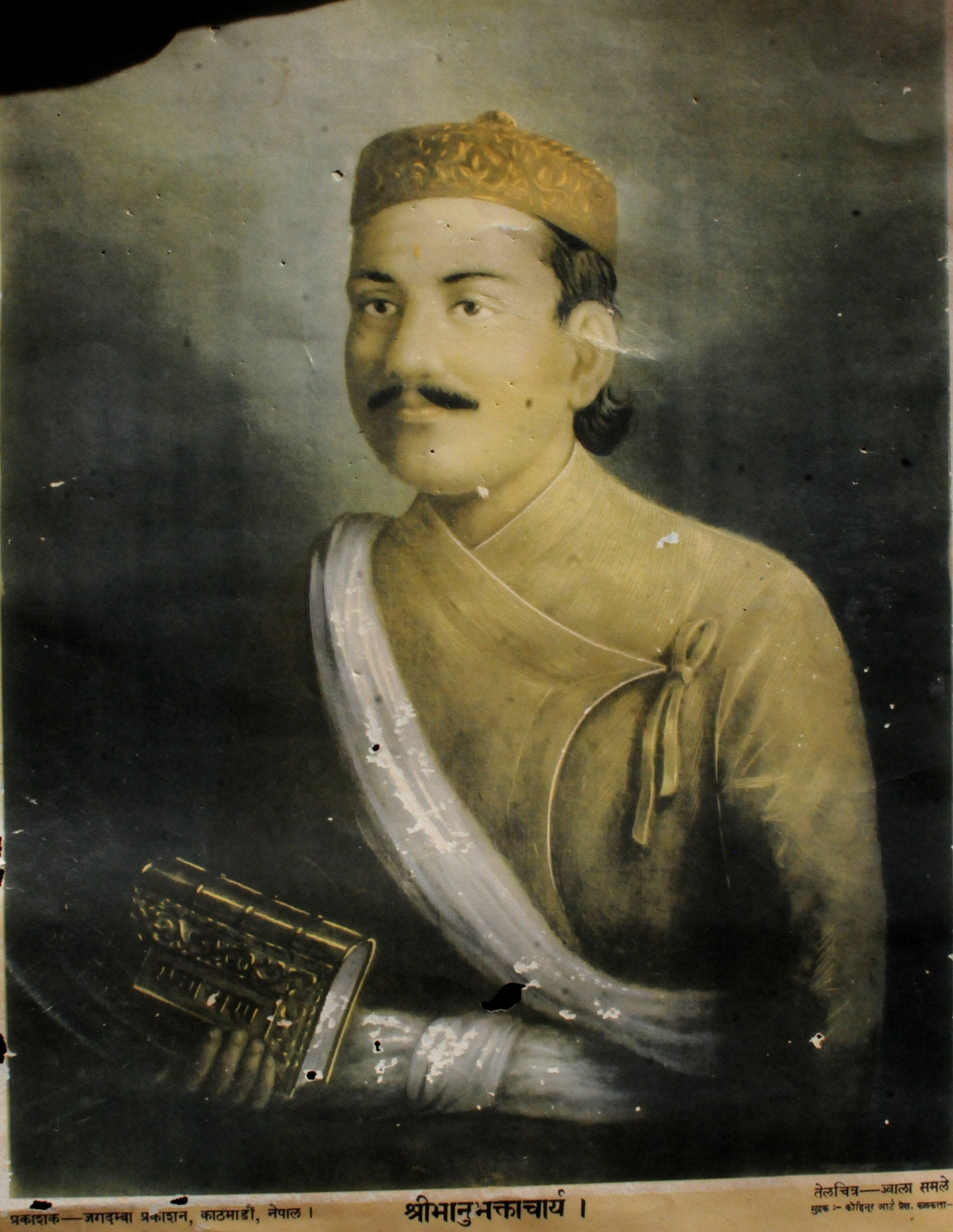
Nepali writer Bhanubhakta Acharya wearing the Birke topi

The Birke topi (Nepali: बिर्खे टोपी), birkhe topi or Bhanubhakta-styled topi is a traditional cap worn in the western hilly region of Nepal. It was popularized by the poet Aadikavi Bhanubhakta Acharya.

== Structure ==
It resembles the lid of traditional pots with its cylindrical shape and bobble at the top. It is usually available in black without printing or embroidery, but can be in other colors with patterns and designs. It also shares resemblance with the Himachali cap but the Birke topi has a bobble at the top.

== Modern usage ==
The use of this cap is quite rare in the modern Nepalese society. People prefer Dhaka topi and Bhaadgaule topi to Birkhe topi. This topi is now usually worn on special occasion such as anniversary of Bhanubhakta Acharya. In the honor of the poet, the officials of Bhanu municipality in Tanahun district (Acharya's hometown) decided to wear the topi on the job.

== Gallery ==
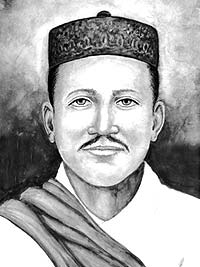
Portrait of Motiram Bhatta in a Birke topi

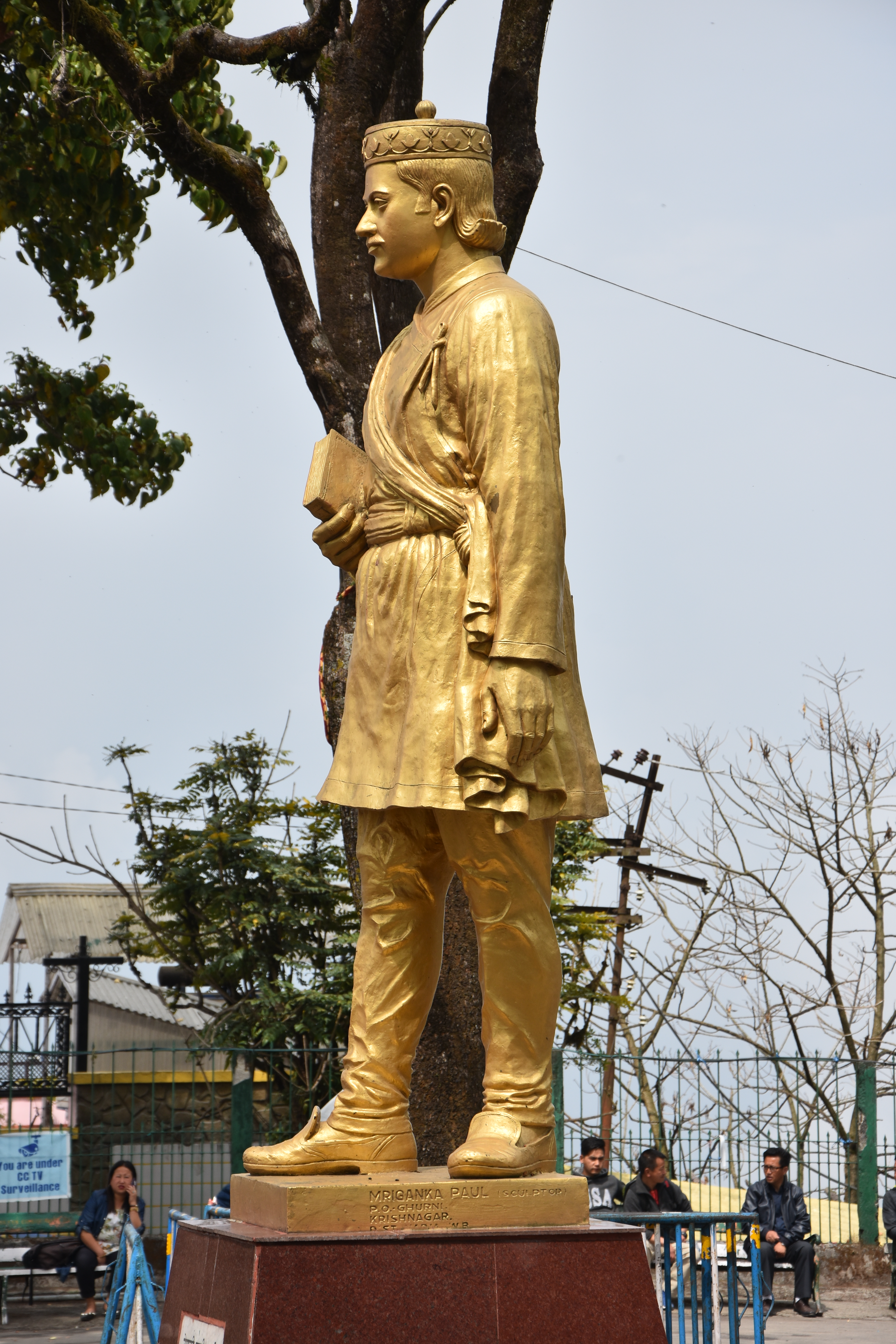
Statue of Bhanubhakta Acharya in Darjeeling, India, wearing Daura-suruwal and Birke topi

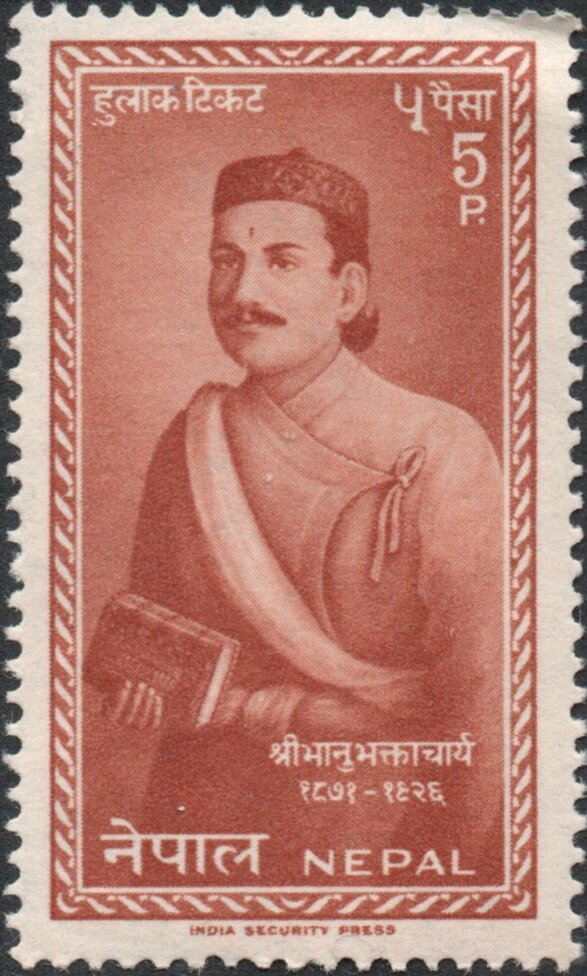
A commemorative stamp of Bhanubhakta Acharya wearing Birkhe topi

== See also ==
- Bhadgaunle Topi
- Dhaka topi
- Gandhi cap
- List of hat styles
