= Bhadgaunle Topi =

Nepalese traditional cap

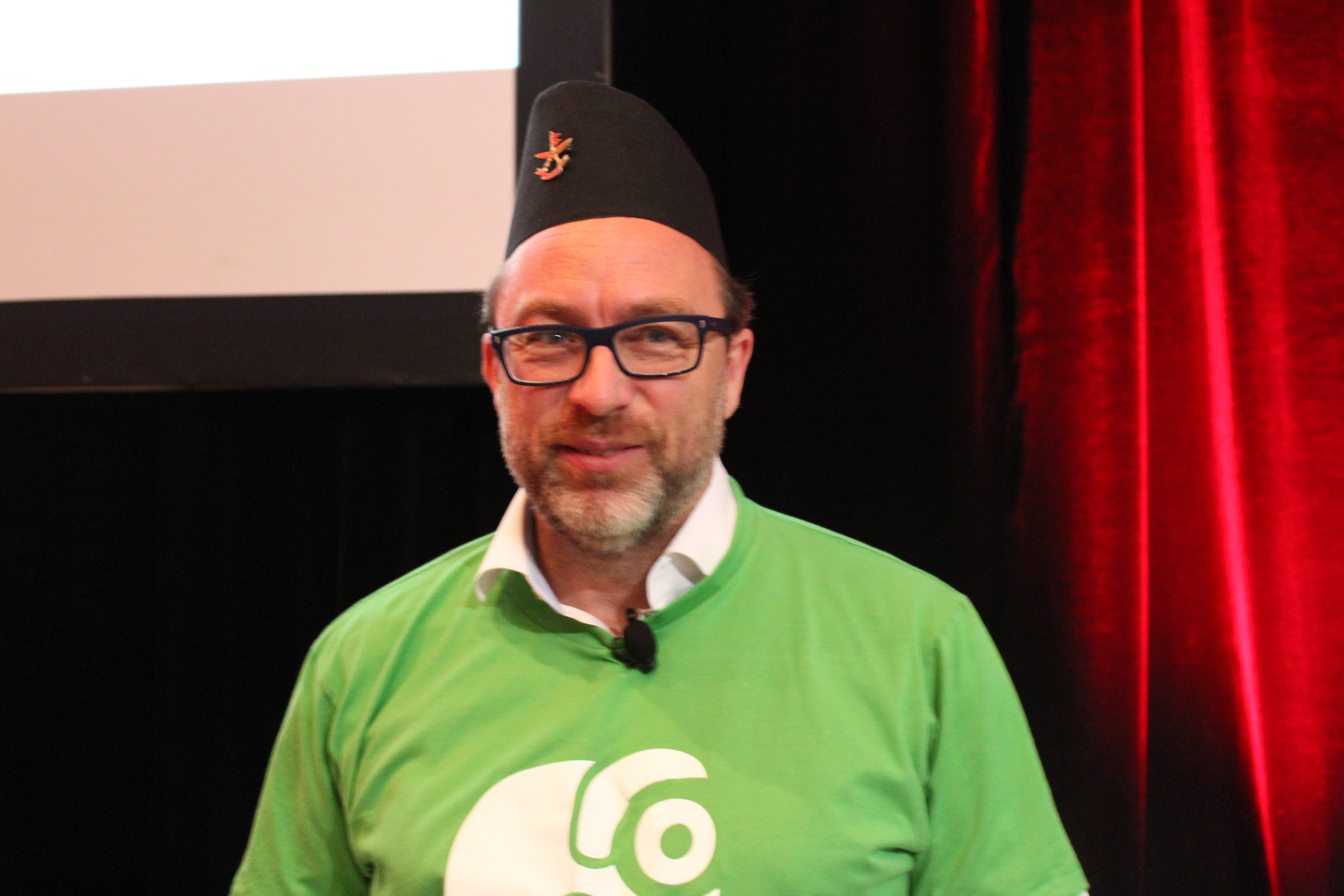
Wikipedia's co-founder Jimmy Wales wearing Bhadgaunle topi during closing ceremony of Wikimania-2015, at Mexico City, Mexico

A Bhadgaunle Topi (Nepali: भादगाउँले टोपी, romanized: Bhādagāũle Ṭopī) or Kalo Topi (Nepali: कालो टोपी) is a type of hat worn by Nepalis. The hat has been adopted as a part of Nepali national dress for men, as an alternative to the Palpali Dhaka topi.

== History ==
The hat is said to be in used since Malla era in Nepal, according to historians. However, the hat was only limited to Kathmandu Valley then. The hat became famous nationwide after King Tribhuvan and his son Mahendra started wearing it.

Historically, in the Panchayat era and earlier, the traditional black cap, produced by artisans in Bhaktapur, used to be the preferred accessory for men in Kathmandu. It was not just preferred for formal occasions or daily wear—all Nepali men had to don one if they wanted access to government offices and in halls of power, such as Singha Durbar.

== Gallery ==
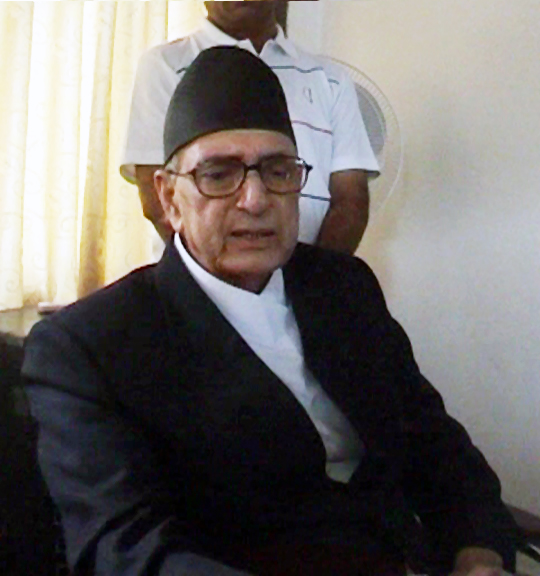
Former PM Girija Prasad Koirala wearing Bhadgaunle topi

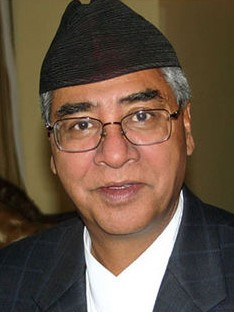
PM Sher Bahadur Deuba wearing Bhadgaunle topi

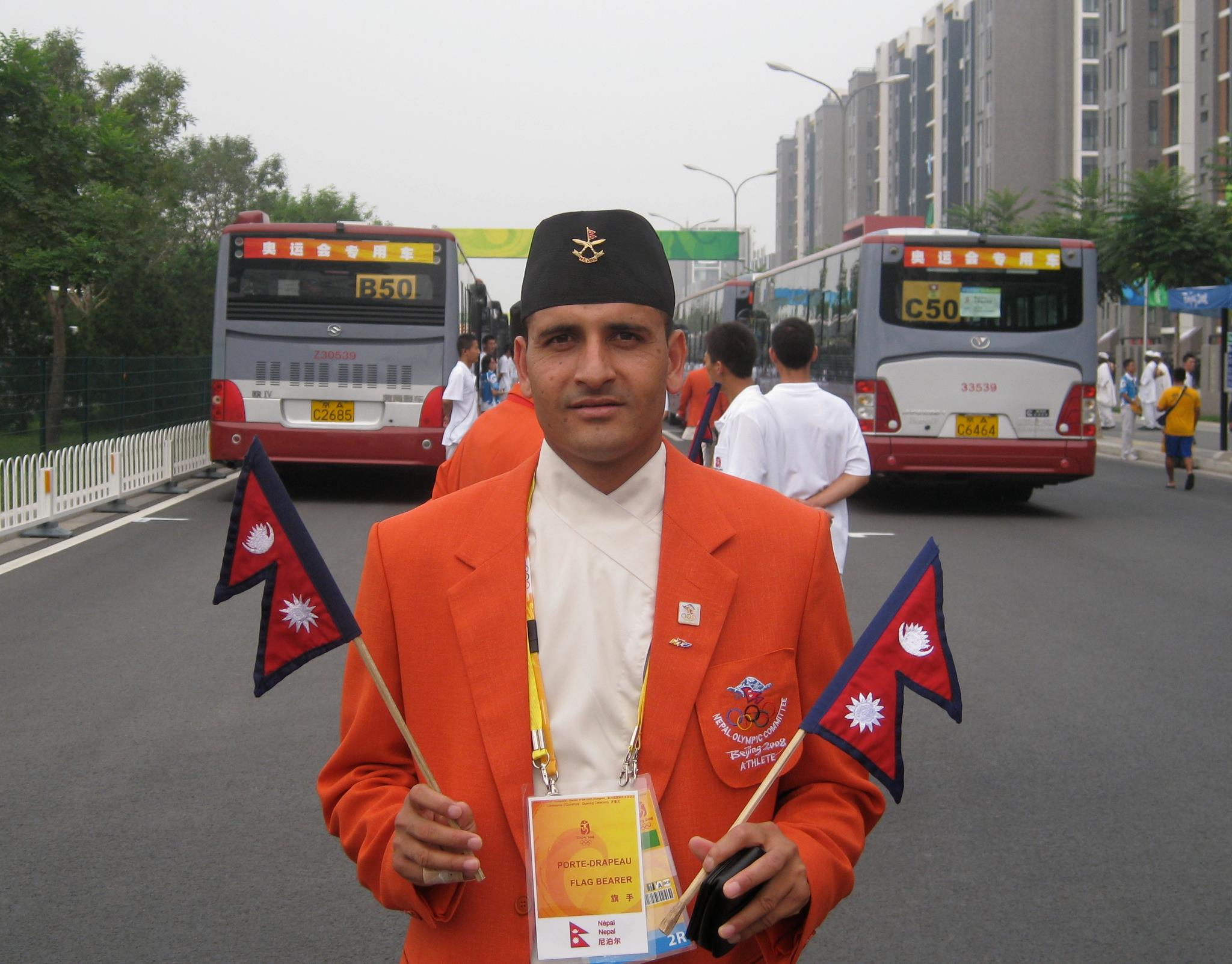
Taekwando player Deepak Bista

== See also ==
- List of hat styles
- Dhaka topi
- Birke topi
- Gandhi cap
