= Dhaka topi =

Nepali hat

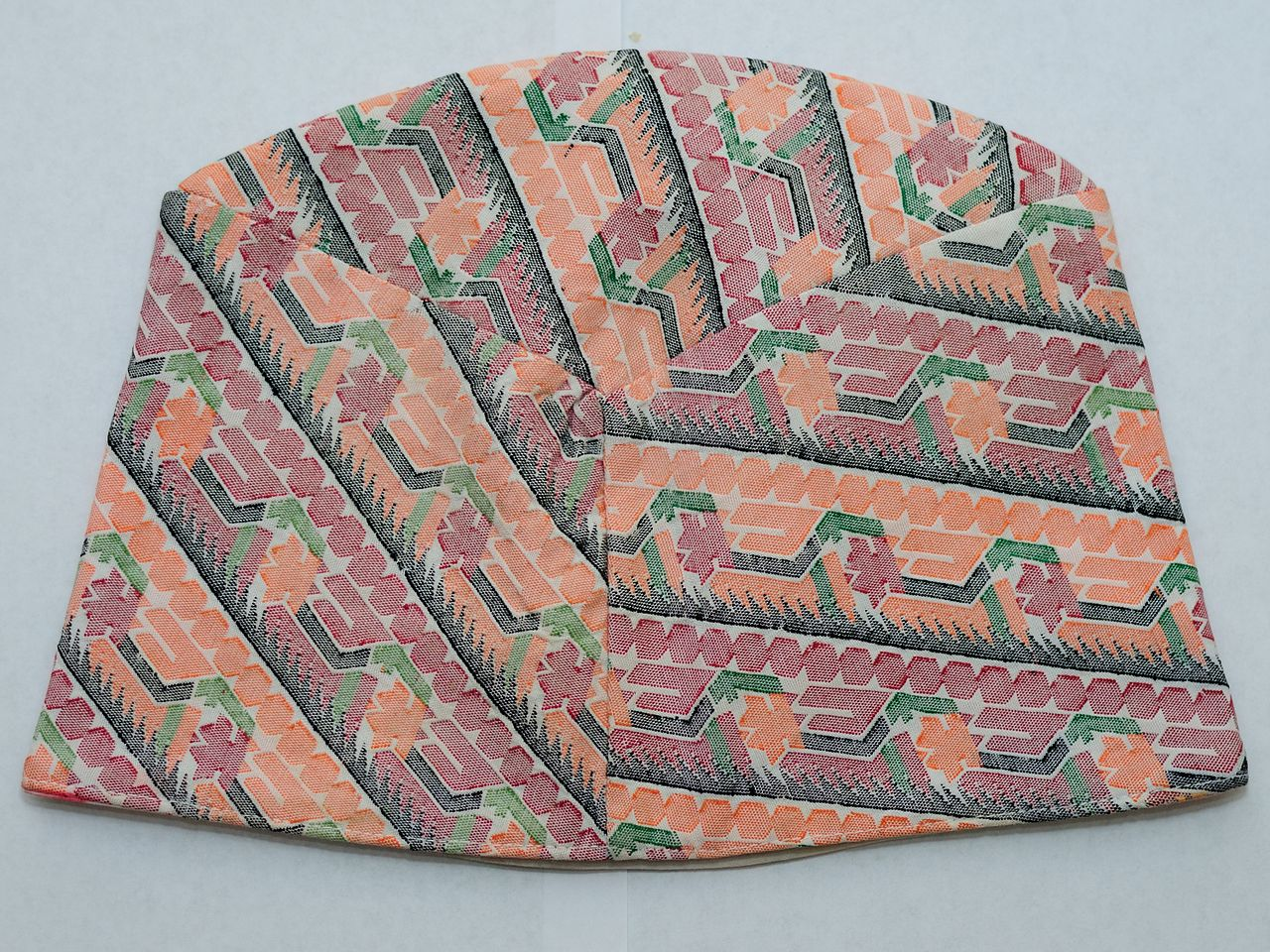
Dhaka topi unfolded

The Dhaka topi (Nepali: ढाका टोपी [ɖʱaka ʈopi]), is a traditional Nepalese cloth hat which forms part of Nepalese national dress, and worn by men on a daily basis in the hilly regions of the country. It is also popular among Nepali-speaking Indian communities in Sikkim, Assam, West Bengal, and Uttarakhand.

== History ==
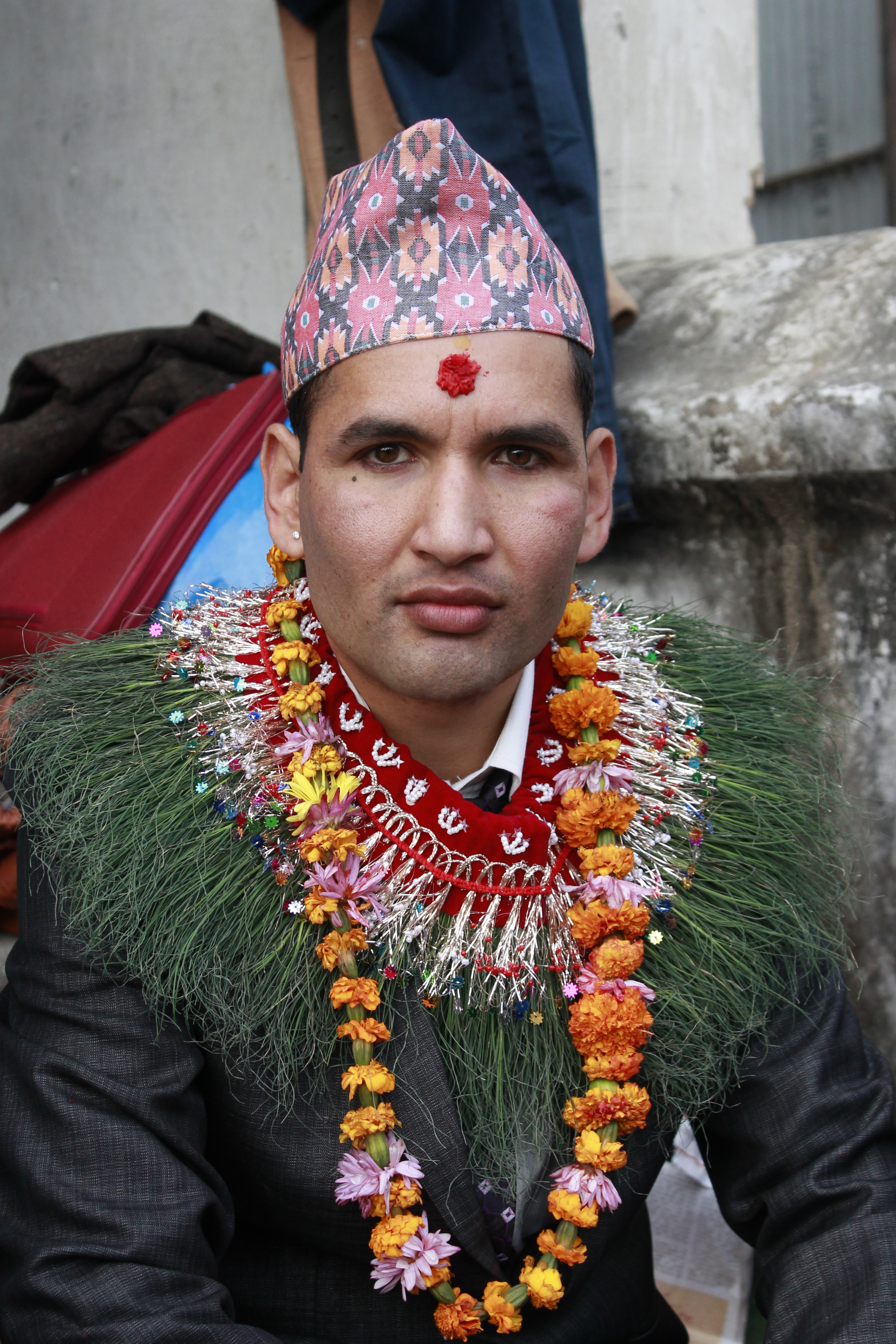
Groom wearing Dhaka topi

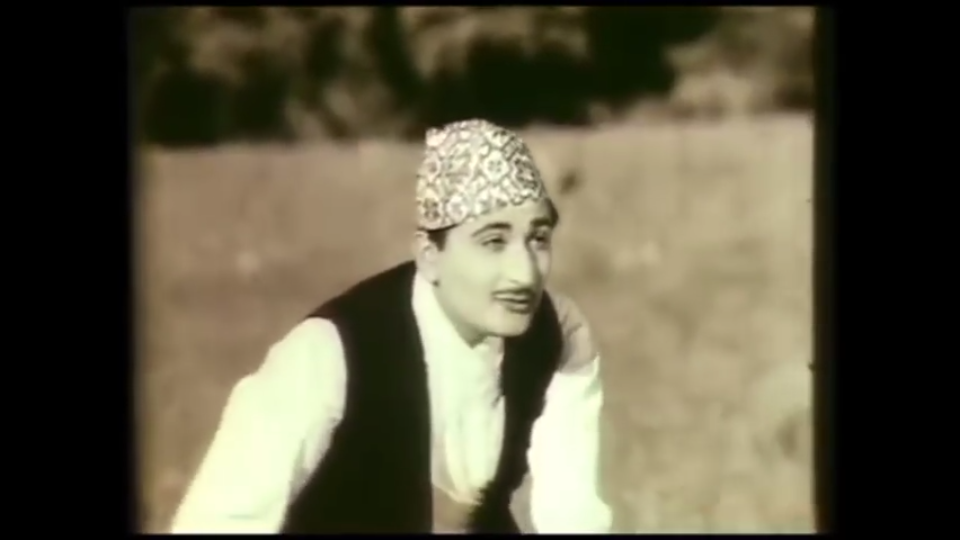
CP Lohani wearing Dhaka topi in Maitighar, a 1966 Nepalese film

In Nepal Bhasa, thread is called ka ("का"), raw thread is called kachika ("काचीका"), while the decorative thread worn by women when tying their hair is called sachika ("साचीका"). Similarly, the special thread used to make caps is called dhaka ("धाका"). A cap made from fabric woven with dhaka is called a Dhaka topi (Dhaka cap).

The Dhaka topi was a part of the Nepalese national dress, and a symbol of Nepalese nationality. It became popular during the reign of King Mahendra, who ruled between 1955 and 1972, and made wearing a Dhaka topi mandatory for official photographs for passports and documents. Dhaka topis are given away as gifts during Dashain and Tihar festivals. Dhaka topis was also worn by government officials as a part of the national dress. In the times of King Mahendra, dhaka topis for rent were available near the Singha Durbar (literally Lion Hall) in Kathmandu. The badge of kukri cross is worn on the cap largely by officials in Kathmandu or when a Nepalese visit the palace.

== Significance ==
Although Dhaka clothing no longer dominates Nepalese fashion, it remains an integral part of the hill region. While many Nepalis now seldom wear a cap unless they are attending some cultural programme, many other men and women still wear costumes made from Dhaka on a regular basis, as it remains common sight on the streets of Kathmandu.

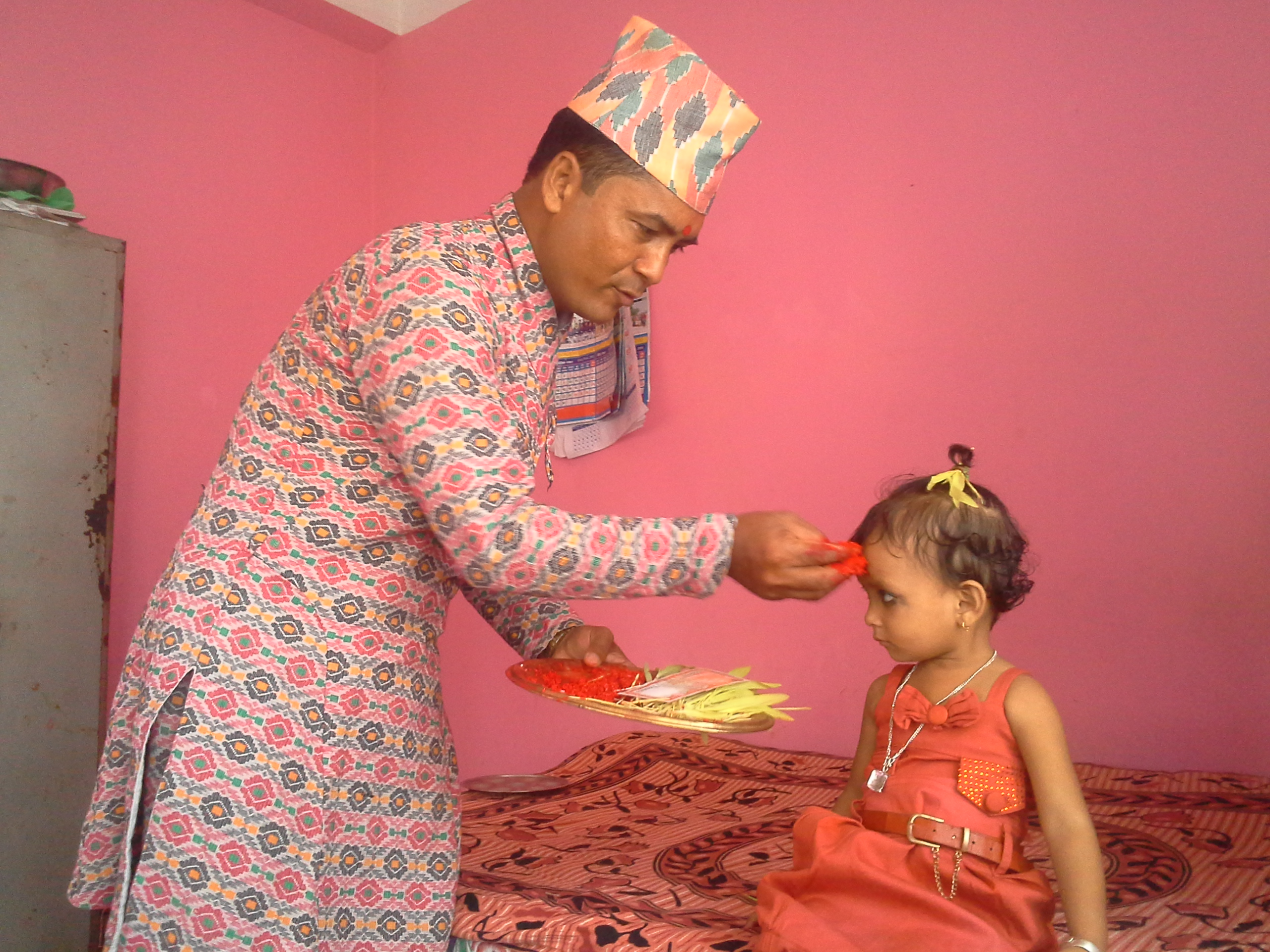
Nepali wearing a Dhaka topi during a festival

Dhaka cloth still plays a role in rituals, such as weddings and funerals of many ethnic groups living in the valley. Despite many hand-loom establishments that producing it, they still struggle to meet the constantly increasing demand for Dhaka topi. According to Tejeswar Babu Gongah, a columnist, cultural activist and cultural expert, "The topi which is round at the base, with a height of 3 to 4 inches, indicates the mountains and the Himalayas of the country. The Dhaka topi is said to represent the mountain after the melting of the ice. The melted ice enables the growth of greenery and vibrantly coloured flowers in the lower regions of the mountain."

International Nepali Dhoti and Topi Day is a day celebrated by Nepali people globally on 1 January to keep Nepali traditional fashion alive. Nepalis of Madhesi and Tharu ethnicity wear Dhoti-kurtha and Gamchha, while all Nepali people wear Dhaka and Bhadgaunle topis on that day. Though topis are more prevalent in the day than dhoti, Madhesis have taken the opportunity to promote their distinct identity. Madhesis and Tharu are often discriminated against because of their refusal to wear Dhaka topi.Traditional Nepali Dhaka topi. Source: Pacific Press / LightRocket via Getty Images The Dhaka topi (Nepali: ढाका टोपी) is a traditional Nepalese brimless cap made from hand-loomed, intricately patterned cotton fabric known as dhaka. Recognized as an integral component of Nepal’s national dress alongside the Daura-Suruwal, it serves as a prominent symbol of Nepalese cultural identity and national pride. While historically woven by hand on traditional wooden looms in eastern regions like Terhathum and central hubs like Palpa (notably Tansen), the cap gained nationwide prominence during the mid-20th century under King Mahendra, who mandated its use for official administrative dress and government documentation. Characterized by its flat-topped, slightly pleated cylindrical structure and vibrant geometric motifs, the Dhaka topi is traditionally worn by men during formal ceremonies, weddings, and major festivals such as Dashain and Tihar, and it is widely celebrated globally on International Nepali Topi Day on January 1.

== Dhaka cloth ==
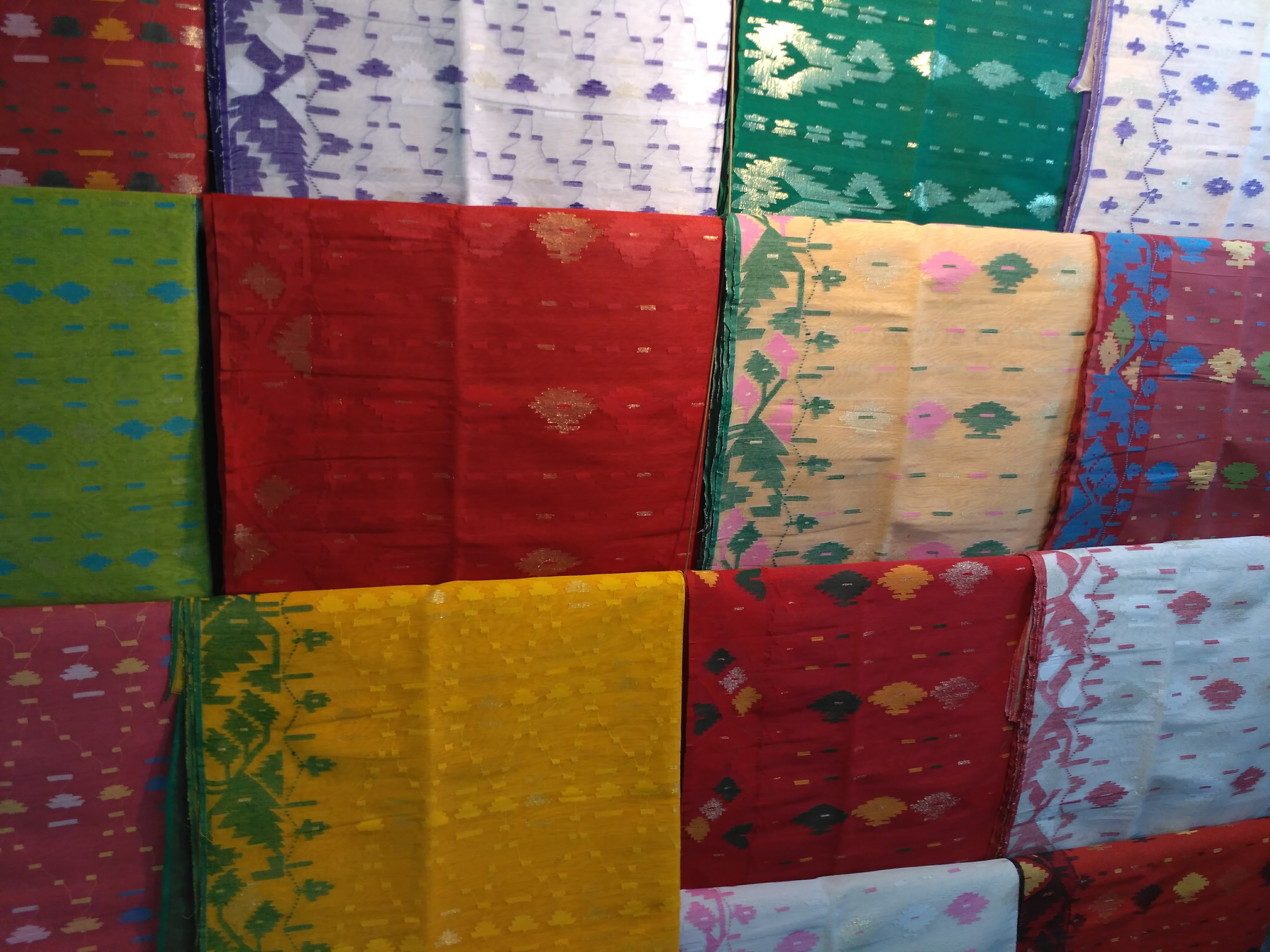
Dhakai saree patterns

Dhaka, the hand-spun cotton inlay-pattern weaving used to make intricately patterned, colourful panels for Dhaka topis, is the most remarkable and visible cotton textile in Nepal. Pre-dyed cotton is imported from India and weaved by master craftspeople into intricate patterns using only a few colours. The fabric is also used for a type of blouse called Dhaka ko cholo, literally meaning a "blouse made of dhaka fabric", and shawls for women. Some farmers and weavers have made preliminary trials of a silk Dhaka topi cloth with limited success.

There are different myths about the origin of Dhaka fabric. One story tells that a minister returned from Dhaka, Bangladesh with idea of such a topi, which eventually replaced the traditional black cap in popularity. Another story tells that name is so because the originally cloths and threads for Dhaka topi used to come from Dhaka, often resembling Dhakai muslin (fine cotton of Dhaka). The method of pattern weaving practised around Dhaka, called Jamdani, is considerably different from what is currently practised by Nepalese weavers. A few fragments of Dhaka fabric in the collection of the National Museum of Nepal are assumed to be from early 20th century.

The most popular legend attributes the introduction of Dhaka weaving to Ganesh Man Maharjan, who worked in an Jamdani factory in 1950s. He was inspired to learn it when he noticed Dambar Kumari, Shree Teen Junga Bahadur Rana's daughter, wearing Dhaka clothes she brought back from Benares. Upon returning to his native Palpa his wife and he established a factory to produce Dhaka cloth in 1957 with one spool and one hand-operated Charkha spinning-wheel bought from Kathmandu and local weavers trained by Mahajan. His operation flourished because of the high price of superior quality imports. As the Shah dynasty government showed a preference for Dhaka cloth and topis made out of it, other weavers started following Maharajan. By early 1970, his own factory Swadeshi Vastrakala Palpali Dhaka Udhyog had grown to employ some 350 workers. At that time Jaishanker Textile Industry, Khanal Textile Industry, and Nabin Textile Industry were the major producers of cotton yarn used to make Dhaka cloth.

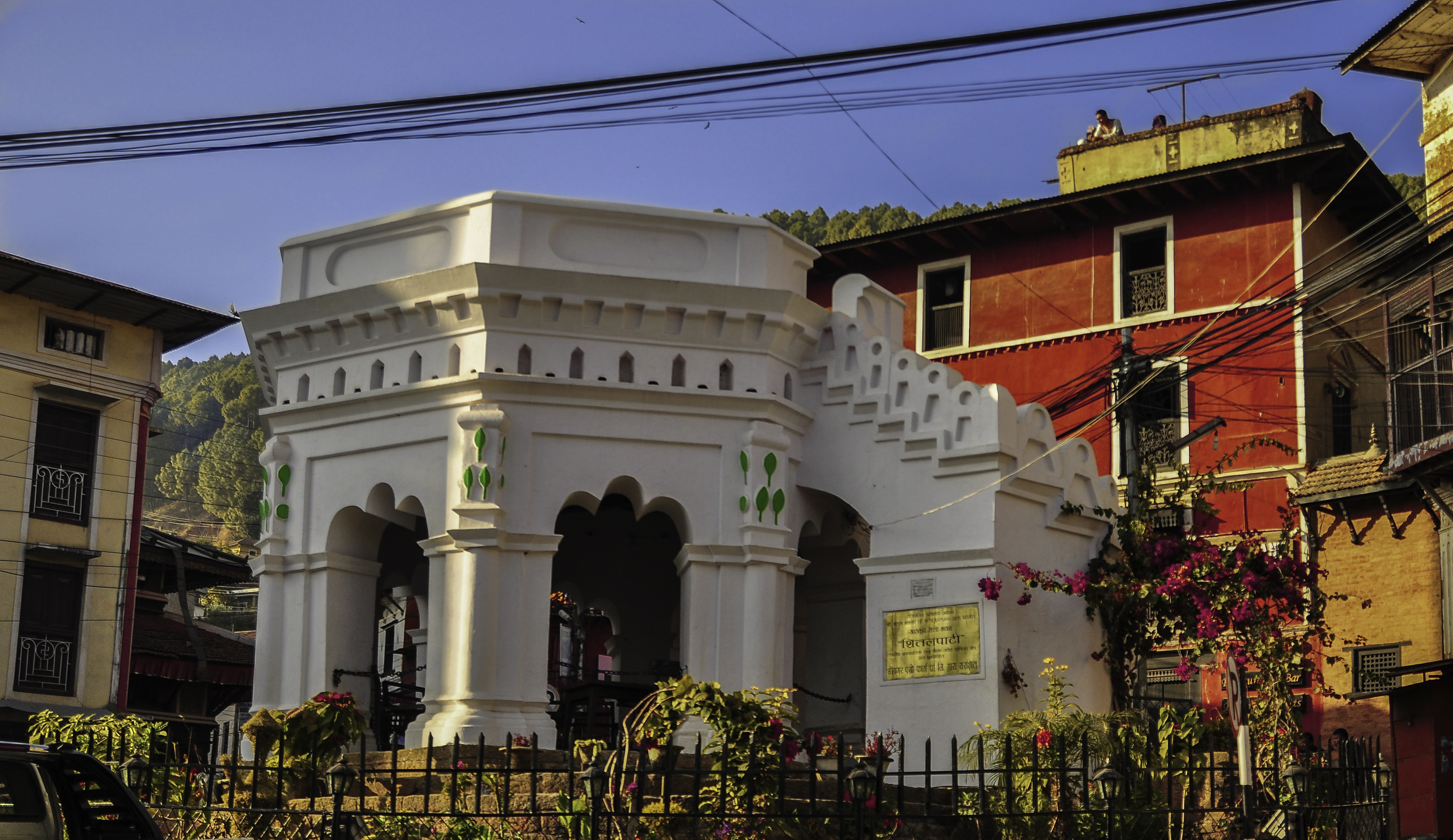
The Main Square in Tansen

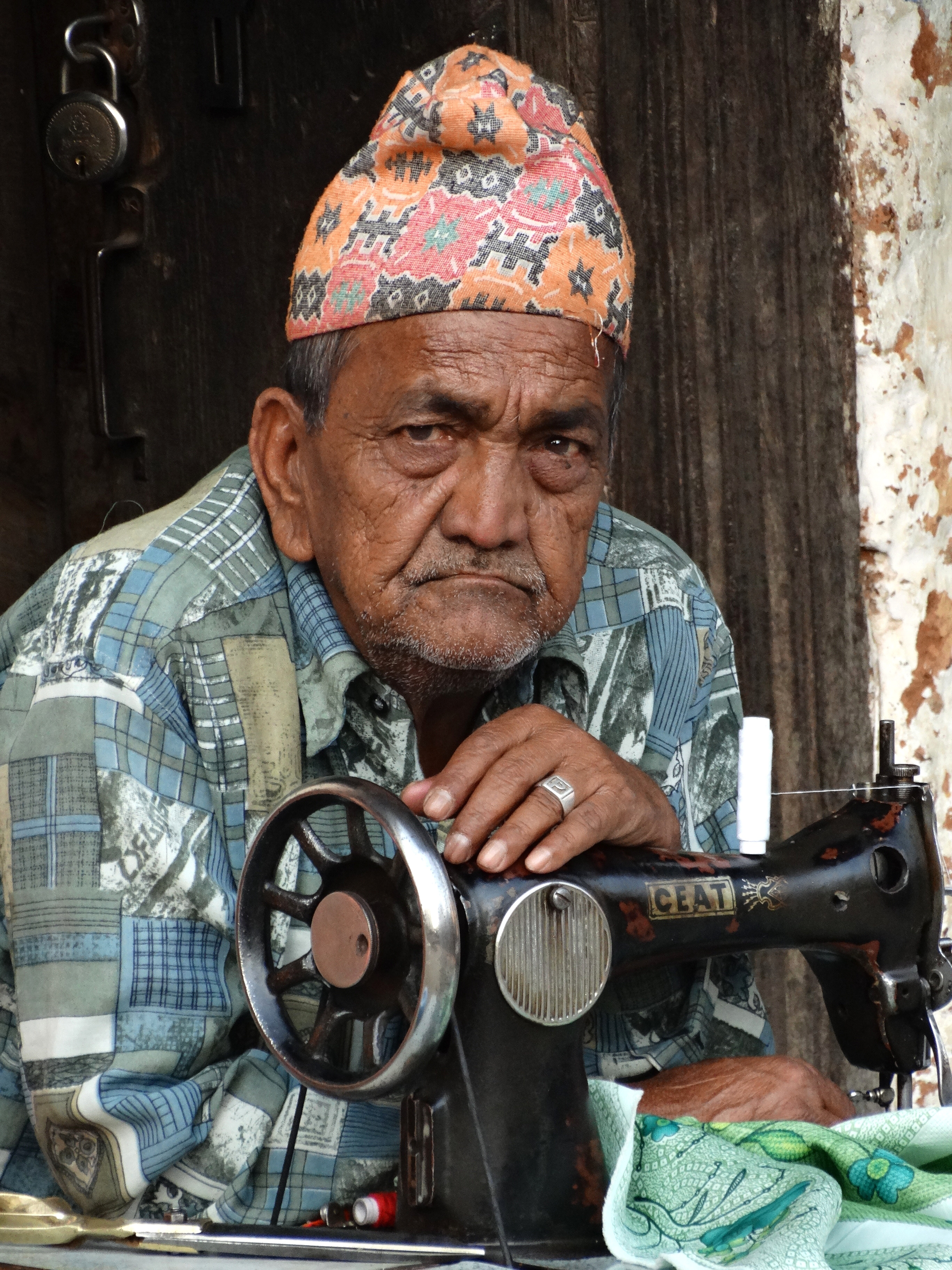
Seamster in Tansen

Despite booming business and government incentives, most weavers were poor. An expert weaver worked 12–16 hours a day for a month to produce 4–5 metres of Dhaka cloth. But, their wage was a measly 10-30 Nepalese rupees, one egg and 250 grams of Jeri. In 1970s, the Dhaka weaving industry in Palpa changed significantly as it was introduced to Jacquard loom and easily available shiny acrylic fiber. Jacquard looms made it possible to produce several meter a day, instead of the average 9-inches on a hand-loom. Many weavers lost their jobs, Palpa lost its near monopoly and Dhaka caps lost some of the intricacies of its patterns.

Now weavers in capital Kathmandu, Palpa District in the middle mountains area, especially its headquarters Tansen municipality, and Tehrathum District in the East are the main producers of Dhaka cloth. Limbus and Rais from the middle mountains are famous for the Dhaka cloth they produce. Tansen, the most renowned source of Dhaka topis, is colourful town with Magar, Brahmin, Chhetris with Newars who came in the 19th century to seek their fortune. Apart its famous Dhaka fabric for topic, cholos and shawls, Tensen is also known for its metal craft including Karuwa mugs, jars and other items. It is a custom to buy Palpali Dhaka fabric products as souvenir while visiting the area, including topis, shawls and thailo purses that has two pairs of drawstrings to open and close the purse. A Dhaka topi industry has been established in Darjeeling by Indian Gorkhas.

== Topis ==
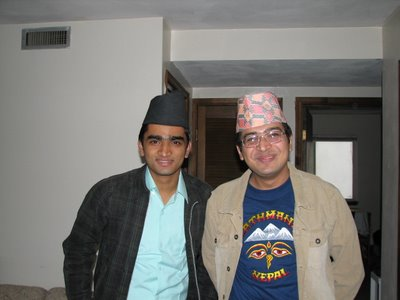
Two Nepalese men wearing Bhaad-gaaule topi (left) and Dhaka topi (right)

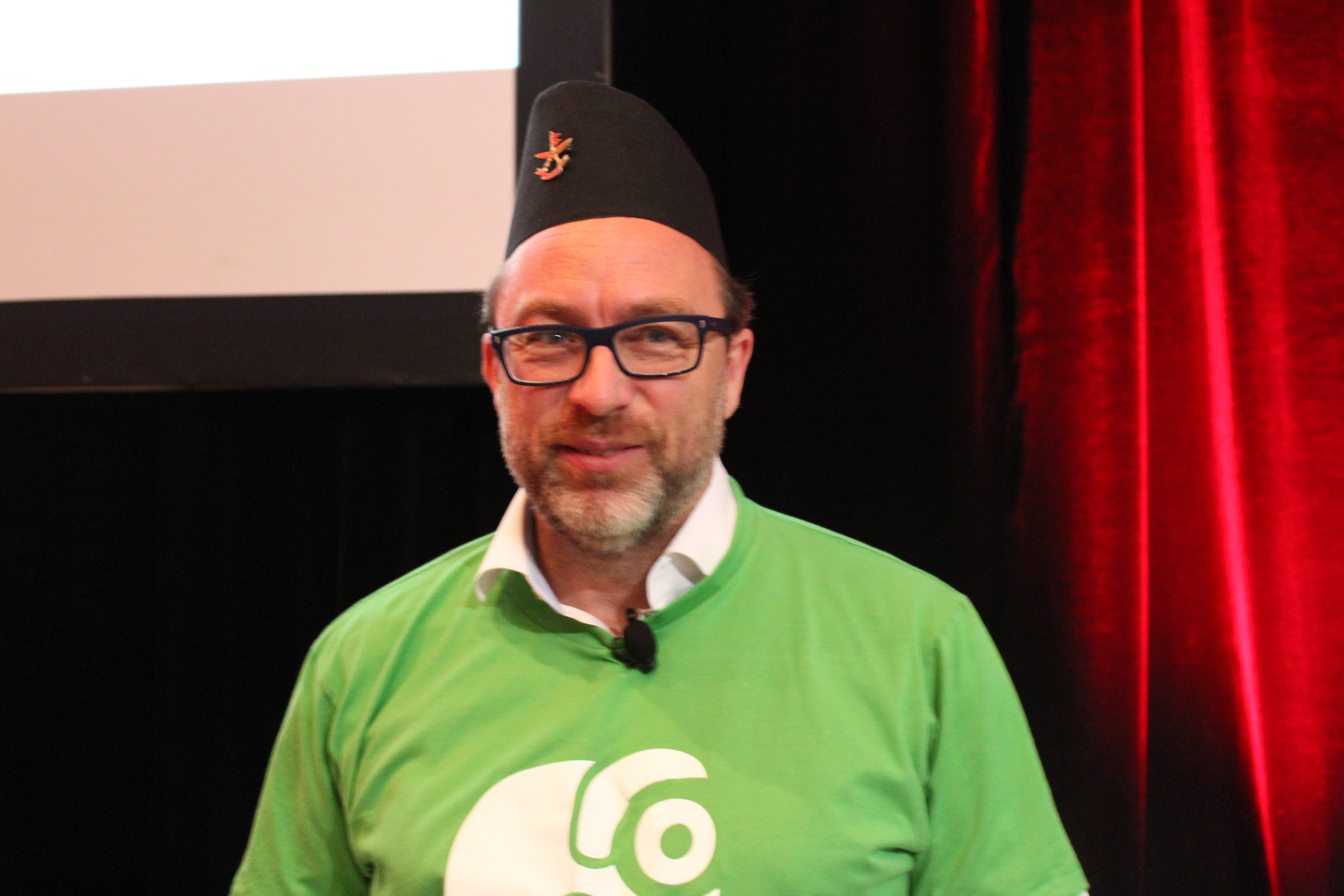
Jimmy Wales wearing a Bhaad-gaaule topi at closing ceremony of Wikimania 2015

The traditional outfit of Nepali men features Daura-Suruwal (Nepalese shirt and trouser suit), Patuka (cloth wrapped around the waist instead of a belt), ista coat (the Nepalese sleeveless half-jacket) and a topi, while Gunyou Cholo (a ghagra-kurta style women's dress) is the dress for a woman who generally wore no topi. Various ethnic groups wear their own constituent traditional dresses. For instance, the Tamang women wear distinctive headgear with an added cotton or woollen wrapper is also worn over the cap. Some Buddhist Tamang women wear Bakhus which are ethnic to the Tibetan people.

The once mandatory topi of a Nepali man can be either black (called bhaad-gaaule or kalo topi) or multicoloured (called Dhaka or Nepali topi). Bhaad-gaaule topis are similar to Dhaka topi but they are black in colour given the fact that they are not made from Dhaka. Before the Nepali government started promoting Dhaka topis, Bhaad-gaaule topis largely made in Bhaktapur were the popular Nepali headgear, especially common to Newaris. These kalo topis (blacks caps), once preferred by Rana dynasty elites, are now making a comeback, particularly among the youth. Milliners of Bhaktapur, once almost put out of business by the advent of Dhaka topi, were making as many as 600 kalo topis a week by 2015. Besides Dhaka and kalo topis there are a number of other topis made and worn in Nepal including chuclie topi, birke topi, karchupe topi and cap topi.

== See also ==
- Bhadgaunle Topi
- Birke topi
- Gandhi cap
- List of hat styles
