= Gandhi cap =

White sidecap, pointed in front and back and having a wide band, worn in India

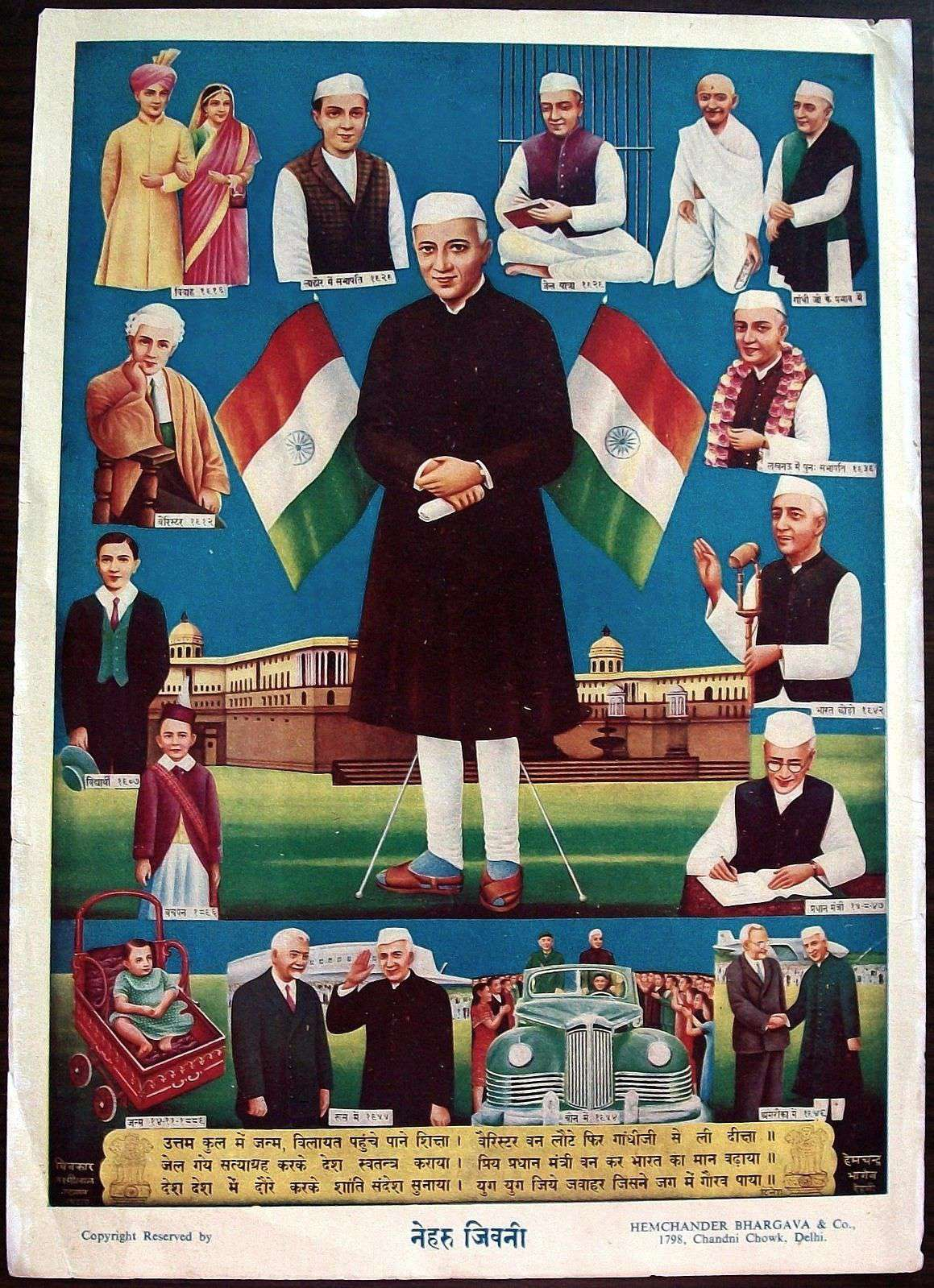
Nehru's life, poster from the 1950s, showing him wearing the Gandhi cap during 1929–1955

The Gandhi cap (Hindi: गाँधी टोपी) is a white sidecap, pointed in front and back and having a wide band. It is made out of khadi. It takes its name after the Indian leader Mahatma Gandhi, who created it and first popularised its use during the Indian independence movement.

Worn commonly by Indian independence activists, it became a symbolic tradition for politicians and political activists to wear in independent India.

== Genesis ==
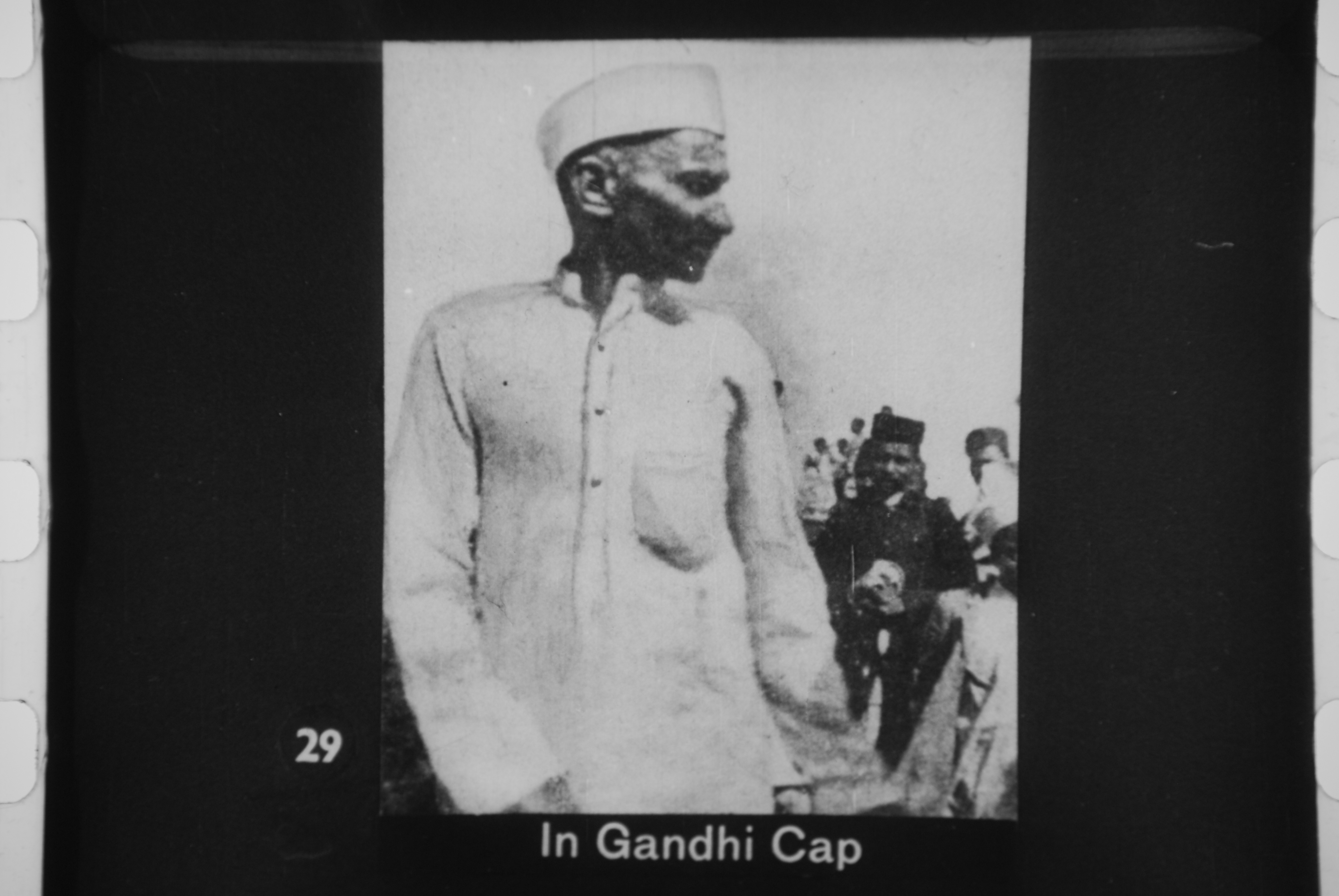
A photograph of Mahatma Gandhi wearing a Gandhi cap in 1920

Gandhi, in a conversation with Kaka Kalelkar, described how he created the Gandhi cap. Gandhi said that he looked at a number of caps from various parts of India and wanted to design a cap that would cover the head in hot weather and would be easy to keep in a pocket. He found Kashmiri cap to be coming close to what he wanted to design but it used wool. Gandhi writes that he instead used cotton cloth in white because white clothes are supposed to be washed more regularly and are easier to wash.

The Gandhi cap emerged in India during the Non-cooperation movement from 1920 to 1922, when it became the standard Indian National Congress dress as popularized by Gandhi.

By 1920, a substantial number of Indian males wore this cap. Colonial officials in the Central Provinces banned Indian Civil Service employees from wearing Gandhi caps.

Gandhi's homespun khadi attire of traditional Indian clothes were symbolic of his message of cultural pride, the use of Swadeshi goods (as opposed to those manufactured in Europe), self-reliance and solidarity with India's rural masses. The cap became common to most followers of Gandhi and members of the Indian National Congress. A connection to the independence movement was implied when any individual wore the cap in those times.

Black prisoners in South African prisons were required to wear a small headcover during the early 20th century. This has been cited as the genesis of the Gandhi Cap.

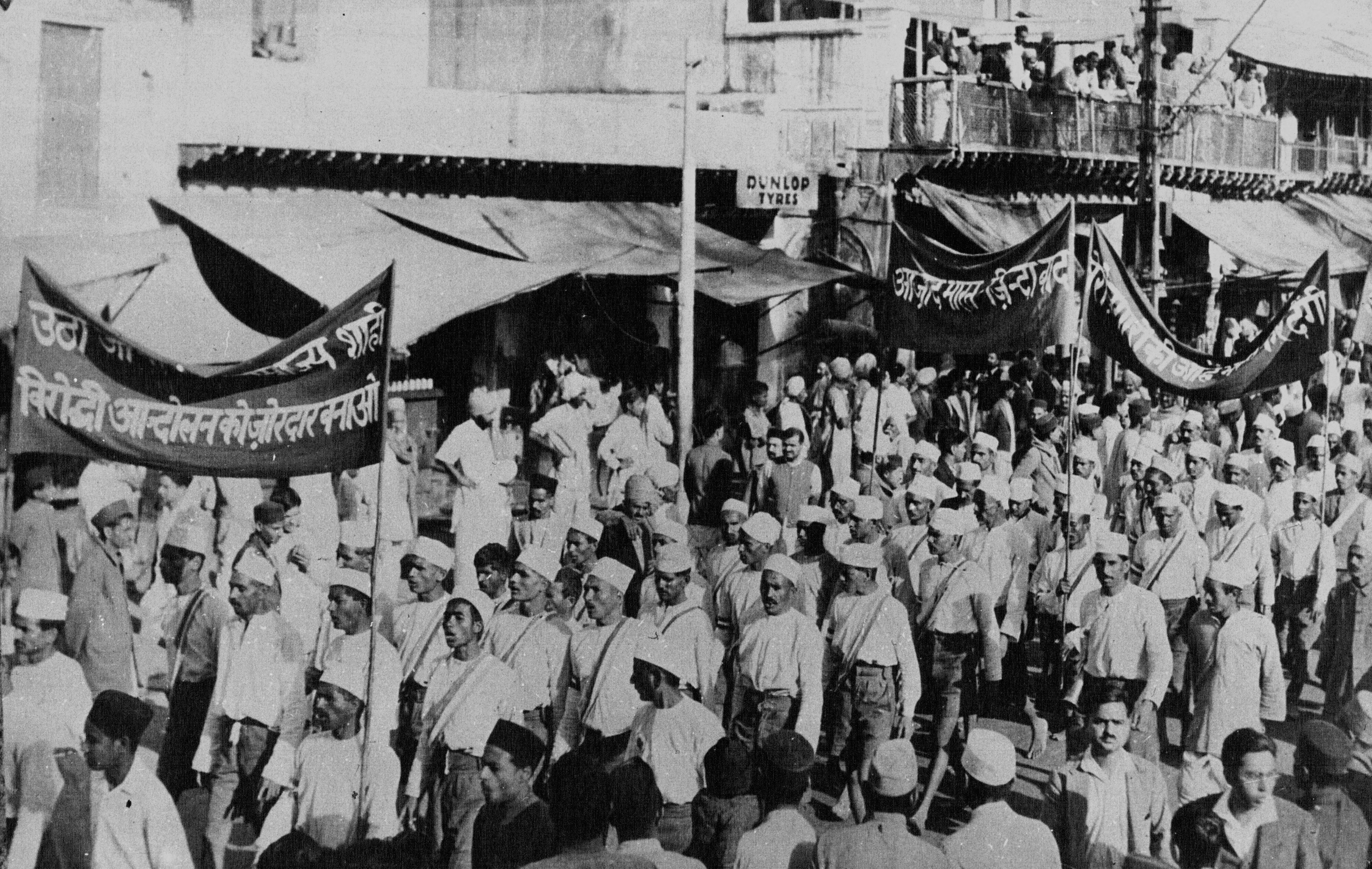
Members of the Indian National Congress marching in New Delhi in 1937

The Gandhi cap was also adopted by the members of Rashtriya Swayamsevak Sangh (RSS).

== After independence ==
The first generation of post-independence Indian politicians were almost universally members of the freedom struggle. The cap was regularly worn by Indian leaders like Jawaharlal Nehru, India's first Prime Minister and the succeeding prime ministers such as Lal Bahadur Shastri and Morarji Desai continued this tradition. Most members of the Indian Parliament (especially politicians and activists of the Congress party) wore khadi clothing and the Gandhi cap. Large numbers of people donned the cap while celebrating India's independence on 15 August or the promulgation of a republic on 26 January.

Jawaharlal Nehru was always remembered as having worn the cap. In 1964 a coin showing Nehru in profile was released which was widely criticized for lacking the cap. Another Nehru coin was later released in 1989 on his birth centenary, which showed him wearing a cap.

In later times, the cap had lost its popular and political appeal. Although many members of the Congress party continued the tradition, rival political parties preferred to dissociate themselves from the tradition linked with the Congress. The mass acceptance of Western-style clothing had also diminished the importance of wearing Indian-style clothes for politicians.

Thousands of people wearing Topi during Wari, Dehugaon, Maharashtra

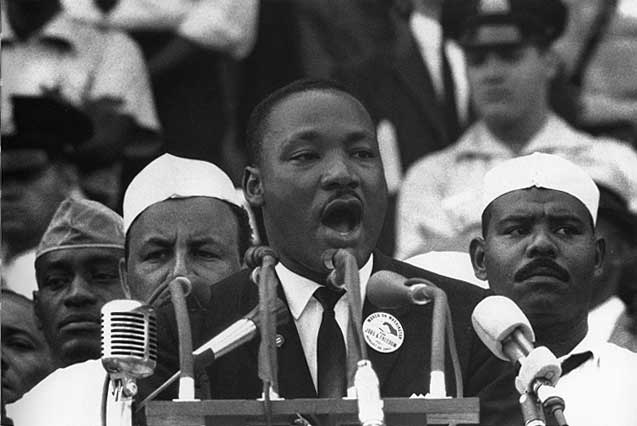
Supporters of Martin Luther King Jr. wearing the Gandhi Cap during the iconic "I Have a Dream" speech

The cap remains the most popular everyday headgear worn by men in rural parts of Maharashtra.

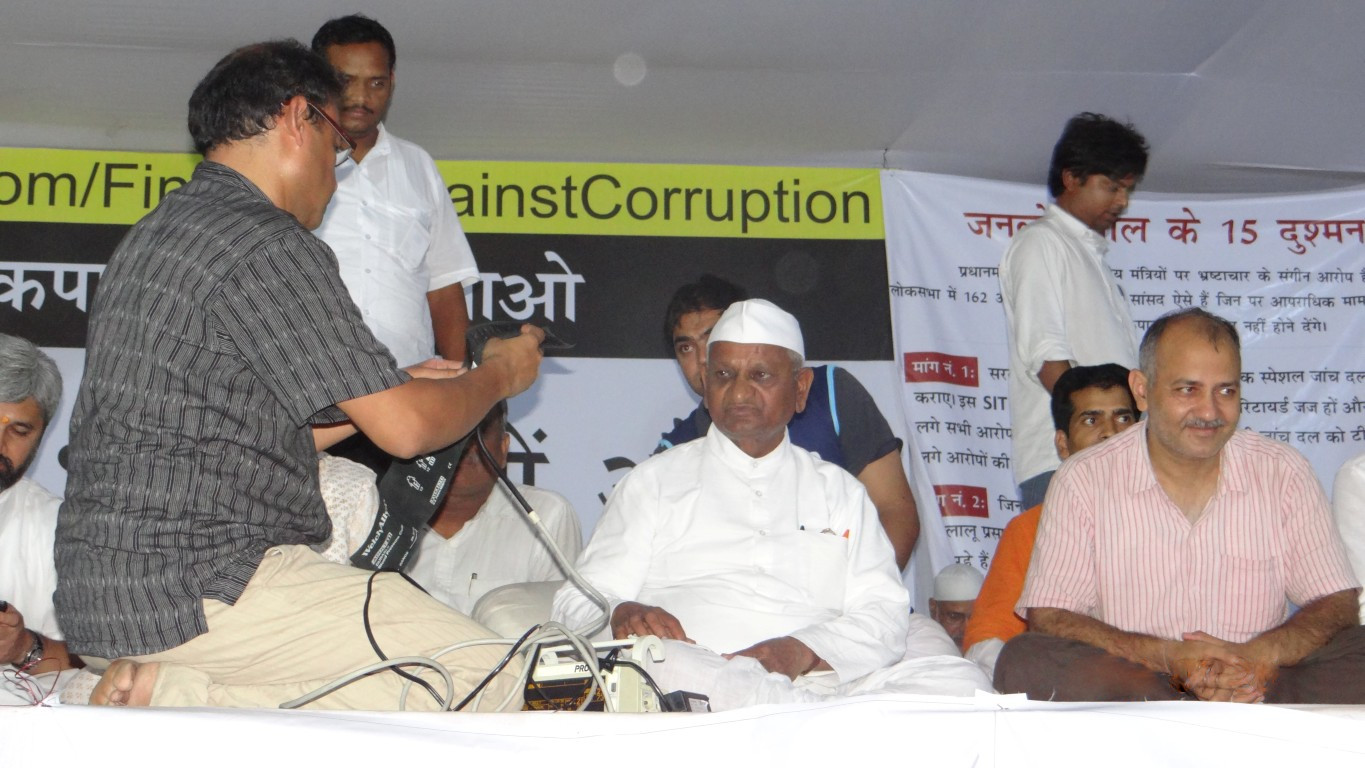
Anna Hazare protesting against corruption

In the "I Have a Dream" speech of Martin Luther King Jr. in 1963, many people standing behind him on stage wore Gandhi caps.

== Re-emergence ==
In 2011, the Gandhi cap once again rose in popularity in India after Anna Hazare, an eminent Gandhian from Maharashtra, started an anti-corruption movement in India. The epicenter of this movement was in Delhi. In August 2011, thousands of people wearing Gandhi caps accumulated at Ramlila Maidan in Delhi to support Anna Hazare on his fast-unto-death. This movement spilled over to many other parts of the country and stadiums, community centers and grounds were booked for assimilation of a similar nature. The mass movement included people of all age groups, religions and social standings (mainly the middle class) as participants, many among them shouting slogans and wearing Gandhi caps.

In the 2014 election, the workers of Aam Aadmi Party widely wore the Gandhi cap with text printed on it.

Supporters of the Bharatiya Janata Party also wear the Gandhi cap but in saffron instead of white.

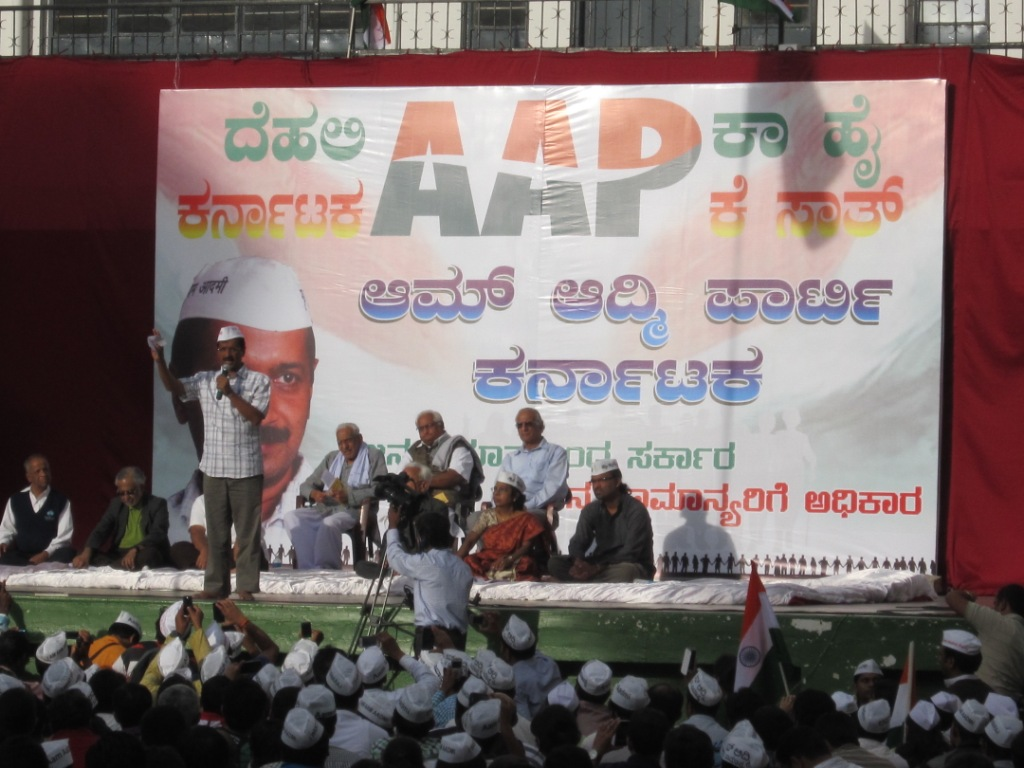
Arvind Kejriwal in Bangalore on inauguration of Aam Aadmi Party Karnataka

== See also ==
- List of hat styles
- Dhaka topi
- Fez (hat)
- Songkok
- Taqiyah (cap)
- Kippah
