= Newar caste system =

Social structure in Nepal and North India

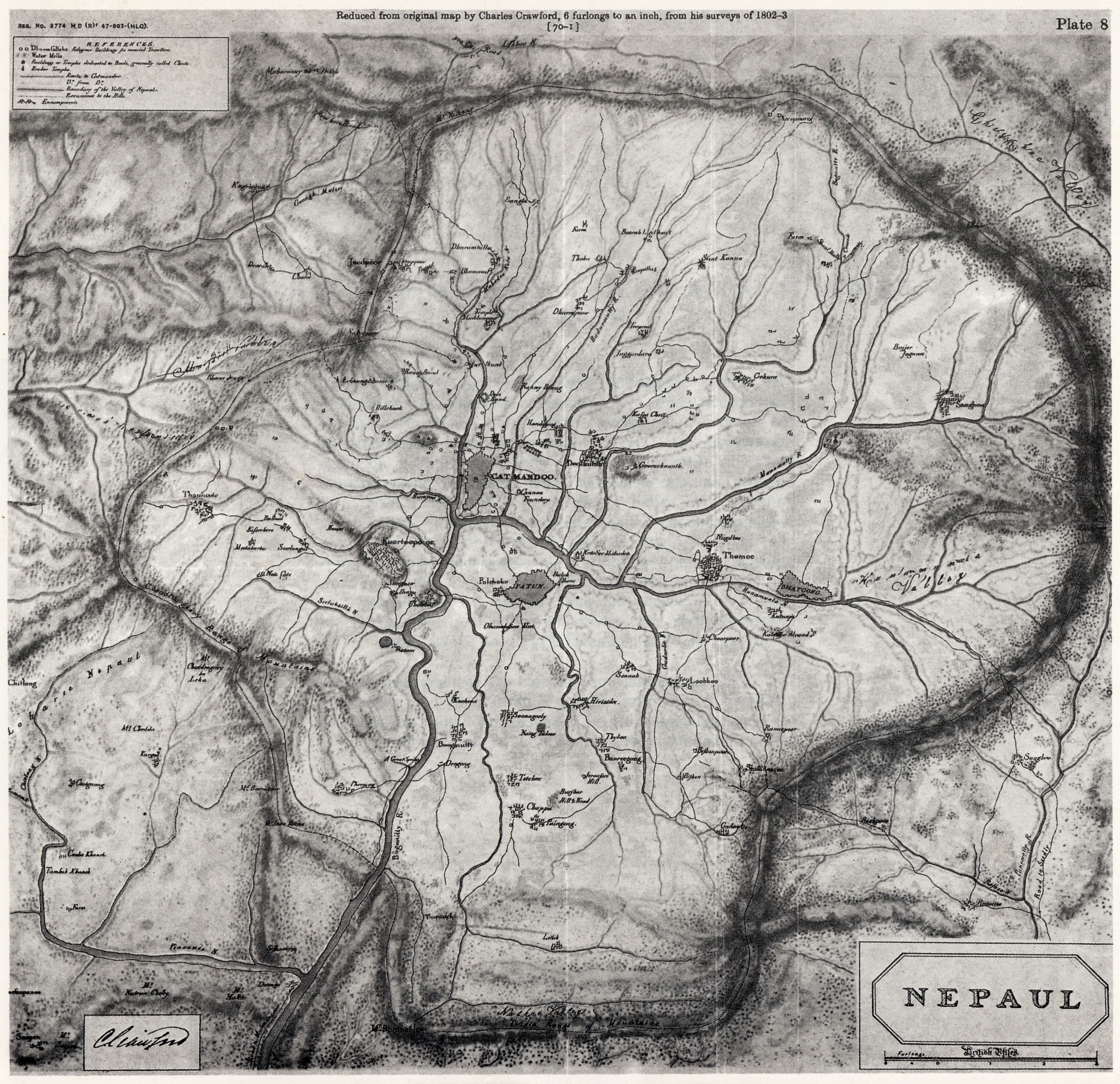
1802 map of Kathmandu Valley and Dolakha Valley

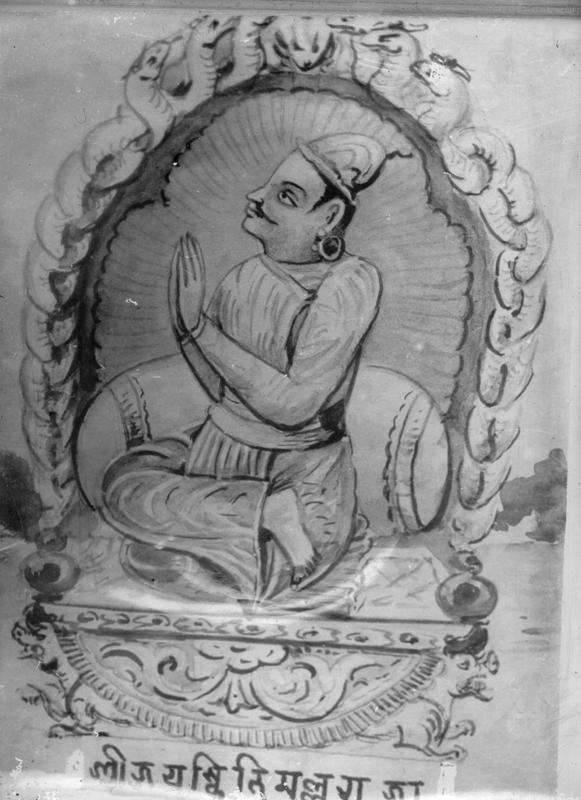
Portrait of Jayasthiti Malla (r. 1382-1395)

Newar caste system is the system by which Newārs, the historical inhabitants of Kathmandu Valley, Nepal, are divided into groups on the basis of Vedic varna model as well as according to their hereditary occupations. First introduced at the time of the Licchavis (A.D. 300 – c. 879), the Newar caste system assumed its present shape during the medieval Malla period (A.D. 1201–1769). The Newar caste structure resembles more closely to North India and Madheshis than that of the Khas 'Parbatiyas' in that all four Varna (Brahmin, Kshatriya, Vaishya and Shudra) and untouchables are represented. The social structure of Newars is unique as it is the last remaining example of a pre-Islamic North Indic civilisation in which Buddhist elements enjoy equal status with the Brahmanic elements.

== History ==
The earliest evidence of a Hindu caste system among the Newar people appear in the Sanskrit language edicts of the Licchavi period (400–879 CE). The scholar KP Malla argues that the edicts show the gradual incorporation of indigenous Newar communities into a Brahmanical social and political order, as well as the Hindu caste system, encouraged through royal patronage, land grants, tax concessions and the expansion of administrative institutions. He identifies that in the edicts of Aṃśuvarma, there are mentions of an institution called the bhaṭṭādhikaraṇa, an institution of Brahmins whose task the edicts specify was to look into cases of dharmaśaṅkara (the abandonment of prescribed occupations). Aṃśuvarma also claimed in his edicts as "the high feudatory Aṃśuvarma, with his fame spread all over the world like a bridge of the unviolated propriety (āryamaryādā)" where Malla argues it refers to the imposition of a caste system.

An inscription issued by Bhīmārjunadeva and Viṣṇugupta in 640 CE granted the inhabitants of a certain village, the permission to wear ornaments other than anklets and bracelets after being pleased with their porter services, with Malla interpreting wearing jewellery as privileges reserved for higher-status groups. The Licchavi king Sivadeva II in his edicts dated 697 and 705 also claim that the king was "the banner of the Licchavi dynasty who thoroughly imposed the caste system".

In contrast, the 19th century chronicles of Nepal, attribute that Newar caste system to a singular monarch, the 14th century king Jayasthiti Malla. The chronicles credit him with dividing the population into numerous hereditary castes, prescribing occupational duties, and regulating dress, ornaments, housing and funerary practices, reportedly with the assistance of five Brahmin scholars.

The historical basis of the alleged reforms has been questioned by Horst Brinkhaus, who found no indication of such legislation in earlier contemporary sources from the Malla period, neither from Jayasthiti Malla himself, nor from any of his descendants. Through an examination of the changing genealogies of the Malla dynasty, Brinkhaus argues that nineteenth-century chroniclers retrospectively enhanced Jayasthiti Malla's reputation as an illustrious royal ancestor, attributing numerous achievements to him, including the establishment of the caste system. Some scholars have allowed for the possibility that Jayasthiti Malla may have codified existing social and occupational arrangements without having introduced caste hierarchy itself. Mary Slusser regarded such a codification as possible, however the extent and historicity of these purported reforms therefore remain disputed.

The anthropologist David Gellner subsequently argued that the attribution of traditional Newar customs to Jayasthiti Malla may have emerged in the late eighteenth and nineteenth centuries as an attempt to legitimize these customs by presenting them as ancient regulations sanctioned by royal authority and Hindu scripture. Gellner also cited Sylvain Lévi who expressed a similar intention for the 19th century chronicles as whole, that they were partly written in order to persuade the new Shah rulers to respect established Newar temples, religious endowments and customary institutions.

The genetic diversity and the cultural ties of Newar with South Asia and East Asia, including Tibet, reflected in their DNA

== Four Varna-Jati within Newars ==
Unlike the Hindu caste systems prevalent in Khas and Madhesi societies, the existence and influence of Buddhist "ex-monks" from ancient times in the Kathmandu Valley added a "double-headed" element to the Newar caste system. While Rājopādhyāya Brahmins (or Déva-bhāju) occupied the highest social position in the Hindu side, the Vajracharya (or Guru/Gu-bhāju) formed the head among the Buddhists. For Hindu Newars, Brahmans had formal precedence with Kshatriyas, which included the royal family and the various groups now known as Srēṣṭha who ran the administration of the Malla courts. For Buddhist Newars, the non-celibate (gr̥hastha) priestly sangha class Vajracharyas and Shakyas ( who are collectively called "Bañdā" or "Baré") were provided with the highest position. In Kathmandu, they were followed by a lay patron Buddhist caste of Urāy, or Upasakas, who specialized in the trade with Tibet. Therefore, the Hindu Rajopadhyaya Brahmins and Buddhist Vajracharyas occupy the highest position in Newar society. This is followed by the Hindu Kshatriya nobility (Chatharīya Srēṣṭha) and the Vaishya merchant and traders castes. The Newar varna logic as stratified from the Hindu Brahmanic perspective place Shakya-Baré, Urāy among the Buddhists, and Pāncthariya Srēṣṭha, and other groups above the Jyapus among the Hindus among the dwija twice-born status as the core Vaishya castes of Newars who are highly specialized in trade and commerce.

These three varnas (Brahman, Kshatriya, Vaishya) and castes of either religious identity inside their respective Varna (Hindu Rājopādhyāya/Chatharīya/Pānchtharīya and Buddhist Vajrāchārya/Shākya/Urāy) collectively form the upper-caste twice-born segment of Newar society. Their upper status is maintained by their exclusive entitlement to secret Tantric initiation rites (āgama and diksha rituals) which cannot be conducted on castes other than the three upper varnas. Along with this, their higher status also requires them to conduct additional life-cycle (saṃskāra) ceremonies like the sacred-thread wearing ceremony upanayana (for Rājopādhyāyas and Chatharīyas) or the rites of baréchyégu or āchāryabhisheka (for Vajracharyas and Shakyas). Higher castes are supposed to be 'more pure' because they celebrate more ceremonies and observe more rites of purification and because events such as births and death defile them for longer periods of time than they do Jyāpu agriculturists and other service providers. Srēṣṭhas also maintain their superior status over others with the claim that they firmly belong to the mainstream Brahmanic Aryan-Hindu lineage than the Jyāpu and others, and are in much more intimate contact with the Brahmans. Because of their high social status, these upper-level castes have also traditionally formed the core of the land-owning gentry and as patrons to all other caste groups.

The distinction between Hindu and Buddhist is largely irrelevant from the castes occupying the Shudra varna (Jyapu and below) as they generally do not differentiate between the either and profess both the religions equally and with great fervour. This group include among them highly differentiated and specialized castes—agriculturalists, farmers, potters, painters, dyers, florists, butchers, tailors, cleaners, etc.—métiers needed in the daily lives of the Newars or for their cultural or ritual needs. The division into Hindu and Buddhist castes has not been regarded by Newars as a serious cleavage since both groups share the same basic values and social practices and are in close accord with their underlying religious philosophy. Majority of the Newars, in fact, participate in many of the observances of both religions.

The Newar castes, Buddhist as well as Hindu, are no less pollution-conscious than the Khas and the Madhesis. Caste endogamy, however, which has been one of the main methods of maintaining status in India, is not strictly observed in Nepal by either the Newars or the Khas. The strictest rules governing the relations between members of different castes are those pertaining to marriage and commensality. Boiled rice and dal (a sauce made of lentils), in particular, must not be accepted from a person of lower caste. Other rules further restrict social intermingling between the castes, but they tend to be treated more casually.

== Advent of Khas/Gorkhali rulers and the Muluki Ain ==
The most successful attempt at imposing the caste system was made in the 19th century by Jung Bahadur Kunwar who was very keen to have his own status raised. He became the first of the Ranas and his task was to establish the legitimacy of Ranas and secure his control over the land. He succeeded in introducing the caste system to a much greater degree and rigidity than Jayasthitimalla, the Malla king had done just over five hundred years before him. With the advent of Khas domination since Nepal's unification by Prithvi Narayan Shah in 1769 A.D. the center of power shifted from the Newar noble families to these power and land hungry rural nobility whose core values were concentration of power at home and conquest abroad.

After the takeover of power by the Khas rulers, Newars as a block were reduced to the status of an occupied subject race, and except for a loyal family or two, they were stripped of their social status and economic foothold. Even Newar Brahmins who had been serving as priests for Newars lost ritual status to the "Hill Brahman", the Parbate Bahuns, of the Khas people community. Even the old military-administrative caste of the Śreṣṭha was largely reduced to 'Matwali' status, and were barred from joining high military and administrative posts for a long period of time. The last Newar noble to hold some power, Kaji Tribhuvan Pradhan, was beheaded in a court intrigue in 1806 A.D. Newars were generally not admitted in the civil service until 1804 A.D, after which only a handful of Newars were admitted in the higher administration. These notable exceptions came from the Kshatriya-status Chatharīya clans like the Pradhan, Rajbhandari, Joshi, Malla/Pradhananga, among others, who did reach high administrative and military positions in the new Gorkhali administration. Even though Gorkhalis saw them as part of the 'defeated' aristocracy of the Malla kingdoms, they went on to form the core of the ruling administrative elite of the new Nepali state till the end of Rana regime in 1951 A.D.

Irrespective of the Newars' own complex and much more elaborate social stratification, the legal code "Muluki Ain", promulgated in January 1854 A.D. by the new Rana regime, classified the entire Newar community as a single "enslavable alcohol-drinking" caste. It was in 1863 A.D. that majority of the Newars were upgraded to "non-enslaveable" category, after Jung Bahadur's content at Newars' administration of public offices during the Indian Rebellion of 1857. The most drastic change came only as late as 1935 A.D. during Juddha Shamsher's reign when amendments were made in the old legal code as a result of years of lobbying that granted the Rajopadhyayas the status of Upadhyaya Brahmans, and the Chatharīya Śreṣṭha the status of "pure" Kshatriya, enlisting these two Newar castes in the pan-Nepal tagadhari caste of "dwija" status.

Newars were not admitted in the army till 1951 A.D. - the year when the festival of Indra Jatra discontinued to be celebrated as "the Victory Day" — commemorating the conquest of the valley by the Gorkhali army. Economically, the position of the Newars was weakened by the diversion of Tibet trade from the Chumbi Valley route since 1850s A.D. and the competition with the Marwaris became all the stiffer since the end of the World War I. Although Jung Bahadur and his descendants were well disposed to a few clientele Newar families, the 104 years of their family rule was not a golden age of Newar social history. It was only those clientele Newar families patronized by the Ranas who succeeded in upgrading their social and economic status by imitating new norms of the Rana Durbar. The Chatharīya, for example, succeeded in producing the required social credentials to prove that the Chatharīya tharghar (families of noble extraction, and referred to as "asal Srestha") alone were "pure" Kshatriyas, where as similar claims by other Newar castes (most notably by the Khadgis) were not successful.

As a consequence, among the Newars, caste has become more complex and stratified than among the non-Newar group. This latter group may consider all Newar people to be equally Matwali, essentially placing all upper-caste Newars in the Vaishya varna and lower-caste Newars among the clean Shudras, but this has never been the perception of the Newars themselves, especially among high-caste Newars.

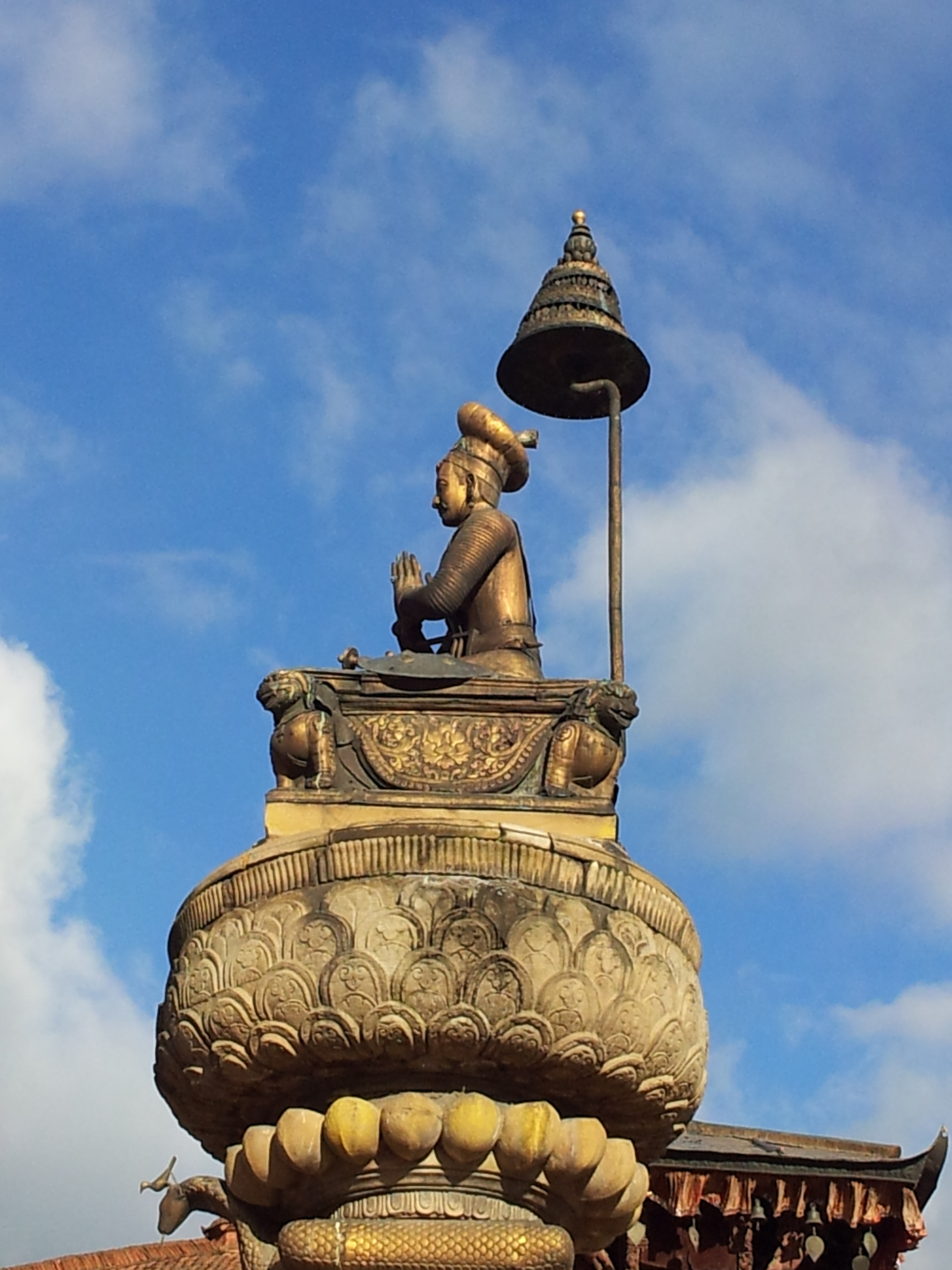
Statue of King Bhupatindra Malla at Bhaktapur Durbar Square

== Historical relation to other non-Newar Nepalis ==
Historically, Newars in general divided non-Newar Nepalis into three general groups: Sae(n), Khae(n), Marsyā.

Mongoloid people, thought generally to have Tibetan connections, are called "Sae(n)" This term is said to be derived from an old Newari term for a Tibetan or, according to some, for Lhasa. This term has also been traditionally used as synonymous to the Tamangs whose habitat has been the surrounding areas of the Valley. Magars were largely associated with the Gorkhali invaders and were given equivalent or similar status to that of the Khas Chhetri. All other hill or mountain Mongoloid groups would have been generally placed in caste-status accorded to the "Sae(n)".

For the hill Khas tribe of the west who were in large part associated with the Gorkhali invaders, the term Partyā or Parbaté meaning hill-dweller is used in polite reference. The ordinary term, considered pejorative, is "Khae(n)" derived from their tribal designation Khas. This general term refers in some contexts only to the upper-status divisions of the western Khas group, the Bahun (Khae(n) Barmu) and the Chhetri (Khae(n)) but in other contexts may also include the low status (generally untouchable) occupational Khas groups such as Damāi (tailors), Sārki (shoemakers and leather workers). Furthermore, other non-Mongoloid hill groups who may be of dubious historical Khas connections, such as the Gaine, are included as Khae(n).

The southern plains Terai dwellers who are referred as Marsyā, which is a colloquial corruption of the word Madhesiyā. The Madhesiyā population have a history of being embraced by the Newar population. Historic records show that Maithil Brahmin and Kānyakubja Brahmin were invited by various Malla kings as their royal priests and advisors. It is widely believed that the present Rajopadhyaya Brahmins are the descendants of those immigrant groups. Similarly, Madhesi royal clans including Malla themselves and their courtier castes like Kayastha, Hada, Chauhan, Chandel, Vaidhya, Rajput, etc. migrated into Kathmandu Valley in the 14th century and ruled as Malla kings and their nobility, who have since coalesced to form the current Chatharīya (Kshatriya) caste. Historical records also show trading, service, and untouchable clans of the Indian plains immigrating to Nepal Valley along with the entourage of the Maithil and Malla kings, and in due process, becoming Newars themselves. Some of them includes Dusadh/Podhya, Jogi/Jugi/Kapali, Dhobi/Dhobi, Mali/Mālākar, Halwai/Rajkarnikar, Teli/Manandhar/Sāyami, Kumhar/Kumhā/Prajapati, Chamar/Chyamah, among others.

For Newar Brahmans, Khae Bahuns and Chetris were only water-acceptable. The Chatharīya and Pañcthariya accepted water and all foods except boiled rice and lentils from them. Jyapu and lower clean occupational groups accepted water as well as boiled rice and lentils from them. Conversely, those Khas groups untouchable to the upper Khas groups themselves were also untouchable for the Newars. The Sae(n) were generally treated as water-unacceptable by Newar Brahmans. The Chatharīya and strict Pañcthariya accepted water (but not boiled and salted foods) from them. Most, but not all, Jyapu accepted all food except boiled rice and lentils from them. The residual group, neither Khae(n) nor Sae(n), are Muslims and Westerners and these were generally treated as untouchable by the highest levels, and water-unacceptable by those below them.

For the higher Parbatiya castes (Bahuns and Chetris), the highest twice-born Hindu Newar castes (Brahmans and Chatharīyas, and occasionally Pañcthariyas) existed in a kind of "separate but parallel" status of Tāgādhāri with respect to the high caste Parbatiya. The remaining castes all fell under the rubric of "matwali" or liquor-drinking groups. From the Khas Brahman-Chhetri point of view, this large middle-ranking group includes the remaining Newar castes and other Tibeto-Burman speaking peoples. Members of this group are touchable and water acceptable. Similarly, Newar untouchables and the clearly water-unacceptable but touchable groups were also untouchable or water-unacceptable to the Khas Brahmans and Chetris.

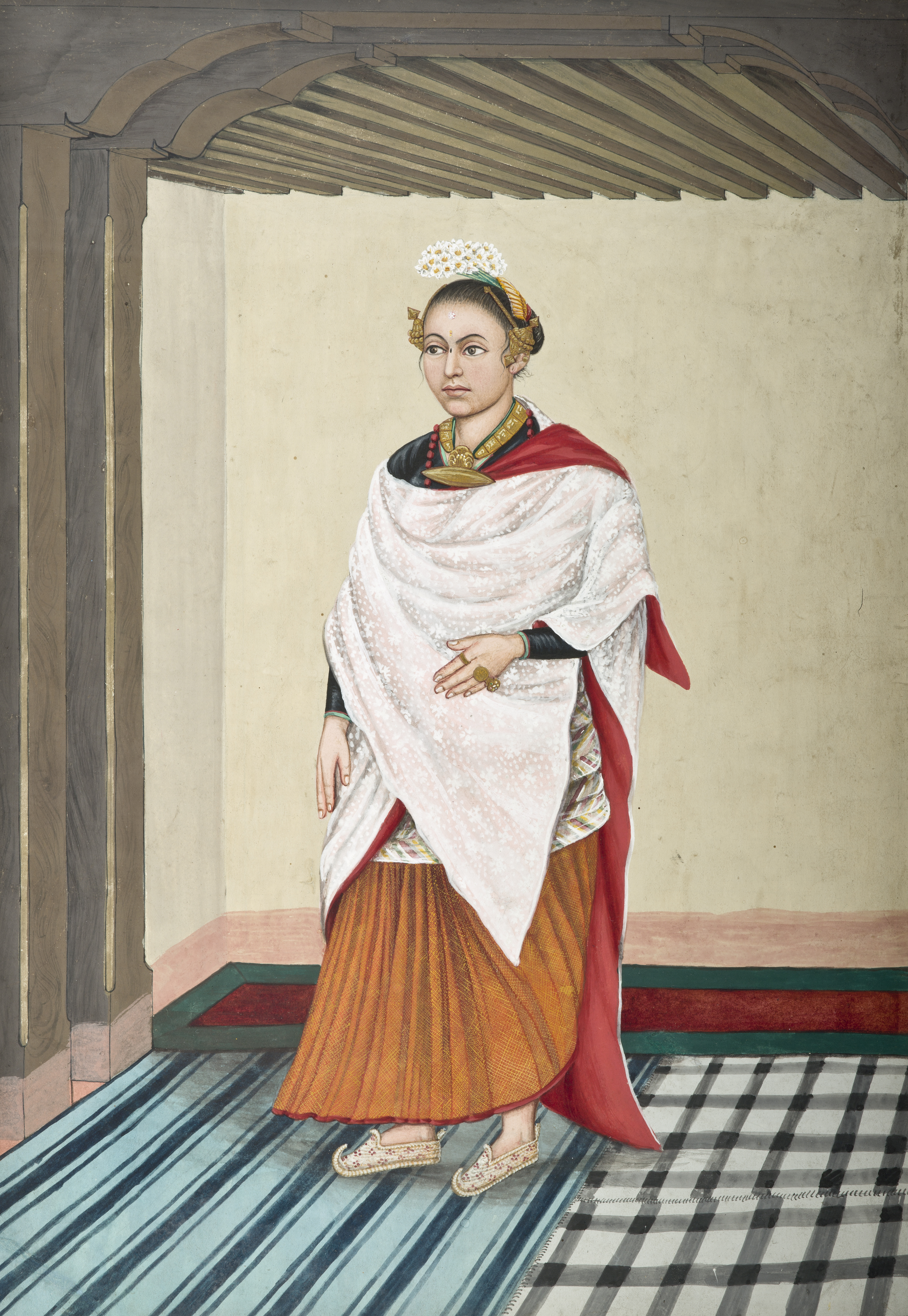
An aristocratic Newar woman in parsi, circa 1860–1900

== Inside the castes ==
=== Hindu Newar ===
==== Rājopādhyāya Brahmins ====
Rājopādhyāya Kānyakubja Brahmins are on top of the Hindu Newar social hierarchy. Referred to as 'Deva Brahman'(God Brahmin) or colloquially as 'Dyah Baje'(God Grandfather) or as 'Upadhyaya' (teacher), these Brahmins with surnames Rajopadhyaya, Sharma, Acharya, among others, serve as family priest (purohit) primarily to the Hindu Srēṣṭha clans. They also serve as the Vedic temple priests of some of the most important temples of the Vaishnav sect, including Krishna Mandir and the four cardinal Vishnu temples of Kathmandu Valley; Changu Narayan, Sesh Narayan, Bishankhu Narayan, and Ichanghu Narayan. They also serve as chief priests of the three Taleju Bhawani temples, the ista-devi of Mallas, the Kumbeshvar temple, among others. The Rajopadhyayas speak Newari language and were historically the raj-purohitas and gurus of the Licchavi and Malla kings. They claim descent from Kanyakubja Brahmins, one of the five Pancha-Gauda North Indian Brahmin groupings, are divided among four exogamous lineage gotras- Bharadwaj, Kaushik, Garga and Kaundinya, and their history shows their presence in the Kathmandu valley as early as 4th CE. The Rajopadhyayas still keep a strong tradition of Vedic rituals alive, a fact exemplified for instance at the recent Lakhhōma and Ashvamedha performed with contributions of the whole town of Bhaktapur. The Brahmins are higher in caste status than the king not because they are more powerful, but because of their superior ritual status. The Brahmins were like all other specialized service providers, except that they were considered higher to others in ritual purity.

==== Maithil Brahmins and Bhatta Brahmins ====
Maithil Brahmins or colloquially Jha Bajey with surnames Jhā and Miśra serve as temple priests and are later additions to the Newar nation, their population being slightly less than that of the Rajopadhyaya Brahmins. Most notably, these Maithil Brahmins claim descent from the time of the 1324 A.D. migration of the Maithil-Karnata King Hari Simha Deva from Simraungadh along with other notable clans like the Chatharīyas. Some also claim to have been descended from those Brahmins who came to Nepal as late as 17th CE as respected guests and royal priests of the Malla kings. They speak Newari, follow most Newar traditions, and also serve as temple priests and as purohits for some middle-ranking Newar castes. Bhatta Brahmins too are much more recent additions to the social fabric of Kathmandu, having their origins from Maharashtra and Gujarat. Most notably, king Pratap Malla is said to have invited these priests into his court as they were highly learned and specialized in Tantra. In time, they started working as priests of lesser important temples, but never integrated among the existing Brahmin classes. There also exists a separate class of Pancha-Dravida Bhatta Brahmins who are chief priests of the Pashupatinath Temple who are unrelated to these Bhattas.

Unlike the Rajopadhyaya Brahmins, most Newars do not consider the Maithil and Bhatta Brahmins as being true Newar or as their Newar Brahmins, and accord them with lower caste-status than the Rajopadhyayas. Maithil and Bhatta Brahmins do not consider themselves as 'true' Newars either because unlike the Rajopadhyayas, they claim that their arrival to the Nepal Valley is much more recent, and they have always maintained matrimonial and ceremonial ties (as in the case of Maithil Brahmins) with the Terai, never fully integrating in the Newar social fabric.

==== Shrēṣṭha ====
Srēṣṭha or colloquially Sya:sya is the immediate second-ranking group among Shivamargi (Hindu) Newars. They are the most dominant Newar caste that includes the old Newari aristocracy as well as the traditional land-owning and mercantile families. Within the Sresthas there are three hierarchically ranked, traditionally endogamous groups which describe themselves as i. Kshatriya or colloquially Chatharīya, ii. Pañchthariya, and iii. Chārtharīya. Among them, only the Chatharīya and Pañchthariya are the two historically accepted and renowned social classes among the Srēṣṭha themselves. Despite the varna and endogamous caste differences between Chatharīya and Pañchthariya from the inside, non-Srēṣṭhas often tend to see them as a singular composite unit from the outside. They accord both the groups with the collective status of 'Srēṣṭha' or 'Sya:sya' because of their common socio-cultural and upper-caste and class identifier as the chief landlord/patron Hindu group.

- Chatharīya or sometimes shortened to Chatharī are the high-caste, aristocratic Sresthas and the clans within this group correspond as Kshatriya varna, and they claim descent from Suryavansha, Chandravansha, and Agnivansha houses of Kshatriya kings from the south, most of whom entered Nepal Valley with the advent of Muslim conquerors in the Indian subcontinent from 11th-13th century, and indeed many trace their roots to Malla and Karnat royalty or the nobility during the Malla era. Many scholars argue that the local term "Chatharīya" is a corruption of the word "Kshatriya", the traditional warrior and ruling class of traditional Hindu societies. They formed the core of the ruling, administrative and noble class of the Nepal Valley until the demise of the Malla dynasty in the 18th century. They usually do not call themselves "Shrestha", and rather use their family or clan titles, the main ones being- Pradhan, Malla, Pradhananga, Amatya, Joshi, Karmacharya, Hada, Vaidya, Maskey, Rajvanshi, Rajbhandari, Nemkul, Rajlawat, Kayastha, etc. All these clans presently have Kshatriya status, share a number of exogamous lineage and gotras and inter-marry between themselves. Additionally, Chatharīya and the Rajopadhyaya Brahmins are the only two Newar castes entitled to wear the sacred thread (Janeu) in the upanayana ceremony, and are given the status of tagadhari in the larger Nepali social milieu.

Included among the Chathariyas, the Acharya or Achaju (alternatively Karmacharya, Guruacharya) and the Joshi hold prominent and respected position in the Newar society as ritual specialists and non-Brahmin priests. Karmacharyas serve as traditional Tantric priests of Taleju, the guardian deity of the Malla kings, as well as various other Tantric temples of Kathmandu valley. They also serve as assistant priests to Rajopadhyayas in ritual ceremonies like the Śrāddha ceremony of Chathariyas and Panchtahriyas. The Joshis serve as the astrologers as well as assistant non-Brahmin priests in various ritual functions. Despite their occupational work linking them to priestly, albeit non-Vedic, work both Karmacharyas/Achajus and Joshis however are seen as "degraded" Brahmins due to their lack of Brahmanical percepts and fall ritually as Kshatriya, and hence inter-marry with other Chathariyas. Joshis and Karmacharyas are also seen as Kshatriya status off-springs of widow Brahman and Brahman-Srēṣṭha, and Brahman-Vaishya marriages respectively.

- Pañchthariya are those who have been drawn from multiple economic and social backgrounds, especially from successful mercantile and commercial families. Although the Chathariya traditionally saw them as belonging to the Vaishya varna and avoided matrimonial ties with them, Pachathariya themselves as well as those lower in the hierarchy did not distinguish them from the Chathariya, and hence saw the Panchthariya as part of the larger Shrestha class, hence among the Kshatriya varna, this however is disputed by the Chathariya themselves as well as by the Rajopadhyaya Brahmans. Unlike the Chathariya who usually write their specific clan names, Panchthariya Shresthas generally opt to write "Shrestha" instead of their traditional family clan names that indicate their specific occupations. Panchthariyas also include Srēṣṭhas from traditional mercantile towns like Thimi, Dhulikhel, Banepa, and outside the three royal-towns of Kathmandu, Patan, Bhaktapur. This caste also include those Chathariya clans and families whose caste-status have been lowered as a result of mixed-caste progeny or other means that effectively lowered the caste status from Chathariya. Higher Chathariya clans have also seen Panchthariya as an effective buffer between themselves and those coming from effective hyepergamous traditions of many lower-status groups who may want to be accepted in the Srēṣṭha-status.
- Chārtharīya Shrestha are even lowered in the social status and consists of those from non-Srestha background who try to emulate or establish the Srestha (Chatharīya and Pañchthariya) status by pretending their norms or simply, in many cases, adopting the general caste-denoting surname like 'Shrestha' or in other instances Joshi, 'Singh', 'Achaju', or 'Pradhan'. Pañchthariya and especially Chatharīya reject the claims of such pretensions and prevent caste endogamy and commonality with such groups. To these historically established and upper Srestha ranks, Chārtharīya's efforts remain unacknowledged and hence are not counted among the Srestha fold.

==== Jyāpu ====
Jyāpu group, consisting of several sub-castes or clan- Maharjan, Dangol, Sangha (Sangat), Awale, Suwāl, Ngakhusi, Duwal, Singh, Kumha/Prajāpati, Khusa/Tandukār, etc. and form close to 45% of the entire Newar population. Exclusive religious preference largely disappears from this occupational caste which consists of people who numerically form the majority population among the Newars —the farmers and agriculturalists— and are collectively called the Jyapu. Notable exception of the religious syncretism is that of the Bhaktapur Jyapus who maintain their exclusive affiliation to Hinduism and invite the Rajopadhyaya as their purohit, where as most Kathmandu and Lalitpur Jyapus invite the Vajracharya. Jyapu literally means "competent worker" in Nepal Bhasa language. They have provided significant contribution to Nepali society and have been seen as the backbone of the Newar community. They are believed to be the true descendants of the various original settlers of the Kathmandu Valley—Licchavis, Ahirs, Kirata, Gopalas. Among others, the Jyapus were turned into Shudra class-caste category during the Malla period. But the Jyapus remained united and never allowed themselves to be pushed into the position of serfdom of slavery as many non-Hindu tribes in the plains were forced to do. They had a long history and strong internal social organization. They have been in control of the important means of production, namely the agricultural land, for generations. Jyapus are among the most progressive farmers in Nepal. Today, Jyapus have succeeded in placing themselves at the centre of Newar society, thanks partly to the growing popularity of the Indigenous adivasi discourse. Today, they picture themselves as the most genuine Newars, the epitome of their society and culture. Through their community organisations, they increasingly speak on behalf of all Newars.

==== Ek-thariya ====
Ek-thariya caste groups include over 12 specialized hereditary occupational caste groups who also follow syncretic Hindu-Buddhist religion. Sāyami (Manandhar), Kāu (Nakarmi), Nāu (Nāpit), Chitrakār, Ranjitkar, Balami, among others. Further down the caste hierarchy, caste groups like the Dhobi (Rajak), Kapali, Dom/Kulu, Podhya and Chama:khala were previously regarded as "water-unacceptable" or "untouchable" groups, part of the socially and economically marginalized groups with their own set of priests, rituals and a culture apart.

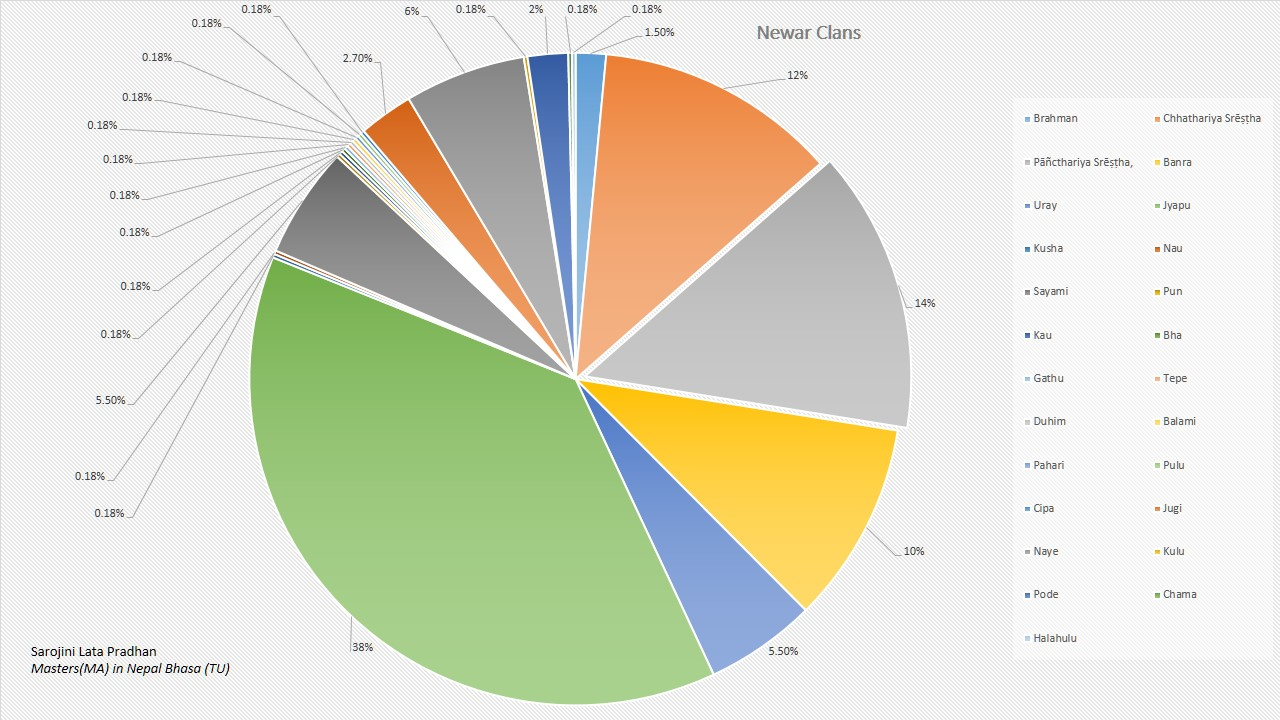
Newar Caste Groups

=== Buddhamargi ===
Similarly, the Buddhamargi castes can be broadly divided into four major groups, viz. Gubhāju-Baré, Urāy, Jyāpu, and the Ektharīya. Of these four groups, the first two form the core of the Buddhamargi Newars.

==== Gubhāju-Baré/Bañdā ====
Gubhāju-Baré/Bañdā, consists of two sub-groups, Gubhajus or Vajrachāryas (‘Master of the Diamond [Way]’, i.e. Tantric preceptor) and Barés or Śākyas formerly called Śākyabhikṣu (‘Buddhist monk’) or Śākyavaṃśa (‘of the Śākya’s, i.e. the Buddha’s, lineage’). The Vajrachāryas and Śākyas form the priestly functionaries.

The Vajrācāryas are placed at the top of the hierarchy among the Buddhamargi Newars. They are the purohits or family priests. A special subgroup of the Gubhaju is called Buddhacharya who are traditional priests of Swayambhunath temple, the most sacred temple for Buddhamargis. The Shakyas, who are next to the Vajracharyas in the caste hierarchy, can also be called Vihar priests. Along with the Vajrācāryas, Shakyas have the right of hereditary membership of the bahas or viharas. However, while the Vajracharyas' exclusive occupation is priesthood, the Shakyas follow the hereditary occupation of goldsmiths.

==== Urāy ====
Urāy or Udās, consists of nine main subgroups, viz Tuladhar, Bania, Kansakar, Tamo (Tamrakar), Sthapit, Shikhrakar, Silakār, Selālik, Sindurākār etc. The Urāy/Udas group is composed of the castes of hereditary merchants and artisans. The name 'Uray' is said to have been derived from the Sanskrit term "upāsaka" meaning "devout layman". They are a prominent community in the business and cultural life of Kathmandu and have played key roles in the development of trade, industry, art, architecture, literature, and Buddhism in Nepal and the Himalayan region. Some Udasas, like the Tuladhars, are among the most prosperous and wealthy people in Nepal, and used to have property interests in places like Lhasa, Darjeeling, Kalimpong and various other trade centres outside Nepal. They were the primary carriers of trade between Nepal and Tibet.

== Marriage customs ==
Marriage is, as a rule, patrilocal and monogamous. The parents traditionally arrange marriages for their sons and daughters, although, with the modernization of Nepali society, an increasing number of young people choose their own partners.

Among the Shresthas, since they are subdivided into two general sub-castes, the higher Chatharīya and the lower Pāñcthariya, one's marriage partner must be from the same grade as well. Hindu upper-castes like Rajopadhyayas and Chatharīyas also try to avoid "Sa-Gotra" marriages; marrying someone of the same gotra or lineage. Traditional families also get advice from family Jyotishi/Joshi for horoscope match-making. For most Newars, partners must belong to different descent-group lineages within the same caste. In some areas the rule of "seven generations" of descent is observed; members who fall within the common descent group of seven generations are restricted from intermarriage.

Buddhist Newars living in a baha—a residential quadrangle around a central court with Buddhist shrines and temples—consider themselves to be of common descent, making intermarriage a taboo.

== Caste groups ==
Below is a list of over 24 Newar castes, their sub-caste groups and clans, along with their traditional occupations and the most common surnames in their respective hierarchical positions. Also listed is the approximate percentages of the major castes of Newars sampled within Kathmandu Valley.

Caste (jāt)	Traditional occupation	Clan titles (kul) or surnames (thar)	Notes
1. Brāhman; Shivamargi (1%)	Hindu family purohit and Vedic temple priests	Rajopādhyāya, Sharmā, Achārya	Referred to as Dhya Bājyā or Déva Brāhman, temple priests and family priests of mostly Valley Hindu Srēṣṭhas
2. Chatharīya (Kshatriya) Srēṣṭha; Shivamargi (11%)	also Thako͞o/Thakur/Thakuri (Malla dynastic lineage and nobles) Chathariya (Nobility, courtier and administrative clans) also referred as Chatharī / Kshatri / Asal-Srestha (Royal and aristocratic clans, also includes astrologers & Shakta priests)	Malla, Pradhānanga, Pradhān, Pātravanshi, Raghuvanshi, Rājbanshi, etc.	Referred to as Thako͞o/Thakuri, of Malla-Karnat descent, royalty/nobility
2. Chatharīya (Kshatriya) Srēṣṭha; Shivamargi (11%)	also Thako͞o/Thakur/Thakuri (Malla dynastic lineage and nobles) Chathariya (Nobility, courtier and administrative clans) also referred as Chatharī / Kshatri / Asal-Srestha (Royal and aristocratic clans, also includes astrologers & Shakta priests)	Rathore/Amātya, Rājbhandāri, Rājkool, Rāwal, Onta/Wanta, Vaidya, Maskey, Māthémā, Timilā, Mulmi, Nemkul, traditional Chathariya-status Shrestha from Patan, etc.	Aristocratic clans, Mahāpātra courtiers
2. Chatharīya (Kshatriya) Srēṣṭha; Shivamargi (11%)	also Thako͞o/Thakur/Thakuri (Malla dynastic lineage and nobles) Chathariya (Nobility, courtier and administrative clans) also referred as Chatharī / Kshatri / Asal-Srestha (Royal and aristocratic clans, also includes astrologers & Shakta priests)	Joshi, Daivagya Karmāchārya, Guruwāchārya of Kathmandu or Āchārju (Acharya-jyu)	Astrologers, also courtiers Shakta priests of Taleju, Guhyeshwari temples
2. Chatharīya (Kshatriya) Srēṣṭha; Shivamargi (11%)	also Thako͞o/Thakur/Thakuri (Malla dynastic lineage and nobles) Chathariya (Nobility, courtier and administrative clans) also referred as Chatharī / Kshatri / Asal-Srestha (Royal and aristocratic clans, also includes astrologers & Shakta priests)	Other Chathariya from Bhaktapur - Rājbhandāri (Bhadel, Bhandāri, Dhaubhadél), Rathore (Gwanga/Gongol, Amātya, Ojhathachhéñ, Piyā, Mulepāti, Mool), Chauhan (Hādā/Bijukchhé), Chandel (Maskey, Dhoñju, Joñchhén, Munankarmi, Palikhél), Kāyastha (Kasaju), etc.	Courtiers and administrators
3. Pāñcthariya (Vaishya) Srēṣṭha; Shivamargi (10%)	Hindu traders and administrators	Karmāchārya/Āchāju, Sivachārya (Tini) of Bhaktapur	Tantric priests
3. Pāñcthariya (Vaishya) Srēṣṭha; Shivamargi (10%)	Hindu traders and administrators	Maka/Makaju, Madhi:kami, Dhaubanjar, Batās, Bhādra, Chuké, Kakshapati, Kolākshapati, Banepāli, Sonepa, Deoju, Sāhukhala, Sāhu, Sākha, Ulak, etc., and outside Valley Shrestha	Traders and merchants; Panchthariyas of Bhaktapur
3. Pāñcthariya (Vaishya) Srēṣṭha; Shivamargi (10%)	Hindu traders and administrators	Bagha:(half) Shrestha, Badé Shrestha, Thapa Shrestha	Panchthariya Shresthas of Thimi; Offsprings of Chathariya and non-Chathariya unions placed in Bagha:Shrestha
3. Pāñcthariya (Vaishya) Srēṣṭha; Shivamargi (10%)	Hindu traders and administrators	Malla Khacharā, Thaku, Rajlawat	Malla of mixed-caste unions; Thaku are descendants of pre-Malla Vaishya-Thakuris
3. Pāñcthariya (Vaishya) Srēṣṭha; Shivamargi (10%)	Hindu traders and administrators	Bhandāri/Bhāri/Tālchābhadél of Changu, Shrestha of Banepa, Dhulikhel, Dolakha, Panauti	Traders and merchants
1. Gubhāju; 2. Bañdā/Baréju; Buddhamargi (11%)	Gubhāju (Buddhist family purohit) Baréju (Buddhist temple priests), Craftsmen	Vajrachārya	Referred to as Gubhāju or Guruju; family priests of Buddhist Newars; also temple priests
1. Gubhāju; 2. Bañdā/Baréju; Buddhamargi (11%)	Gubhāju (Buddhist family purohit) Baréju (Buddhist temple priests), Craftsmen	Shākya	Referred to as Baréju; Temple priests and traditional gold and silversmiths. Sub-clans include Dhakwā, Buddhācharya, Bhikshu
3. Urāy, Udās; Buddhamargi (4%)	Buddhist traders, artisans/craftsmen from Kathmandu	Tulādhar	Merchants
3. Urāy, Udās; Buddhamargi (4%)	Buddhist traders, artisans/craftsmen from Kathmandu	Bānia	Merchants
3. Urāy, Udās; Buddhamargi (4%)	Buddhist traders, artisans/craftsmen from Kathmandu	Sika:mi (Sthapit)	Woodworkers, carpenters, masons
3. Urāy, Udās; Buddhamargi (4%)	Buddhist traders, artisans/craftsmen from Kathmandu	Tamot/Tāmrakār	Copper-smiths
3. Urāy, Udās; Buddhamargi (4%)	Buddhist traders, artisans/craftsmen from Kathmandu	Kansakar	Bronze-smiths
3. Urāy, Udās; Buddhamargi (4%)	Buddhist traders, artisans/craftsmen from Kathmandu	Sikhrākār	Roofers
3. Urāy, Udās; Buddhamargi (4%)	Buddhist traders, artisans/craftsmen from Kathmandu	Shilpakār	Wood-carvers, statuemakers
3. Urāy, Udās; Buddhamargi (4%)	Buddhist traders, artisans/craftsmen from Kathmandu	Selālik	Confectioners
3. Urāy, Udās; Buddhamargi (4%)	Buddhist traders, artisans/craftsmen from Kathmandu	Shilākār	Stone-carvers
4. Pengu Dah (the 'four' groups) (3%)	Artisans/Craftsmen from Patan	Tāmrakar, locally called Tamo	Copper-smiths, Hindu, as opposed to Udas Tamrakars of Kathmandu
4. Pengu Dah (the 'four' groups) (3%)	Artisans/Craftsmen from Patan	Rajkarnikar/Halwāi, locally called Marikahmi	Sweetmakers. Participate in Samyak Mahadan by making confections.
4. Pengu Dah (the 'four' groups) (3%)	Artisans/Craftsmen from Patan	Sthāpit/Bārāhi or Kāsthakār/Shilpakār, locally called Sikahmi	Carpenters, Rato Matsyendranath chariot builders
4. Pengu Dah (the 'four' groups) (3%)	Artisans/Craftsmen from Patan	Shilpakār or Shilākār, locally called Lwahākahmi	Stonemasons, wood-carvers
5. Jyāpu (~44%)	Farmers	5.1 Maharjan, Dangol, Sangha(Sangat)	Majority population in Kathmandu, Lalitpur, Bungamati, Kirtipur
5. Jyāpu (~44%)	Farmers	5.2 Singh, Suwal, Ngakhusi, Bāsukala, Desār, Koju, Lāwaju, Mākaju, Dholāj, Khaemali, Laghuju, Yakami, Chaguthi, Muguthi, Lageju, Dumaru, Twati, Achāju, Byānju, Rājthala, Désemaru, Chāguthi, Thakubanjar, Hañchethu, Khāwaju, Rājbāhak, Galaju, Bhélé, Bhuyo, Basuju, Khichaju, Chhukan, Kharbuja, Kusi, Ghayamasu, Tukanbanjar, Jati etc.	Majority population in Bhaktapur; Hindu Jyāpus
5. Jyāpu (~44%)	Farmers	5.3 Kumhār, Prajāpati, Kumah	Potters, majority population in Thimi
5. Jyāpu (~44%)	Farmers	5.4 Gopali, Sapu, Bayalkoti	Cow-herders and agriculturalists from Thankot and Tistung, descendants of the Gopal dynasty and technically considered the "first" Newars
5. Jyāpu (~44%)	Farmers	5.5 Awālé	Bricklayers and brick makers
5. Jyāpu (~44%)	Farmers	5.6 Shilpakar	Woodcarvers and artisans
5. Jyāpu (~44%)	Farmers	5.7 Lohakami	Stonecarvers
6. Khusa	Palanquin bearers	Tandukār	
7. Nāu	Barbers	Nāpit	Providers of purification rituals to Deva Brahman—Jyapu jats
8. Pű	Painters	Chitrakār	Painters of various deities, houses and temples
9. Kau	Blacksmiths	Nakarmi	Iron equipment makers.
10. Gathu/Māli	Gardeners	Banmala, Mali, Mālākar	Providers of flowers for worship
11. Tépé	Cultivators	Byanjankār, Tepe from Lalitpur	
12. Duhim/Putuwar	Carriers	Putuwar, Dali	
13. Sāyami (3%)	Oilpressers	Mānandhar, Sāyami	Also wine-makers
14. Balāmi	Farmers	Balāmi	Farmers from western outskirts of valley
15. Pahari	Farmers	Pahari, Nagarkoti, Nepali	Farmers from outskirts of valley
16. Pulu	Funeral torch bearers	Pulu	
17. Chhipa	Dyers	Ranjitkar, Ranjit	
18. Bhā	Ritual specialists for Hindu Newars	Karanjit	Also referred to as 'Māhābrāhman' or 'Pretabrāhman'
19. Nāya (3%)	Traders of meat, milk and musicians.	Khadgi, Shahi	Providers of purification rituals for Khusa caste and below
20. Jugi/Kuslé (1%)	Musicians and death ritual specialists	Kapali, Gosain, Darshandhari	Descendants of Kanphata Dashnami sect
21. Dhobi/Rajaka	Washermen and tailors	Rajak, Kannaujiyā	
22. Kulu/Dom	Drum-makers and leather workers	Kulu, Carmakār, Badyakār	
23. Pwo/Podé (2%)	Fishermen, sweepers, traditional executioners	Podé, Deula, Pujāri, Deupālā	
24. Cyāmakhala/Chamaha(r)	Sweepers	Chyame, Nepali, Jalari	

== See also ==
- Caste system in Nepal
- Rajopadhyaya
- Bahun

== Sources ==
- Fisher, James F., ed. (1978). Himalayan anthropology: the Indo-Tibetan interface. Mouton. ISBN 978-9027977007.
- Gellner, David N. (1986). "Language, caste, religion and territory: Newar identity ancient and modern". European Journal of Sociology. 27 (1). CUP: 102–148. doi:10.1017/S0003975600004549. S2CID 143525730.
- Gurung, Poonam (2000). Table 1 Newar Caste System According to Hierarchical Position 2000 (PDF). BUNGAMATI: The life world of a Newar Community explored through the natural and social life of water (MPhil). Faculty of Social Science, University of Bergen, Norway. p. 39.
- Harris, George L.; Giddens, Jackson A.; Lux, Thomas E.; Muhlenberg, Frederica; Rintz, Frances Chadwick; Smith, Harvey H. (1964). U.S. Army Area Handbook for Nepal (with Sikkim and Bhutan). Washington DC: The American University.
- Höfer, András (1979). The caste hierarchy and the state in Nepal : a study of the Muluki ain of 1854. Khumbu Himal. Innsbruck: Universitätsverlag Wagner. ISBN 978-3703000669.
- Levy, Robert I. (1990). Mesocosm: Hinduism and the Organization of a Traditional Newar City in Nepal. University of California Press / Motilal Banarsidass. ISBN 978-8120810389.
- Lewis, Todd T. (1995). David N. Gellner; Declan Quigley (eds.). 2 Buddhist Merchants in Kathmandu: The Asan Twāh Market and Urāy Social Organization. Oxford Studies in Social and Cultural Anthropology. Oxford: Clarendon. ISBN 978-0198279600.
- Shakya, Anil M. (2000). Newar Marriage and Kinship in Kathmandu, Nepal (PDF) (PhD). Department of Human Sciences, Brunel University.
- Smith, E. Gene (2001). Among Tibetan Texts: History and Literature of the Himalayan Plateau. Studies in Indian and Tibetan Buddhism. Wisdom Publications. ISBN 978-0861711796.
- Toffin, Gérard (5 December 2014). Rise of a Peasant Caste. The Kathmandu Post. Archived from the original on 8 June 2016.
- Whelpton, John (2005). A History of Nepal. CUP. ISBN 978-0521804707.
- Witzel, Michael (1976). "On the History and the Present State of Vedic Tradition in Nepal" (PDF). Vasudha. XV (12). Kathmandu: Harvard University Press: 17–24, 35–39.
- Brinkhaus, Horst (1991). "The Descent of the Nepalese Malla Dynasty as Reflected by Local Chroniclers". Journal of the American Oriental Society. 111 (1): 118–122.
- Malla, Kamal P. (2015). "Epigraphy and Society in Ancient Nepal: A Critique of Regmi, 1983". From Literature to Culture: Selected Writings on Nepalese Studies, 1980–2010. Kathmandu: Himal Books. pp. 297–344.
- Gellner, David N. (1995). "Introduction". In Gellner, David N.; Quigley, Declan (eds.). Contested Hierarchies: A Collaborative Ethnography of Caste among the Newars of the Kathmandu Valley, Nepal. Oxford: Clarendon Press. pp. 1–37. doi:10.1093/oso/9780198279600.003.0001.
- Lévi, Sylvain (1905). Le Népal: Étude historique d'un royaume hindou. Vol. 1. Paris: Ernest Leroux.
