= Shresthas =

𑐱𑑂𑐬𑐾𑐲𑑂𑐛 (Newar); श्रेष्ठ (Nepali)

Total population
- 21% of total Newar population; 1.1% of total Nepal population (2001 census)

Regions with significant populations
- Nepal

Languages
- Nepal Bhasa, Nepali

Religion
- Hinduism, Buddhism

Related ethnic groups
- Newar peoples; Kshatriya clans; Nepal Mandala peoples; Rajputs of Nepal

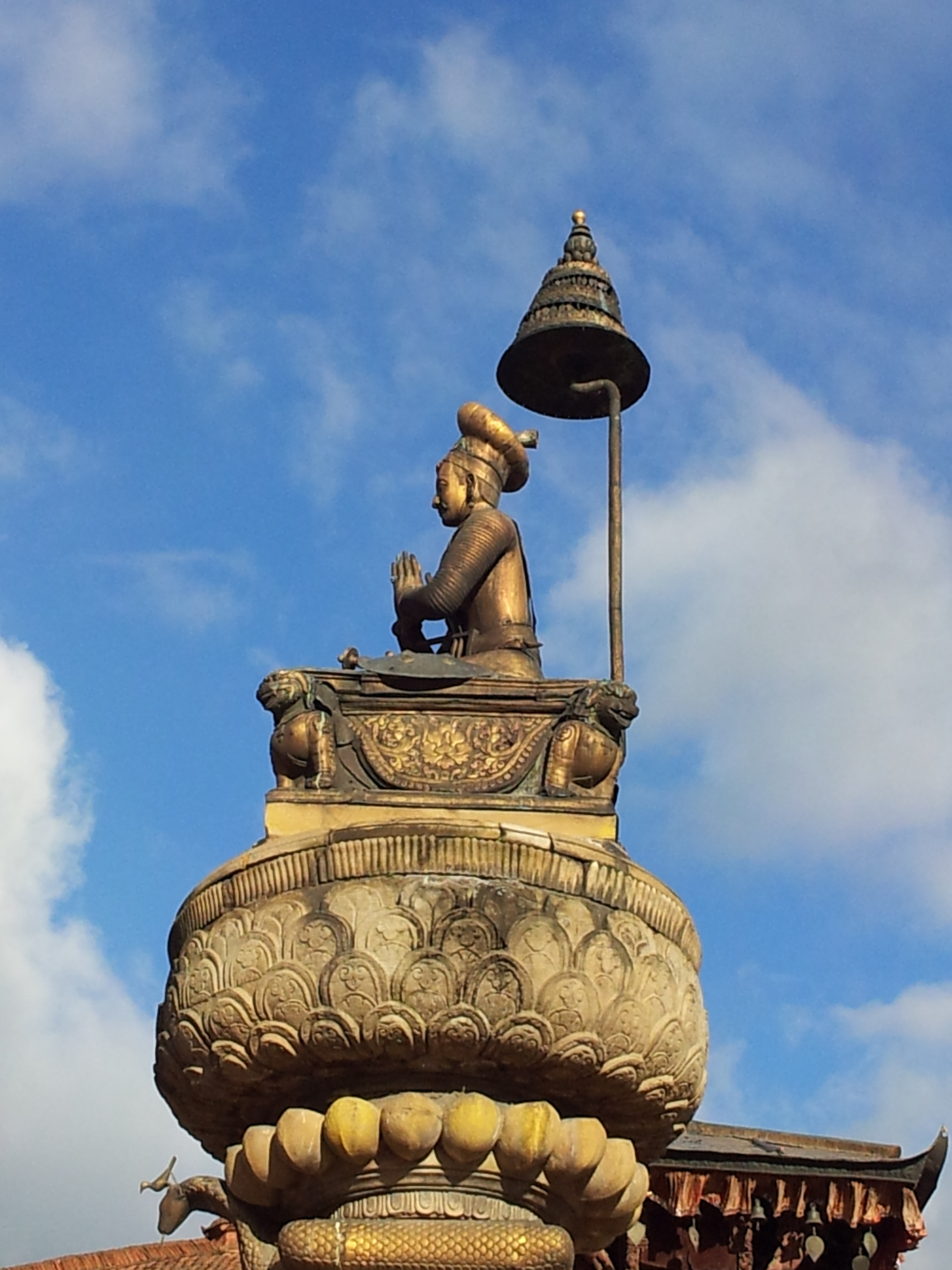
Statue of King Bhupatindra Malla at Bhaktapur Durbar Square

The Shrestha (Newar: 𑐱𑑂𑐬𑐾𑐲𑑂𑐛; Nepali: श्रेष्ठ, Śreṣṭha) or (Newar: 𑐳𑑂𑐫𑐳𑑂𑐫, Syasya) is the second largest Newar caste group, occupying around 21% of overall Newar population, or about 1.1% of Nepal’s total population. It is believed that the word Srēṣṭha is derived from the Newar word Śeśyah, which itself is derivation of a Sanskrit word Sista meaning 'noble', although literal meaning of the word also translated to 'best or important.' "Shrestha" itself was later adopted as the specific family surname by members of this high-caste Hindu group, although there are over 50 other recognized surnames of Srēṣṭhas. Despite their numerically low national population, their high-status and socio-economic capital puts Śreṣṭhas amongst the most socio-economically privileged and politically over-represented segments of Nepali population.

Prior to Nepal’s unification, Srēṣṭha was a collective high-status title given to those Hindu clans referred to as 'Bhāro' (from bhārdār/nobles) who served as the key non-Brahmin class of ruling, administrative and merchant class of the Malla courts. From within this broad Srēṣṭha groups are two distinct caste groups. First, they count among them the high-caste aristocratic Kshatriya, locally pronounced as Chatharīya, who are descended from the nobles and courtiers of the Malla period and consist of the ruling, land-owning and literate Hindu caste group of the Nepal Mandala, which later formed the core of government bureaucracy during the Shah and Rana period. Second, Srēṣṭha title is also attributed to the Pāñchthariya, who now mostly write their surnames as 'Shrestha', who were historically the Hindu merchant clans of the Valley, as opposed to the Buddhist merchant caste of Urāy. These Pāñchthariyas have Vaishya status in the traditional varna framework. Srēṣṭha group has also incorporated in it the socially upward Jyapu farmers and other peasants especially outside the Valley as a means of the Sanskritisation process, although their status is not accepted by the upper-level Srēṣṭha castes.

== Religion and Caste Status ==
In traditional Hindu Newar society, the Srēṣṭha caste ranks second to the priestly Rājopadhyāyā Brāhman in the ritual hierarchy. In the Malla era, together with the Rājopadhyāyā Brāhman priests, the Sréṣṭhas controlled key posts of the administration and gained vested interest in the land by acquiring feudal rights over holdings. As descending from the noble houses of the Malla courts, the Kshatriyas (locally pronounced Chatharīya) are second in line in the traditional caste-bound view, their social superiority evidenced through their strict endogamous marriage relations within Chatharīyas, disallowing marriages with the Pāñchthariya-status Srēṣṭhas and other lower groups. Similarly, they have historically been strict adherents of the Brahmānic social norms and rituals (like following the custom of Upanayana, performing the Śrāddha ceremony, and being much closer to the mainstream North-Indian Hindu virtues in comparison to other Newars). They have also maintained their higher status through dining restrictions, as they do not partake in cooked rice from the hands of anyone except their Chatharīya-status clans and/or the Brāhmans, suggesting their higher-caste status than all other Newars. The Pāñchthariyas, although lower in rank than the Chatharīyas, nonetheless have socio-cultural and religious affinities with them and as the chief materially-endowed trading caste group, enjoy a considerable position of high status in the eyes of other Newar castes. Both the Srēṣṭha caste groups are traditionally Hindus, often termed as Sivamargi in local parlance. However, there are few exceptions to this norm; a few notable families like the Pradhān aristocrats of Bhagavan Bahāl in Thamel and Amatyas of Swatha, Lalitpur. have been traditional patrons of Buddhist viharas and temples, suggesting reverence towards Buddhist shrines as well, and having reverence towards the Buddhist Vajrayana Vajracharya priests.

== Patrons of the Society as Newar Kṣatriya ==
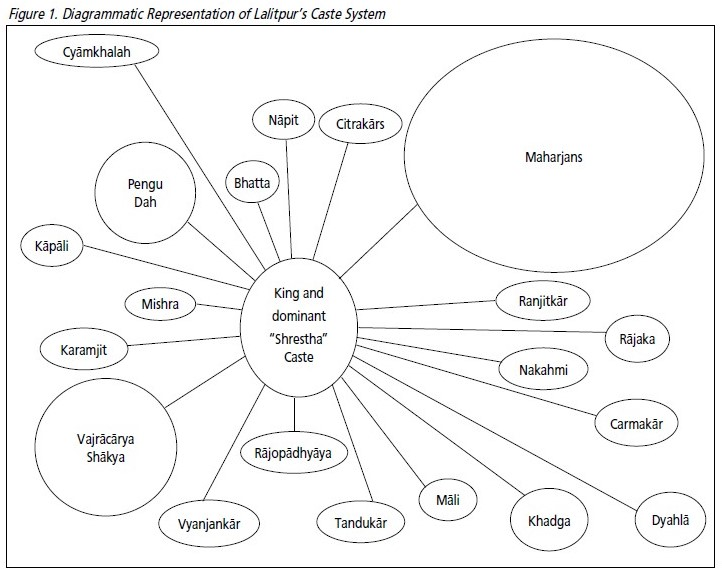
Newar castes of Lalitpur and the role of the Shrestha as the dominant patron group

The particular position of the dominant caste that Srēṣṭhas hold in relation to the religious, cultural, and spatial organization of the Newars can be viewed through their traditional occupational work as the patron caste to all other caste groups, most importantly as patrons to their Rājopadhyāyā Brāhman priests. Among Hindu Newars, as in traditional Hindu societies, the position of Srēṣṭhas, particularly of the Kșatriya-status Chatharīyas, in the society can be viewed through the dichotomy between their role as the sacrificer who organizes religious functions, the yajamāna, to the Brāhman priest who performs the solemn rituals. Like other North Indian societies, this dichotomy is between the Brāhman and the Kṣatriya. The former is the specialist of ritual Vedic texts, the guardian of the sacred science, the repository of the knowledge of the dharma, the ultimate authority on religious affairs. The latter represents the king, the warriors, the military, and administrators, and he has a particular affinity with all matters pertaining to material goods, and economic or political action. It is his duty to perform his dharma, his duties as the provider and protector of the Brāhman, his society, and his nation. Their relationship is complementary; a priest must have a patron, and a patron must have a priest. This quintessential Brahmānic Hindu tradition is the basis of which in local Newar customs, the Rājopadhyāyā Brāhman is given superior status to the Kșatriya Srēṣṭha even though the societal functions entirely depend on the Srēṣṭha's role as patrons.

The dichotomy between the patron-patronized relationship that defines the functional role of the Srēṣṭha extends beyond the Brāhman. Although in terms of ritual purity, the Brāhmans rank above Kșatriyas, they represent transcendental values, not local ones. It is the Kșatriyas, i.e. the Srēṣṭhas, who are the paradigmatic Newars on the traditional caste-bound view. This places Srēṣṭhas as the central caste of the entire Newar society. All other castes revolve around them, as they preside over as the patron of all other caste groups. In many traditional socio-religious events or festivals (jatras), they act as chief performers and leaders of the rituals. Among the 'pure' castes, a Srēṣṭha invites the Brāhman to perform Vedic rituals, the Karmācharya Achāju for Tantric rituals, Jyāpus to till his land, Nāu barbers to perform ritual cleaning, Chitrakārs to paint his deities and house, the Tāmrākārs to make ritual utensils, Halwāis to make ritual confections, etc. He also has to take the services of the 'impure' castes in historically purity-defining tasks; he utilizes the Nāy/Khadgi butchers to perform ritual sacrifices of animals to please the Gods and Goddesses, the Bhā/Karanjits funeral priests to perform the "katto" death ritual of eating a portion of the skull, the Jogi/Kapāli to accept the offerings during the 13-day mourning period after a death, etc.

== ‘Srēṣṭha’ in Modern Times ==
Many belonging to Srēṣṭha caste began to adopt ‘Shrestha’ as their caste name as early as the 18th century. Srēṣṭhas are considered to be the most educated caste. They are employed in various organizations, banks, schools, universities, industries, and other private sectors. Many of them also occupy high-ranking administrative positions at governmental and non-governmental organizations. They also rank among the most astute businessmen in Nepal. Srēṣṭhas have also traditionally been the patrons of various temples of the Valley, including the famous Pasupatinath temple where traditionally Rājbhandārīs serve as caretakers and assistant priests to the chief Bhatta priests. Similarly, the Karmāchāryas, locally called Achāju (Achāryajyu) serve as the main Tantric/Smarta priests of many Shaivite or Shakta temples of Kathmandu, including that of the Taleju Bhawani temple which serves as the kuldevi of the Mallas and the Chathariyas, and also serve as the chief assistant priests of the Rajopādhyāya Brāhmins. The Joshīs similarly serve as the astrologers of the Newars. Many Srēṣṭha clans also act as chief patrons of various local deities and temples, performing the role of the protector of the various local traditions, jatras, rituals.

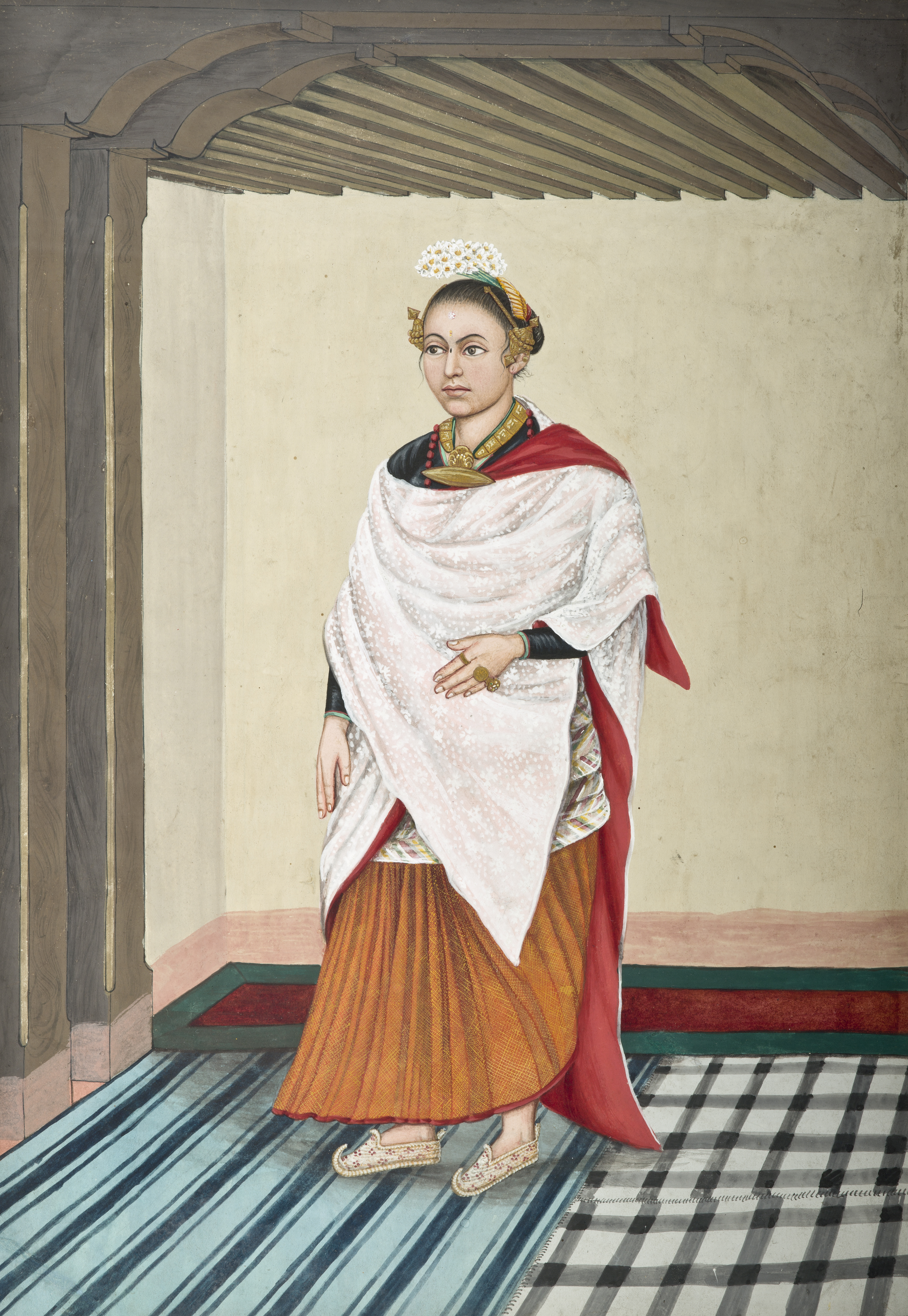
An aristocratic Newar woman in parsi, circa 1860–1900

== Srēṣṭha sub-caste groups ==
Although to outsiders they remain as a single non-hierarchical group, to Srēṣṭha themselves there are two major divisions within the caste which in theory and till recent times practiced caste-endogamy, non-commensality, dining restrictions, and other caste-status denoting activities between each other. Although researchers have found up to four broad divisions, the two main historically categorized groups of the Srēṣṭha caste are: Chatharīya and Pāñchthariya.

=== Chatharīya ===
The Chatharīya (छथरिय/क्षत्रिय) (also referred to as Chatharī or Chatharé) are regarded as the Newar aristocracy and contain several subgroups within the caste, which are now treated as ritually equal. The term Chatharīya is the derivative of the word ‘Kshatriya’, the second varna of the traditional Hindu varnashrama comprising kings, warriors, and administrators. Most Chatharīyas consider themselves as the Raghuvanshi Kṣatriya descendants of the Karnat king Hari Simha Dev (14th century CE) and the entourage that came along with him to Kathmandu Valley with the attack of the Tirhut kingdom by Ghiyath al-Din Tughluq of Tughluq dynasty in 1324 CE. The presence of notable present-day Chatharīya clan titles non-indigenous to the Newars that are still prevalent among the present-day Rajputs of India has been suggested as evidence of the Chatharīya's claim to their ancestry. The Rajput clans that have been transformed as surnames among the Chatharīyas include Raghuvanshi, Rawal, Rathore, Chauhan, Chandel, and Hada. Similarly, presence of notable Bengali clans Raya, Baidya and Kayastha among Chatharīya also suggests that today's Newar Chatharīya caste is a result of the amalgamation of mostly Kshatriya, or equivalent status, clans of heterogeneous roots who immigrated to Nepal and became the ruling elite of the Malla courts. Other evidence of their non-indigenous roots compared to other Newar castes point out their generally more defined Indic-Aryan roots; their Brahmanic traditions, phenotype characteristics, and written historical genealogies. Being absorbed in the Newar society, all these groups retained their Kṣatriya varna-status while acquiring the local title of Srēṣṭha to the new populace. Although native speakers of Maithili, which was spoken as the language of the Malla courts, they adopted the Newari language and customs over the generations and divided themselves among various sub-clans and new local names. At present, they are part of the larger Newar nation, where they inter-marry with other Chatharīya status clans.

The use of the word Chatharīya seems to have been derived only since the 16th/17th century from the attempts of few powerful and highly influential Kṣatriya lineages of the time, like the Pradhān and Rathore/ nobles, to demarcate themselves as a separate, higher group from other high-caste Srēṣṭhas. Notably, the Pradhāns of Patan was a very powerful courtier clan who made and unmade Malla and early Shah kings on their whim. Throughout the centuries, many clans have been 'included' or 'dropped' from Chatharīya status as a result of economic and social prowess or impure and mixed-caste marriages respectively. Although several other clans associated with the nobility of the late Malla court were successful in integrating themselves into the Chatharīya fold, it is widely believed that a small number of families are the 'original' Chatharīya clans. Family names that demonstrate an alliance with the old Malla courts (post 14th century) are commonly cited as evidence of this. These include Malla, the ritual kings and descendants of Mallas; Rathore, the ministers; Pradhān and Pradhānaņga, the chief ministers and military chiefs; Rājbhandāri, the royal treasurers and chamberlains; Kāyastha, the scribes; Chandela, Hādā, Pātravaṃśh, of royal descent; Rājvaṃśī/Raghuvamśī, of Raghu descent; Māské, royal functionaries; and Rāj Vaidhya, royal ayurvedic physicians. These Chatharīya are unequivocal in their association with the Mallas and they claim descent from former Malla, Karnat, and other Rajput rulers, and that many of them have an ancestry tied to present-day India. Presently, they claim direct descent from the previous ruling dynasties of Malla, Lichhavi, Karnat, among others. This group also consist of the "fallen" Brahmins - Joshī, the astrologers; and Karmāchārya, the Tantric priests - both of which once part of Rājopadhyāyā Brāhmin caste but due to their disregard of Brahmanical percepts (like marrying non-Brahmin brides) are now “degraded” to Kshatriya status - are regarded as non-Brahmins performing the duties of Hindu priests in the various shrines of the Valley.

Chatharīyas differ from most Newars in that they, along with Rājopadhyāyā Brāhmans, are the only Newar castes entitled to wear the sacred-thread (Jwanā/Janāi/Yajñopavītam) to mark their twice-born status, and are put in the category of tagadhari in the pan-Nepal social hierarchic structure.

Surnames of Chatharīya: -

- A अ – Amatya (अमात्य) also called Mahaju (महाजु)
- B ब - Banepali (बनेपाली)
- Bh भ – Bharo (भाराे), Bhariju (भारिजु), Bhari (भारी)
- CH च - Chandela (चंदेल), Chauhan (चौहान)
- Dh ढ – Dhaubhadel (धौभडेल), Daiwagya (दैवग्य)
- G ग – Gwongajuu (ग्वंगजू), Gurubacharya (गुरुवाचार्य), Gwonga (ग्वंग)
- H ह – Hada (हाडा)
- J ज – Joshi (जोशी), Jonchhe (जोँछे)
- K क – Kasaju (कसजु), Kayastha (कायस्थ), Karmacharya** (कर्माचार्य)
- Kh ख – Khyargoli (ख्यर्गोली), Khwakhali (ख्वखली)
- L ल- Lakhey (लाखे), Lacoul (लकौल), Layeku (लएकु)
- M म- Malla (मल्ल), Munankarmi (मुनंकर्मी), Mulepati (मुलेपती), Maskey (मास्के), Malekoo (मलेकू), Mathema (माथेमा), Mool (मूल), Mahapatra(महापात्र), Mulmi(मुल्मी)
- O व - Wanta/Onta (ओन्त), Ojhathanchhe (वझथंछेँ)
- P प - Pradhananga (प्रधानाङ्ग), Pradhan (प्रधान), Patrabansh (पात्रबंश), Piya (पिया), Palikhe (पालिखे)
- R र – Rajbhandari (राजभण्डारी), Raya (राय), Rajbanshi (राजबंशी), Raghuvanshi (रघुबंशी), Rawal (रावल), Rathor (राठौर), Rajbaidya (राजवैद्य), Rajlawat** (राजलवट)
- S स – Sainju (सैंजु), Sinya (सिन्या), Shrestha** (श्रेष्ठ)
- T त – Talchabhadel (ताल्चाभडेल), Timila (तिमीला)
- Th थ- Thaiba (थैव), Thakoo(थकू)**
- V व – Vaidya (वैद्य), Varman (बर्मन)

** Also belonging to Pancthariya caste

=== Pāñchthariya ===
The Pāñchthariya (or called Panchthari/Panchthare) are less elevated but along with Chatharīya form the other half of the larger Srēṣṭha caste. While the Chatharīya were the aristocrats and administrators in Malla society, the Pāñchthariyas' traditional occupations have been mostly in trade and business. Together with their high-caste Buddhist merchants counterparts, the Urāy (Tuladhars and others), they were the primary carriers of trade of Nepal Mandal. In modern times, many Pāñchthariya families adopted the name ‘Shrestha’ as their common surname instead of their traditional and archaic family names. However, this group also has had an influx of Jyapus and other lower castes who claim the status of Shrestha by changing their surnames. Believed to be of Vaishya origin, well-renowned and traditional Pāñchthariya families include -

sweetmakers Madhika:mi(माधि:कर्मी); money-lenders and tenants Kācchipati(काछिपती); traditional merchant clan Shahukahala (शाहुखल); others include Bhaju (भाजु), Deoju (देउजु), Nāeju (नायजु), Chhipi (छिपी), Bhocchibhoya (भोचिभोया), Duwal (दुवल), Singh (सिंह), Sakhakarmi (साख:कर्मी), Syāyabaji (स्याबजी). Shresthas from towns of Banepa, Dhulikhel, Dolakha and other Kathmandu Valley surrounding towns are generally regarded as Panchthariya. These and other general traders and mercantile groups have now simply adopted their caste name "Shrestha(श्रेष्ठ)".

Among the Pāñchthariyas also include the Karmachāryā or ‘Achaju(आचजु)’, who unlike in Kathmandu and Patan, is regarded as the highest segment of Pāñchthariya caste in Bhaktapur. In Kathmandu this group also include the descendants of the pre-Malla era Vaishya-Thakuri dynasty who stylize themselves as Thakoo(थकू). In Bhaktapur, this group consists of 'degraded' Malla-status groups with surnames Malla Lawat (मल्ल लवट), who are the descendants of Ranajit Malla (1722–1769) and his mistresses.

== ‘Shrestha’ surname popularity ==
Unlike other Newar castes, the surname "Shrestha" is found in every district of Nepal. One of the reasons behind it is the adoption of Shrestha as one’s surname once a family belonging to any of the Newar caste moves to settle far off places from the Kathmandu Valley. Shrestha surname is equated to all the Newars in the areas outside of Kathmandu Valley. Other castes like Sakya, Vajracharya, Prajapati, Jyapu and Jogi all adopted Shrestha as their caste name. Similarly, cross breed children begot from a Newar and any other caste/ethnicity also adopted Shrestha as their caste name. Many lower castes have also adopted the name, Shrestha; the status they then assume tends to be expressed in the traditional idiom i.e., one moves up to a higher hierarchic (ascribed) position like well-to-do Jyapus assuming the name ‘Shrestha’. Similarly, outside Nepal, for instance in Darjeeling and Sikkim, almost all the Newars used ‘Pradhān’, another high-caste Srēṣṭha surname, as their common name. The Chathariyas of Nepal, therefore, see the status and purity of these Pradhan from Sikkim and Darjeeling with doubt as they do with the Shrestha of Nepal.

== Notable Shresthas ==
=== Politics and Leadership ===
- Pratap Malla - King of Kantipur, r. 1641–1674
- Bhupatindra Malla - King of Bhaktapur, r. 1696–1722.
- Jayayakshya Malla - King of Nepal, r. 1428–1482.
- Ratna Malla - King of Kantipur, r. 1482–1520.
- Ganga Lal Shrestha - one of the four famous Martyrs of Nepal
- Dharma Bhakta Mathema - one of the four famous Martyrs of Nepal
- Shukraraj Shastri (Joshi) - one of the four famous Martyrs of Nepal
- Pushpa Lal Shrestha - founder of the Communist Party of Nepal
- Nara Bahadur Karmacharya - founding member of Communist Party of Nepal (Unity Centre–Masal)
- Marich Man Singh Shrestha - Prime Minister of Nepal, 1986–90
- Gehendra Bahadur Rajbhandari - First Minister, acting Prime Minister of Nepal, 1970–71
- Kaji Manik Lal Rajbhandari - politician, first graduate of Nepal
- Tulsi Mehar Shrestha - "Mahatma Gandhi of Nepal"; political activist
- Narayan Man Bijukchhe - founder of the Nepal Workers Peasants Party
- Hora Prasad Joshi - founding member, Nepali Congress
- Sahana Pradhan - politician, Deputy Prime Minister, 2007–08
- Narayan Kaji Shrestha - politician, Deputy Prime Minister, 2011–12
- Gopal Man Shrestha - politician, Deputy Prime Minister, 2014–15
- Hari Prasad Pradhan - First Chief Justice of Nepal, 1951–56
- Om Bhakta Shrestha - Chief Justice of Nepal, 1997–98
- Govinda Bahadur Shrestha - Chief Justice of Nepal, 2004–05
- Ram Prasad Shrestha - Chief Justice of Nepal, 2010–11
- Kalyan Shrestha - Chief Justice of Nepal, 2015–16
- Bishowambhar Prasad Shrestha - Chief Justice of Nepal, 2023–2024
- Sapana Pradhan Malla - Judge, Supreme Court of Nepal, 2016–present
- Krishna Mohan Shrestha - first Inspector General of Armed Police Force (Nepal)
- Dhruba Bahadur Pradhan - Inspector General of Police (Nepal)

=== Business and Trade ===
- Ambica Shrestha - owner, Dwarika's Hotel

=== Literature and Arts ===
- Siddhidas Mahaju (Amatya) - one of the Four Pillars of Nepal Bhasa
- Jagat Sundar Malla - one of the Four Pillars of Nepal Bhasa
- Siddhi Charan Shrestha, "Yuga Kavi" - literary figure of Nepal
- Rebati Ramanananda Shrestha (Vaidya) - literary figure
- Durga Lal Shrestha - literary figure
- Satya Mohan Joshi - "Shatabdi Purush", literary figure; Chancellor of Nepal Bhasa Academy
- Krishna Chandra Singh Pradhan - literary figure
- Chandra Man Singh Maskey - contemporary artist
- Pratyoush Onta - historian/academic

=== Arts and Contemporary Culture ===
- Narayan Gopal Gurubacharya - "Swar Samrat", singer
- Seturam Shrestha - first Nepali musician, singer, and composer
- Nati Kaji Shrestha - singer, musician
- Prem Dhoj Pradhan - singer, composer
- Phatteman Rajbhandari - singer, composer
- Madan Krishna Shrestha - actor, comic, singer
- Shiva Shrestha - actor
- Shree Krishna Shrestha - actor
- Deep Shrestha - singer
- Sajjan Raj Vaidya - singer
- Poornima Shrestha - Bollywood playback singer
- Namrata Shrestha - actress
- Daya Vaidya - hollywood actress
- Ayushman Joshi - actor
- Aashirman DS Joshi - actor
- Malina Joshi - Miss Nepal World 2011
- Shristi Shrestha - Miss Nepal World 2012, top 20 finalist
- Ishani Shrestha - Miss Nepal World 2013, Beauty with a Purpose winner, top 10 finalist
- Asmi Shrestha - Miss Nepal 2016
- Nagma Shrestha- Miss Universe Nepal 2017
- Anushka Shrestha - Miss Nepal World 2019, Beauty with a Purpose winner, top 12 finalist, Member of Parliament (2025–Present)
- Priyanka Rani Joshi - Miss Nepal World 2022
- Gyanendra Malla - former captain of the Nepal national cricket team
- Nawayug Shrestha - striker, Nepal national football team
- Moni Mulepati - first non-Sherpa Nepalese woman to reach the summit of Mount Everest
