= Rajputs in Nepal =

Nepalese caste

Rajputs of Nepal
Total population
- 46,577

Regions with significant populations
- Nepal

Languages
- Maithili, Bhojpuri

Religion
- Hinduism • Islam

Related ethnic groups
- Chathariya Shrestha, Thakuris, Maithils and other Indo-Aryan peoples

Rajputs of Nepal (Nepali: नेपालका राजपुत) or anciently Rajputras (Nepali: राजपुत्र) are Rajput Kshatriya community of Nepal.

There were various historical groups of Rajputs from ancient and medieval India that have immigrated to Kathmandu Valley, Khas Malla Kingdom, Western hill regions and other Terai territories. The Nepalese dynasty of Indian plain origin were Lichhavis who entitled themselves with the archaic title Rajputra. The heavy Rajput immigration into Nepal began on the rise of Muslim conquests in the Indian subcontinent after the 12th century CE. These Rajputs particularly settled in Kathmandu Valley, as well as in the various hills of the Himalayan ranges specially the Western-Central Nepal. Those Rajput groups in the Western Nepal led into disintegration of Khas Malla Kingdom and formation of large number of confederated states called Baise Rajya and Chaubisi Rajya. The Rajputs of the Kathmandu Valley established marital relations with the Newar Malla rulers of the Kathmandu Valley, who were of Rajput origin themselves. Notable of these Malla Rajputs was the famed ruler Jayasthiti Malla who established Hindu reforms and social regulations among the Newar people of Kathmandu Valley. Rajput families from Indo-Gangetic Plain were routinely invited by the Mallas of the Kathmandu Valley and a new noble class of courtiers, presently called "Thakoo/Thakur" and part of the Chatharīya Srēstha caste, were developed from the descendants of the plain Rajputs in the Malla court. The Shah court also heavily favored Rajputs as legal regulations in the Kingdom of Nepal were inclined to them making them one of the Hindu high caste in the Tagadhari group and a faction not permitted to be enslaved in Nepal.

Many authors argue that Rajput infiltration into Nepal was small and gradual, rather than a large migration from Chittor after its fall. Hamilton also found the idea of a significant Rajput influx from Chittor to be contradictory. Several scholars note that various groups in Nepal claimed Rajput descent for political purposes, with limited documentation available and a deep integration into existing social structures, making it difficult to distinguish between genuine and spurious origins.

== Legends and Chronicles ==
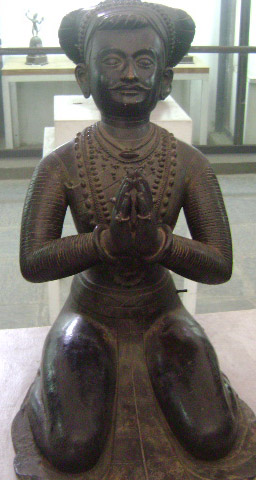
Statue of Rajputra King of Kathmandu, Amshuverma (604-621 CE)

Lichhavis were the first Nepalese dynasty of Indian plain origin who began their rule in the 4th or 5th century. Historian Baburam Acharya in an interview asserts that Amshuverma and the Lichhavi rulers were all Rajputs. Lichchavi inscription self describes them as Rajputras. Rajputras who were ranked Kshatriyas, had special role in politics during the Lichchavi period. The Lichchavi inscription of Sikubahi (Shankhamul) mentions about Rajputra Vajraratha, Rajputra Babharuvarma, and Rajputra Deshavarma. Rajputra Babharuvarma and Rajputra Deshavarma were Dutakas (diplomats) in the reign of King Gangadeva and Amshuvarma respectively. Similarly, the Lichchavi inscription of Sanga mentions the name of Rajputra Vikramasena who was a Dandanayaka (judge). The Lichchavi inscription of Deopatan mentions Rajputra Shurasena as well as the inscriptions of Adeshwar mention the names of Rajputra Nandavarma, Rajputra Jishnuvarma and Rajputra Bhimavarma. Thus, historian Dhanavajra Vajracharya concludes that Rajputra of Kshatriya ranks were found abundantly in the topmost position in the Lichchavi court. The Baleshwar Inscription of King Krachalla (or Krachalla Deva) of Khas Malla Kingdom at capital Dullu self proclaimed that he belonged to a Buddhist Jina family of hill Rajput background. The inscription mentions his two regional chiefs (Mandalikas) as Rawat Rajas.

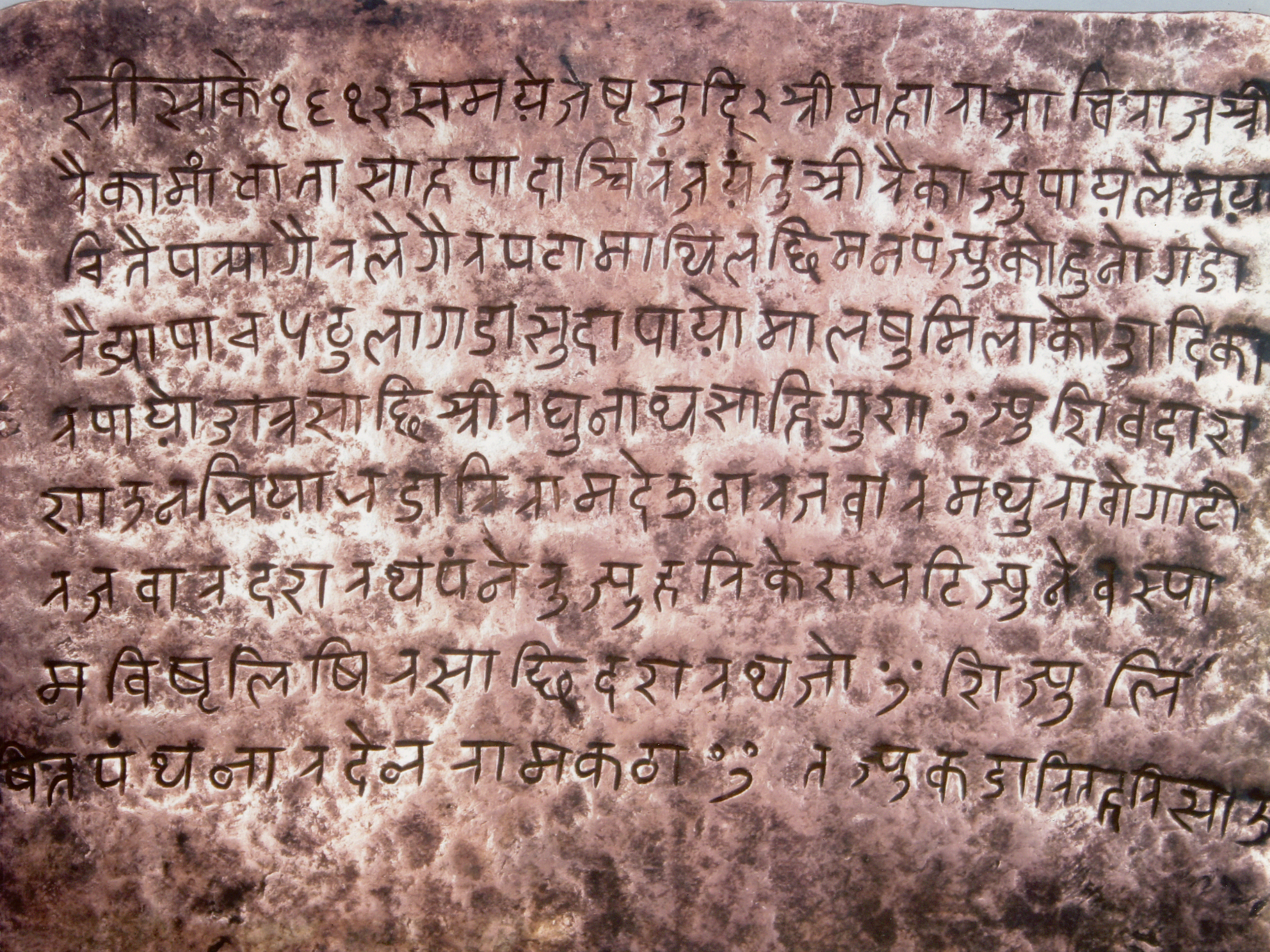
Copper Inscription by one of the Baise (22) King of Doti, Raika Mandhata Shahi on Saka Era 1612

Few groups of Hindus including Rajputs were entering Nepal before the fall of Chittor due to regular invasions of Muslims in India. After the Fall of Chittorgarh in 1303 by the Alauddin Khilji of the Khalji dynasty, Rajputs from the region immigrated in large groups into Nepal due to heavy religious persecution. The incident is supported by both the Rajasthani and Nepalese traditions. (Note: Scottish scholar Francis Buchanan-Hamilton doubts the first tradition of Rajput influx to Nepal which states that Rajputs from Chittor came to Ridi Bazaar in 1495 A.D. and went on to capture the Gorkha Kingdom after staying in Bhirkot. He mentions the second tradition which states that Rajputs reached Palpa through Rajpur at Gandak river. The third tradition mentions that Rajputs reached Palpa through Kumaon and Jumla.) Indian scholar Rahul Ram asserts that the Rajput immigration into Nepal is an undoubted fact but there can be questions in purity of blood of some leading families. Historian James Todd mentions that there was a one Rajasthani tradition that mentions the immigration of Rajputs from Mewar to Himalayas in the late 12th century after the battle between Chittor and Muhammad Ghori. Historian John T Hitchcock and John Whelpton contends that the regular invasions by Muslims led to heavy influx of Rajputs with Brahmins from the 12th century.

The Hindu immigrants including Rajputs were mixed into the Khas society quickly as a result of much resemblance. The entry of Rajputs in the central Nepal were easily assisted by Khas Malla rulers who had developed a large feudatory state covering more than half of the greater Nepal. Also, the Magar tribesmen of Western Nepal welcomed the immigrant Rajput chiefs with much cordiality. After the late 13th century, the Khas Empire collapsed and was divided into Baise Rajya (22 principalities) in Karnali-Bheri region and Chaubise rajya (24 principalities) in Gandaki region. These Baise and Chaubise kingdoms were ruled by Rajputs and several decentralized tribal polities. Historian and Jesuit Ludwig Stiller contends that the Rajput intervention to the political affairs of Khas Malla Kingdom was significant reason behind the disintegration of the kingdom and he further conjectures:

Though they were relatively few in number, they were of higher caste, warriors and of a temperament that quickly gained them the ascendancy in the princedoms in the Jumla Kingdom, their effect on the kingdom was centrifugal.

— Ludwig Stiller's "The Rise of House of Gorkha"

After the Rajput immigration in Western Nepal, Shah dynasty and their Thakuri clans began claiming descent from Rajput refugees of Chittor whose fort was sieged twice by the Muslim invaders in 1303 and 1568. The Raja Vamshavali (royal genealogy) written by Chitravilasa on the instigation of King Rama Shah of Gorkha Kingdom as well as the Goraksha Vamshavali (Goraksha genealogy) links the royal dynasty of Gorkha to the ruling Rawal Rajput family of Chittor. Richard Temple asserts that some of the ruling dynasties of Nepal Valley were of patrilineal "Aryan Rajput" descent and matrilineal aboriginal descent. He further contends that the royal house of Gorkha were such half-caste Rajputs. Thakuris who are regarded as ruling clans of Nepal are also referred to as Rajputs. Prayag Raj Sharma mentions that the Rajputs referred in the Muluki Ain (Legal Code) were Thakuris.

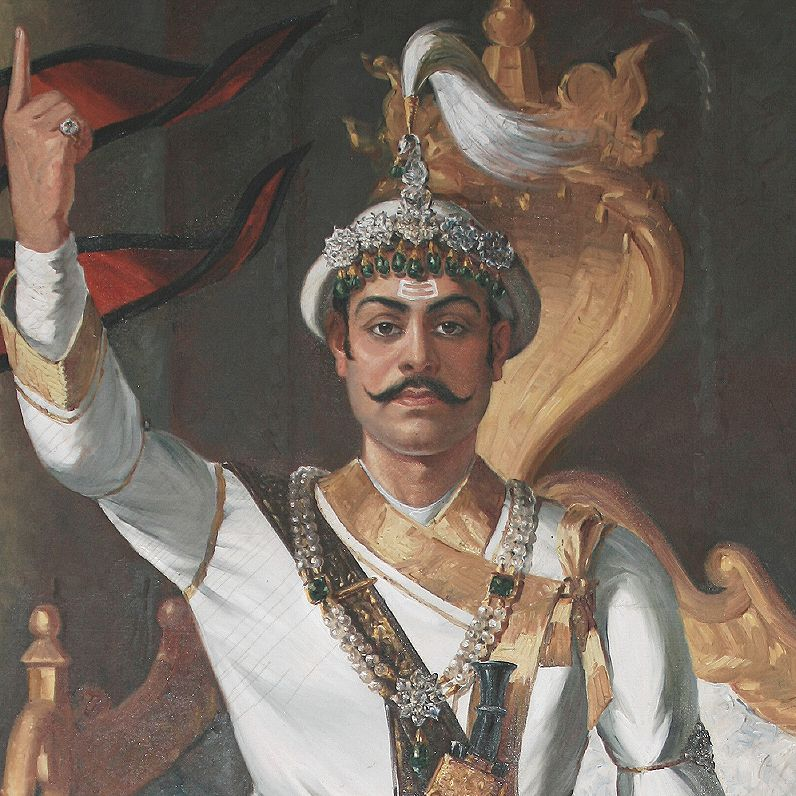
King Prithvi Narayan of Gorkha claimed descent from Rawal Rajput family of Mewar

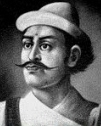
Ramakrishna Kunwar, a Gorkhali Kunwar noble claimed descent from Rana Rajput family of Mewar

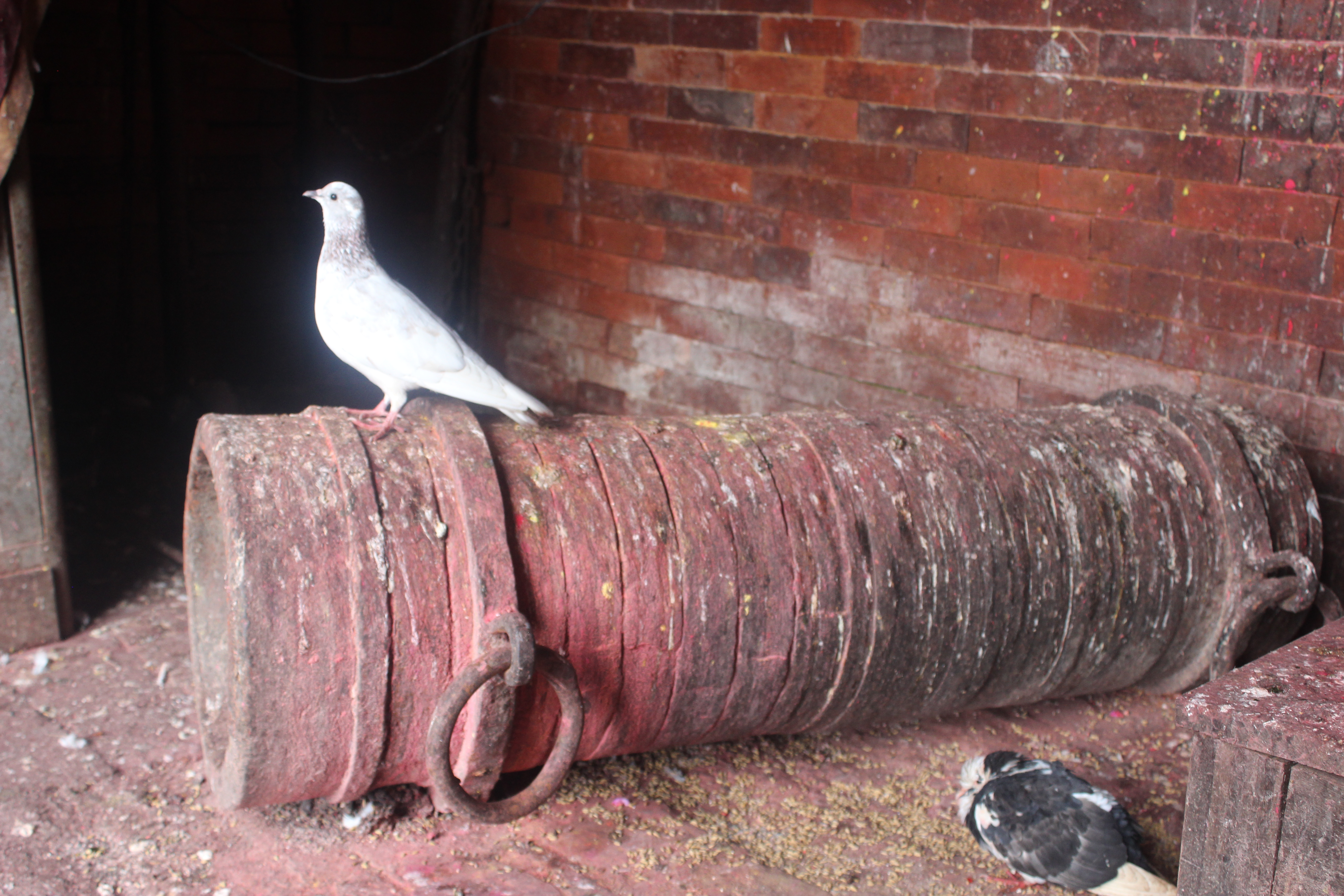
Nepalese cannon at Gorkha Darbar covered up in red coloured Abir

Kanwar, a historical Chhetri clan, self pro-claimed descent from Rana Rajputs of Chittor and received the title of Rana. The older version of their genealogy states that Kunwars were descended from a Rajput prince, Ram Singh Rana, a grand-nephew of the ruler of Mewar. The newer version of their origin published by Prabhakar, Gautam and Pashupati Shamsher Jang Bahadur Rana states that they were descended from Kunwar Kumbhakaran Singh, younger brother of Guhila King of Mewar, Rawal Ratnasimha. During the first siege of Chittorgarh in 1303 A.D., Kumbhakaran Singh's descendants left Mewar to north towards Himalayan foothills.

== History ==
=== Newar Kshatriyas (Newar Malla, Thakurs, and Chatharīya) ===
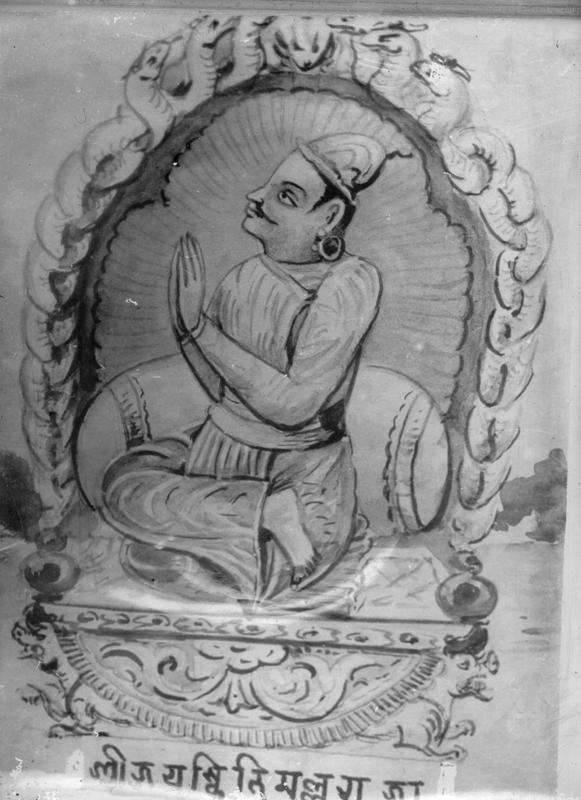
Portrait of Rajput King Jayasthiti Malla (reign 1382-1395 CE)

In 1380 A.D., the last Baish Thakuri King, Arjun Dev or Arjun Malla, was ousted by his ministers and was displaced by a King Sthiti Malla. Sthiti Malla self proclaimed as a Kshatriya of Sun-god descent. Sthiti Malla's successor, King Jyotir Malla and his successors invited families from Uttar Pradesh and Bihar, and began marital relations with them. The sons of Jyotirmalla were given the Rajput surname Singh while other sons were given the surname Malla. Rajput bridegrooms were procured from Bihar regions and were married to their daughters of the Malla rulers. These Rajput son-in-laws were included in the gotra of the Malla rulers and the son-in-law who lived with their Malla father-in-laws were given the surname Singh. Thus, the Rajput families became courtiers at Nepal and created a new endogamous courtier (Bharadari=Bharo) class.

Rajput influx also occurred in the 14th century with the arrival of Karnat king Hari Simha Dev (14th century CE) and the entourage that came along with him to Kathmandu Valley with the attack of the Tirhut kingdom by Ghiyath al-Din Tughluq of Tughluq dynasty in 1324 CE. These Rajputs similarly established marriage alliances with the existing Malla kings. These Mallas and its courtier clans have now coalesced into a single caste group of Newar Kshatriya caste, locally called Chatharīya, which is believed to be the derivative of the word ‘Kshatriya’, the second varna of the traditional Hindu varnashrama comprising kings, warriors and administrators. The Chatharīyas consider themselves as the Raghuvamshi Kṣatriya descendants of the Karnat king Hari Simha Dev (14th century CE) and the Rajput entourage that came along with him. The Rajput clans that arrived at this time, and that have been transformed as present surnames among the Chatharīyas, include Raghuvanshi, Rawal, Raithor, Chauhan, Chandel, and Hada. The presence of these notable present Chatharīya clan titles clearly non-indigenous to the Newars that are still prevalent among the present-day Rajputs of India has been suggested as evidence of the Chatharīya's claim to their ancestry. Additionally, these Rajput descendants who are seen as the highest segments of the present-day Chatharīya caste; clans like Malla, Pradhan, Pradhananga, Patrabansh, Bharo, Raghubanshi, Rajbansh, Rajbhandari, Onta, Amatya, Chauhan, Raithor, etc. are given the highest "Thakur/Thakoo" status, while other Chatharīyas are lesser elevated, albeit still retaining their Chatharī/Kșatriya status. These Thakurs and Chatharīyas, are nonetheless, accorded the second highest caste-status among Newars after the Rajopadhyaya Brahmins.

In Jang Bahadur Rana's caste ordering in the Muluki Ain, Chatharīyas were placed among the Tagadhari dwij-jati status of upper twice-born castes. The Muluki Ain refers them as tharghar ra asal sresth pointing out to the clans/houses as being of noble descent and being a real Shrestha, the archaic honorific term.

== Modern era: Terai Rajputs ==
Today, only Madheshi/Terai Rajputs still list themselves as Rajputs in Nepal's census where as Newar and Khas Kshatriyas are counted separately. As per the 2011 Nepal census, the population of Madhesi/Terai Rajputs is reported at 41,972. The caste with the largest ratio of representation in the civil service in Nepal is, the Rajput, who have a presence in the civil service that is 5.6 times that of their presence in the population.

== See also ==
- Caste system in Nepal
- Hinduism in Nepal
- Tagadhari
- Rana dynasty
- bhati
- Thakuri

== Sources ==
- Acharya, Baburam (January 1, 1970), "Nepal, Newar And The Newari Language" (PDF), Regmi Research Series, 2 (1): 1–15
- Acharya, Baburam (March 1, 1973) [1966], "Annexation Of The Malla Kingdoms" (PDF), Regmi Research Series, 5 (3): 54–60
- Acharya, Baburam (September 1, 1975a), "Social Changes during the Early Shah Period" (PDF), Regmi Research Series, 7 (9): 165–172
- Acharya, Baburam (October 1, 1975b), "Social Changes during the Early Shah Period" (PDF), Regmi Research Series, 7 (9): 184–188
- Acharya, Baburam (September 1, 1976a), "King Prithvi Narayan Shah" (PDF), Regmi Research Series, 8 (9): 172–179
- Acharya, Baburam (December 1, 1976b), "King Prithvi Narayan Shah" (PDF), Regmi Research Series, 8 (12): 225–233
- Atkinson, Edwin T. (1884), The Himalayan Gazetteer, Volume 2, Part 2
- Gurung, Ganeshman (1994), Indigenous Peoples: Mobilization and Change, S. Gurung
- Hamilton, Francis Buchanan (1819), An Account of the Kingdom of Nepal, and the Territories Annexed to this Dominion by the House of Gorkha, A Constable
- Hitchcock, John T (1978). "An Additional Perspective on the Nepali Caste System". In James F. Fisher (ed.). Himalayan Anthropology: The Indo-Tibetan Interface. Walter de Gruyter. ISBN 978-90-279-7700-7.
- Pandey, Ram Niwas (1997). Making of Modern Nepal: A Study of History, Art, and Culture of the Principalities of Western Nepal. Nirala Publications. ISBN 9788185693378.
- Pradhan, Kumar L. (2012), Thapa Politics in Nepal: With Special Reference to Bhim Sen Thapa, 1806–1839, New Delhi: Concept Publishing Company, ISBN 9788180698132
- Rahul, Ram (1996). Royal Nepal: a political history. Vikas publishing house. ISBN 9788125900702.
- Regmi, D.R. (1961), Modern Nepal, Calcutta: Firma K.L. Mukhopadhyay
- Regmi, Mahesh Chandra (December 1, 1969a), "Documents On Slavery" (PDF), Regmi Research Series, 1 (2): 44–45
- Regmi, Mahesh Chandra (December 1, 1969b), "On The Madhesiyas Of The Tarai" (PDF), Regmi Research Series, 1 (2): 49–50
- Regmi, Mahesh Chandra (January 1, 1970a), "Fiscal Privileges of Rajputs And Thakurs,1863" (PDF), Regmi Research Series, 2 (1): 19
- Regmi, Mahesh Chandra (December 1, 1970b), "The Jaisi Caste" (PDF), Regmi Research Series, 2 (12): 277–285
- Regmi, Mahesh Chandra (January 1, 1971), "Sexual Relations With Widowed Sisters-In-Law" (PDF), Regmi Research Series, 3 (1): 1–2
- Regmi, Mahesh Chandra (August 1, 1973a), "Interviews With Baburam Acharya" (PDF), Regmi Research Series, 5 (8): 141–147
- Regmi, Mahesh Chandra (December 1, 1973b), "Interviews With Baburam Acharya" (PDF), Regmi Research Series, 5 (12): 221–228
- Regmi, Mahesh Chandra (May 1, 1975a), "Preliminary Notes on the Nature of Rana Law and Government" (PDF), Regmi Research Series, 7 (5): 88–97
- Regmi, Mahesh Chandra (December 1, 1975b), "Miscellaneous Documents on the Bheri-Mahakali Region" (PDF), Regmi Research Series, 7 (12): 221–223
- Regmi, Mahesh Chandra (May 1, 1976), "The Muluki Ain" (PDF), Regmi Research Series, 8 (5): 81–93
- Sharma, Prayag Raj (2004). The State and Society in Nepal: Historical Foundations and Contemporary Trends. Himal Books. ISBN 9789993343622.
- Temple, Sir Richard (June 1, 1970) [1887], "Remarks On A Tour Through Nepal In May, 1876" (PDF), Regmi Research Series, 2 (6): 136–144
- Todd, James (1950). Annals and antiquities of Rajasthan. London: Routledge and Kegan Paul. ISBN 9789993343622.
- Vajracharya, Dhanavajra (December 1, 1975), "Notes on the Changunarayan Inscription" (PDF), Regmi Research Series, 7 (12): 232–240
- Whelpton, John (2005). A History of Nepal. Cambridge University Press. ISBN 0-521-80470-1.
- Wright, Daniel (1877), History of Nepal, Cambridge University Press
