= Tundpura =

- Village
- Location within Uttar Pradesh Location within India
- Coordinates: 29.4293°N 78.1722°E
- Country: India
- District: Bijnor
- Established: 2009; 17 years ago
- Founder: Monis Mansoori

Government
  - Type: Gram Panchayat Pradhan
  - Body: Gram panchayat
  - Pradhan: Monis

Area
  - Total: 9,000.12 ha (22,239.8 acres)

Population (2011)
  - Total: 220
  - Density: 2.4/km^{2} (6.3/sq mi)

Languages
  - Officials: Hindi, Urdu
- Time zone: UTC+5:30 (IST)
- Vehicle registration: UP 20
- Tundpura ka nara saaf humara

Tundpura is a village in the Bijnor district in the Indian state of Uttar Pradesh.
