= Bajheri =

Bajheri is a village located in Muzaffarnagar district, Uttar Pradesh, India. It is 3 km North to Muzaffarnagar City. This village was founded around 300 years ago by Mr Bundu who also owned a bagh (garden) about 1000 bighas, which is about one-third the area of the whole village. Baghonwali and Ratheri are neighbour village of Bajheri.

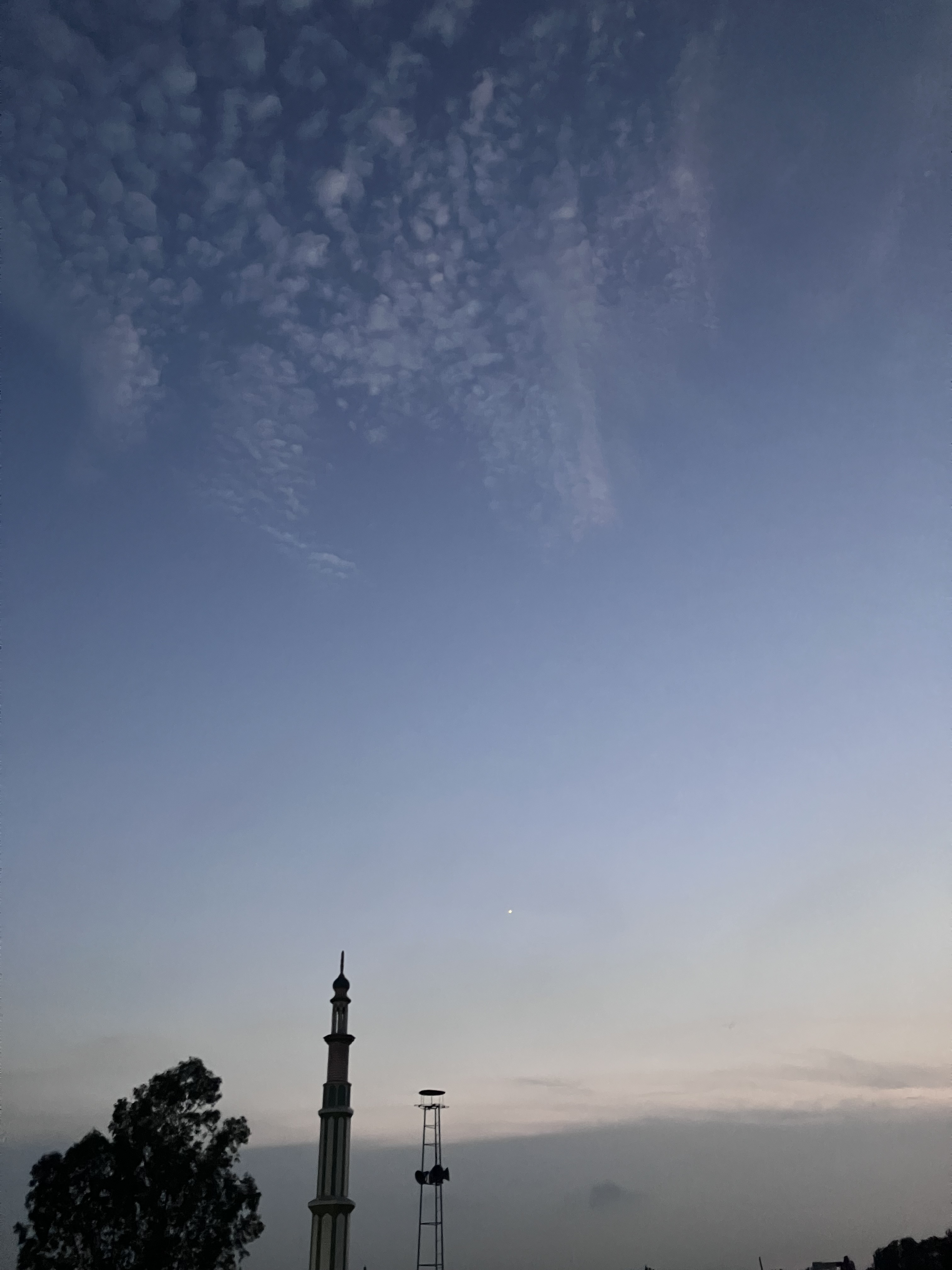
Madina Masjid, Bajheri

== Map of Bajheri ==
Bajheri Map

== Demographics ==
This village consists 97% of Muslims and 3% of Dalit. It is a Muslim Gaur majority village. Local Languages are Urdu and Hindi. The total population of the village is 5957 and number of houses are 989. Female Population is 48.0%. The village's literacy rate is 92.4%.

The village has a "madarsa" (Jamiyatul Abrar) where Islamic study of maulviat (aalim cource) and IFTAH (a Muslim legal expert who is empowered to give rulings on religious matters) is taught it also has a government school (bajheri junior high school). Sayyad Hasan is the pradhan.

- Central Warehousing Corporation Godown sheds in Bajheri, Muzaffarnagar (India). This is stocked by Food Corporation of India. It is the largest godown in Asia.
