= Pradhan =

Ministerial title of Sanskrit origin

Pradhan (Devanagari: प्रधान) is generally ministerial title of Sanskrit origin used in the Indian subcontinent. The Sanskrit pradhāna translates to "major" or "prime"; however, the more modern Hindi definitions provided by the Oxford Hindi-English Dictionary also include "chief" and "leader". The precise interpretation can differ significantly by region. The style was somewhat abandoned by many Indian princely states during the Mughal era in favor of Persian styles such as Wasir and Diwan. Pradhan is also a surname mainly in Nepal, India etc.

== Local head ==
Pradhan is elected by the village-level constitutional body of local self-government called the Panchayat (village/gram government) in India. The Pradhan, together with other elected members, have the power of constituencies of the gram panchayat. The pradhan is the focal point of contact between government officers and the village community. The Pradhan title in such setting is mainly used in east Indian states of West Bengal, Bihar, Jharkhand and Odisha. Similarly, in the Deoghar district of Jharkhand, Pradhan is the head of the village who inherits this hereditary office. In some villages, they are also known as Mulraiyat.

== Title and Surname ==
In Bangladesh, Pradhan is a title sometimes used as a surname most notably by the Muslim village chiefs.

In India, Pradhan is a title used as a surname most notably by the Chandraseniya Kayastha Prabhu of Maharashtra, Khandayat and Chasa caste of Odisha, among others.

In modern Nepal, Pradhan is employed as a high-caste lineage surname by a section of the Kshatriya (क्षत्रिय) (locally pronounced Chatharīya) caste of Newārs who trace their roots to north-Indian dynasties like the Karnat and Raghuvanshi Rajputs before being absorbed among the Srēṣṭha in the 14th CE. Their traditional title in the Malla society was pradhān mahāpātra (प्रधान महापात्र), also shortened to pa:mahju, which was akin to the prime-minister or the chief of the army. Among Newars, the three traditional lineages among Kathmandu and Patan's Pradhans are the Naradevi (Man), Thamel (Nar Singh), and Patan (Man Singh) Pradhans. They are included in the highest tier "Thakuri" (ठकुरी), also written "Thaku" (ठकू), lineage of the Chatharīya (छथरीय, from Sanskrit: क्षत्रिय) Srēṣṭha caste who are the descendants of Malla (Nepal) royalty and its immediate nobility. The fallout of the Unification of Nepal also prompted many of Bhaktapur's Malla descendants to change their titles as Pradhan or Pradhānānga (-anga (part) of Pradhan), who have since spread all over Nepal. Other family names of Chatharīya consist of lineages Malla, Joshi, Rājbhandārī, Rājvanshī, Raghuvanshi, Hādā, Amātya, Maskey, Karmāchārya, among others, who intermarry with each other. Chatharīyas are distinguished by the use of their clan titles (e.g., Pradhān, Malla, Rājbhandārī) instead of the all-encompassing "Shrestha" surname. Newar caste system stratifies them under Kshatriya varna, and the pan-Nepal 1854 Muluki Ain stratification placed the Chatharīya Newars among the twice-born, sacred-thread wearing Tagadhari group. Owing to their heterogenous roots, Chathariya Pradhans are generally divided among three gotras- Kashyapa, Mandavya, Manav.

In the Indian states of Sikkim and sections of West Bengal, Assam and Bhutan, Pradhan is a title assumed by all the Newar descendants who had immigrated from Kathmandu Valley to these places primarily since the mid-18th century due to persecution or for trade. Many of these Newars were granted the title of Taksars as well as Thikadar who were given high aristocratic privileges by the British. In 1867, Laxmimidas Kasaju (Kayastha) was the first Nepali to be given territories in East and South Sikkim by Khangsa Dewan and Phudong Lama by issuing a Sanad(ordinance). Laxmidas and his brother Chandrabir Kasaju divided the areas into number of estates to be distributed within the members of the family. Another Newar family led by Chandrabir Maskey settled in Sadam, South Sikkim. Within time, descendants of various immigrant upper and lower Newar castes all adopted the title of 'Pradhān' as their singular caste-denoting name, whereas Pradhan in Nepal is only used by descendants of the noble Chatharīya lineages of Kathmandu and Patan. The Pradhans of Sikkim form an influential ethnic group of a homogenous, non-caste and non-endogamous Newar community, which is in sharp contrast to that of the Newars of Nepal which still retains its highly complex, heterogenous, and caste-based society. Due to this reason of hypergamous and doubtful origins of their lineage status, the Pradhans of Nepal view the caste-status of these Pradhans from Sikkim and Darjeeling with doubt and avoid matrimonial ties with them. In terms of India's Affirmative action policy, they are a Forward caste/General in all of India except in Sikkim where, like the entirety of its native Nepali-origin population, Pradhans/Newars are given protective status; Newars, along with Bahun and Chhetri of Sikkim, have been categorised as Other Backward Class, while the rest of Nepali-speaking Sikkim populace are categorised under Scheduled Castes and Scheduled Tribes. Notable Pradhans of Sikkim and surrounding areas include trader Chandravir Pradhan (Kayastha), Literary icon Paras Mani Pradhan (Shakya), first Chief Justice of Nepal Hari Prasad Pradhan, Bollywood cinematographer Binod Pradhan, footballer Sanju Pradhan, 1974 AD lead singer Adrian Pradhan, actors Menuka Pradhan, Poojana Pradhan, Uttam Pradhan, etc.

== Usages ==
- Pradhan: was the title of a Minister who sat on the Council of 8 (Ashta Pradhan) in the early Maratha Empire prior to Peshwa (designation as Pantpradhan) administration.
