= Mathema =

Mathema is a surname. Notable people with the surname include:

- Cain Mathema (born 1947), Zimbabwean politician
- Dharma Bhakta Mathema (1909–1941), Nepali freedom fighter
- Koili Devi Mathema (c. 1929–2007), Nepali lyricist, singer, and composer
