= Sameer Maskey =

Computer scientist

Dr Sameer Maskey is a computer scientist, educator and entrepreneur. He is currently the Founder and CEO at Fusemachines Inc and an Adjunct Associate Professor at Columbia University.

== Biography ==
Maskey grew up in Kathmandu, Nepal. He attended undergraduate school at Bates College in Maine, USA with degrees in Math and Physics. After graduating from Bates he went on to pursue a PhD in Computer Science at Columbia University in New York City. Maskey has more than 20 papers published in International Conferences and Journals along with 9 pending/granted patents. Maskey has served as a session chair, a program committee member, and a review committee member of many international conferences including ACL, HLT, ICASSP, Interspeech, NAACL and COLING.

Maskey founded the company, Fusemachines, in 2013. The company aims to make artificial intelligence technology accessible to underserved communities around the world by providing AI education programs AI job opportunities, and an AI platform that helps schools provide AI Assisted Learning.
