= Munankarmi =

Munankarmi (Munakarmi/मुनंकर्मी) is Newar surname which includes significant group of population. This clan system was originated in Kathmandu Valley, Nepal during Malla dynasty. According to some facts, they served for Malla king (जुजु) as a royal dresser after the reformation of the caste system. It is one of the clan of the higher caste system in Newar Community (which goes along with Shrestha, Joshi, Baidhya, and so on.)

== Background ==
Before 1769, they were called Chetriya/Kshetri/Chhetri (warrior) of Newar Caste System and placing themselves in higher -caste aristocratic Kshatriyas for serving the nation and people. Hence, they are a (sub) clan made of the Chhathariya caste system and their descendants still worship SWORD along with other gods and goddess during their main festival called Dashain/Dasain.

It is very tiny sub-clan of Newar located precisely in Kathmandu Valley and locally in Bhaktapur . After Shah Dynasty’s take over, this clan continued to serve people as merchants and/or traders. They also have Guthi (clan organization) for social purposes and promotion of festivals & rituals.

== Rituals and culture ==
Munankarmis are generally Hindu and celebrate most of the Newar and Hindu festivals such Dashain, Tihar, Bisket Jatra, Yomari Punhi, Maghe Sankranti, Gai Jatra, Nag Panchami, Siti Nakha, Holi, Shiva Ratri. Guthis of Munankarmi have different rituals and sacred way of serving Hindu Gods for celebration of festivals and holy parties.
