= Rajbhandari =

Rājbhandāri (Newar: 𑐬𑐵𑐖𑐨𑐞𑑂𑐜𑐵𑐬𑐷; Nepali: राजभण्डारी) is a Newar Chatharīya Srēstha clan residing primarily in Kathmandu Valley and other parts of Nepal. It is said that the Malla king Jayasthiti Malla appointed treasurers to look after the wealth. The king honored them with the title of “Bhandari”. As time passed, the bhandari were replaced by the Raj-bhandari. By 17th CE, Rajbhandari was a prominent aristocratic clan serving as courtiers & military chiefs in the Malla courts. Similarly, Rajbhandaris are appointed as the traditional treasurers, the chief non-Vedic assistant-priests of Pashupatinath Temple of Kathmandu and military leaders. Presently, 108 Rajbhandaris perform rituals as assistant priests and chief patrons of the various temples in the Pashupati area.

Rajbhandaris are descendants of the Suryavansha and Agnivansha Rajput kings who migrated to the Kathmandu valley during Malla rule, and presently, Rajbhandaris belong to the high-caste Kshatriya (pronounced Chathariya) Newārs, marrying among other clans such as Malla (मल्ल), Māskay (मास्के), Joshi (जोशी), Pradhānanga (प्रधानांग), Pradhān (प्रधान), Acharya/Karmāchārya (आचार्य), Amātya (अमात्य), Vaidhya (वैद्य), etc. They are considered as “Brahmaputra Kshatri (ब्रह्मपुत्र क्षत्री)” who are required to wear “Janai” (the sacred thread) around their neck. In modern times, the tradition became less strict. Surnames "Bhani (भनी)", "Bhari (भारी)", "Bhariju (भारिजु)", "Talchabhari (ताल्चाभारी)", "Bhandel/Bhadel (भँडेल/भदेल)" are all local variants of "Rajbhandari".

Originally, three types of Rajbhandari lived in Nepal according to their “Gotra” (lineage) and the social status

- Rajbhandari of Bhadgaon (Bhaktapur): Bhāradwaja
- Rajbhandari of Kantipur (Kathmandu): Kāsyapa
- Rajbhandari of Lalitpattan (Lalitpur): Kashi
- Rajbhandari of Salyan (migrated from Te Bahal, Kathmandu) gotra Kasyapa

== Notable people ==
- Gehendra Bahadur Rajbhandari (1923–1994) "Senior Minister", acting Prime Minister of Nepal, 1970–71
- Phatteman Rajbhandari (1936–2013), Nepali singer and musician
- Kaji Manik Lal Rajbhandari (1880–?), Bada Kaji, senior bureaucrat
- Divya Mani Rajbhandari (born 1955), philanthropist and politician, member of Parliament of Federal Parliament of Nepal
