= Maskey =

Maskey is a surname. Notable people with the surname include:

- Alex Maskey (born 1952), Irish politician
- Chandra Man Singh Maskey (1900–1984), Nepalese artist
- Deeya Maskey, Nepalese movie actress
- Paul Maskey (born 1967), Irish republican politician
- Sameer Maskey, computer scientist
- Sarina Maskey (born 1987), Nepalese beauty queen
- Shanti Maskey (1928–2011), Nepali actress
- Shilpa Maskey (born 1992), Nepalese film actress
- Supriya Maskey (born 2000), Nepalese beauty queen
- Umesh Maskey, Nepalese boxer
- Om Kumar Maskey, Nepalese boxer
