= Tagadhari =

Hindu castes wearing sacred thread

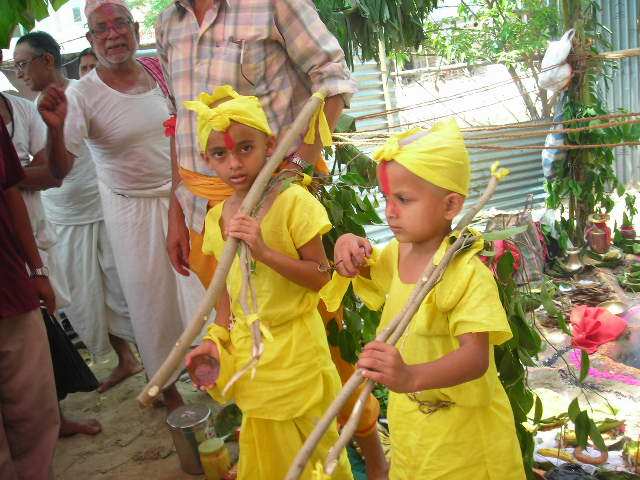
Two Nepalese boys on the verge of becoming Tagadharis (sacred thread bearers), participating in the "sacred thread" ceremony

Tagadhari (Nepali: तागाधारी, lit. 'Wearers of the Holy Thread') are members of a Nepalese Hindu group that is perceived as historically having a high socio-religious status in society. Tagadhari are identified by a sacred thread (Janai) around the torso, which is used for ritualistic purposes in Hinduism. In Sanskrit the sacred thread is called yajñopavītam and in Nepali Janai (Nepali: जनै). The cord is received after the Upanayana ceremony. Tagadharis were historically favoured by the government of Nepal and various religious and caste-based legal provisions were enacted on their behalf.

The legal code of 1854, Muluki Ain, which was introduced by Chhetri Maharaja and Prime Minister of Nepal Narsingh Jang Bahadur Kunwar Ranaji, made it impossible to legally enslave Tagadharis and decreed fewer punishments for them in comparison to Matawali (liquor drinkers) and Dalits.

== Background ==
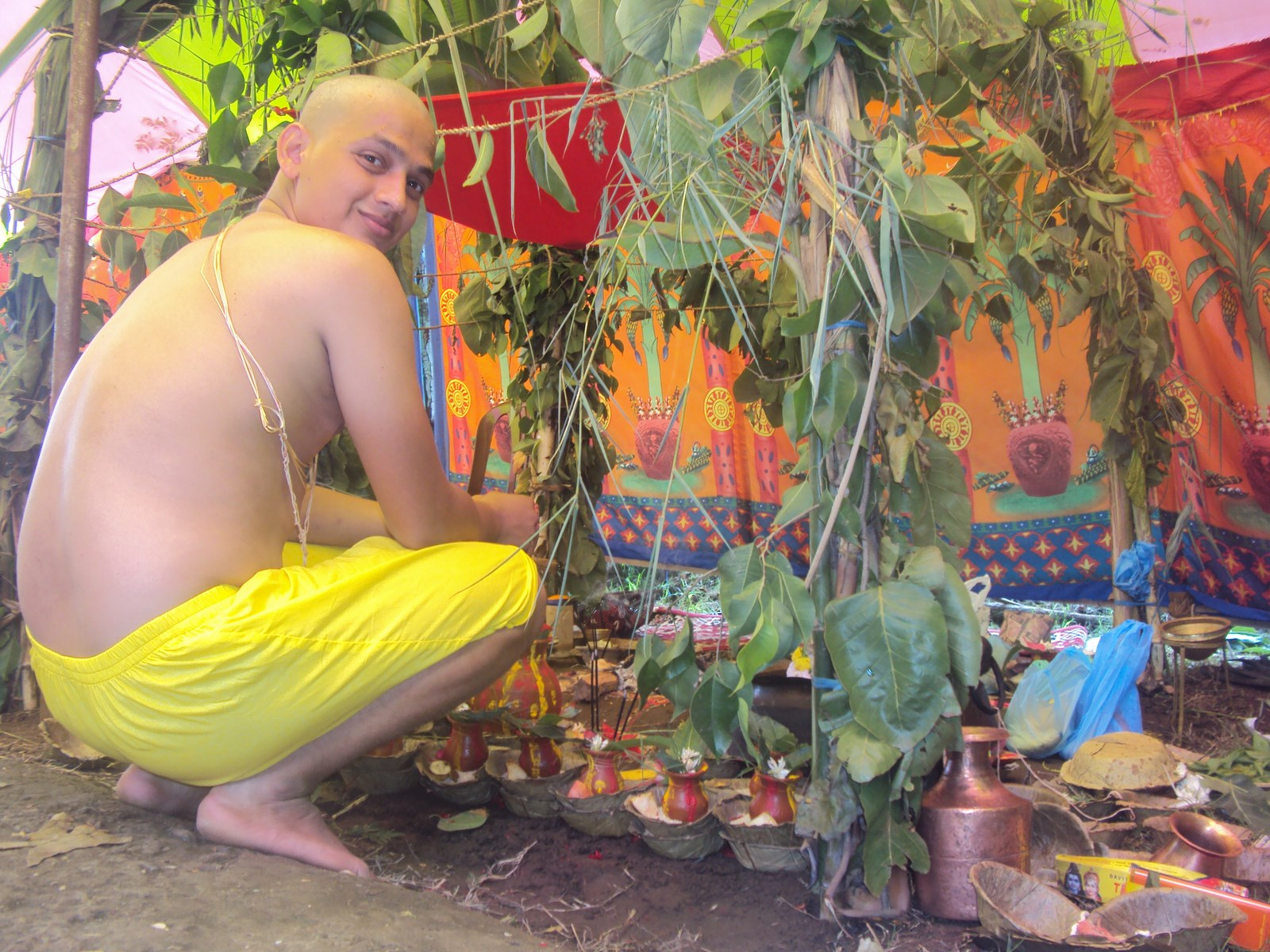
A Brahmin man wearing the Janai (sacred thread) at the Bratabandha ceremony in Nepal

Tagadhari means "wearers of the sacred thread" or "wearers of the holy cord". The sacred thread called Yajñopaveetam is bestowed during the Upanayana ceremony. Upanayana is an elaborate ceremony that includes rituals involving the family, the child, and the teacher. The ceremony is a rite of passage for the start of formal education in reading, writing, arithmetic, Vedangas, arts, and other skills.

=== Eligibility criteria ===
Many medieval-era texts discuss the sacred thread ceremony in the context of only three varnas (caste, class): Brahmins, Kshatriyas, and Vaishyas. In the modern era, the Upanayana rite of passage is open to anyone at any age.

=== Sacred thread ===
The "sacred thread" (Sanskrit: यज्ञोपवीतम् yajñopavītam or upavīta) is a thin cord, composed of three cotton strands. Two ancient Sanskrit texts offer a divergent view in their description of the yajñopavītam or upavita. The term upavita was originally meant to be any upper garment, as stated in verse 2.2.4.22–2.2.4.23 of Apastamba Dharmasutra or, if the wearer did not want to wear a top, a thread would suffice. The thread identified a person who was studying at a school or had graduated. The Gobhila Gryha Sutra similarly states, at verse 1.2.1 in its discussion on Upanayana, that "the student understands the yajnopavita as a cord of threads, or a garment, or a rope of kusa grass", and it is the method by which the yajnopavita is worn and its significance that matters. The proper manner of wearing the upper garment or thread, state the ancient texts, is over the left shoulder and under the right arm.

=== The Dvija status of Tagadharis ===
Upanayana is a ceremony in which a guru (teacher) accepts and draws a child towards knowledge and initiates the second birth, that is, of the young mind and spirit. Thus, the person completing the Upanayana ceremony and receiving the sacred thread is referred to as Dvija (twice-born).

== History ==
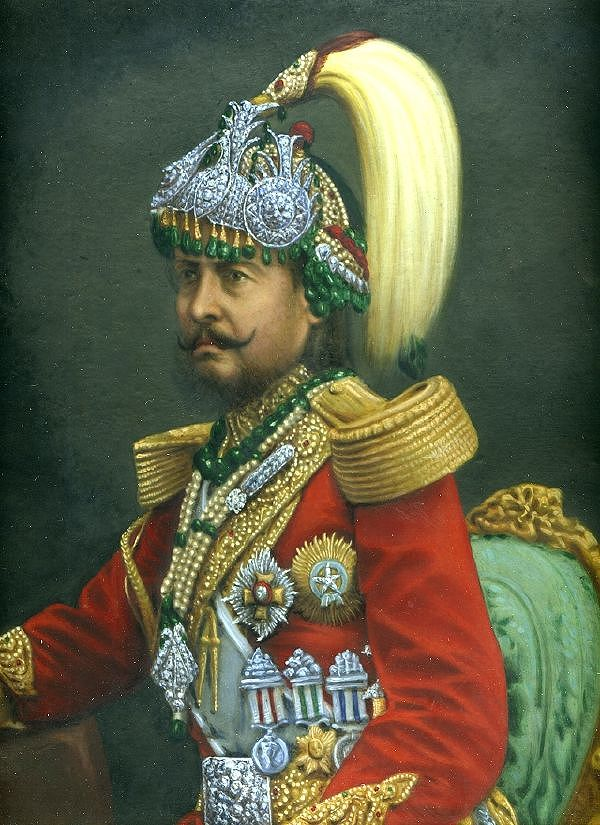
Jung Bahadur Kunwar Rana highly prioritized Tagadhari castes in the civil code Muluki Ain published in 1854 A.D.

After the Gorkhali conquest of the Kathmandu Valley, King Prithvi Narayan Shah expelled the Christian Capuchin missionaries from Patan and renamed Nepal as Asil Hindustan (pure land of Hindus). The Tagadharis enjoyed a privileged status in the Nepalese capital and greater access to the authorities following these events. Subsequently, Hinduisation became the main policy of the Kingdom of Nepal. Prof. Harka Gurung speculates that the presence of Islamic Mughal rule and Christian British rule in India compelled the foundation of Brahmin Orthodoxy in Nepal for the purpose building a haven for Hindus in the Kingdom of Nepal.

The Nepali civil code, Muluki Ain, was commissioned by Jung Bahadur Rana after his European tour and enacted in 1854. It was rooted in traditional Hindu Law and codified social practices for several centuries in Nepal. The law also comprised Prāyaścitta (avoidance and removal of sin) and Ācāra (the customary law of different castes and communities). It was an attempt to include the entire Hindu as well as the non-Hindu population of Nepal of that time into a single hierarchic civic code from the perspective of the Khas rulers. The Muluki Ain divided the Nepalese into five main castes:

1. Tagadhari (the cord-wearing high caste Hindus),
2. Namasinya Matwali (non-enslavable drinking castes),
3. Masinya Matwali jat (enslavable drinking castes),
4. Pani Na Chalne Chhoichito Halnu Naparne (water non-acceptable but ritually not polluting caste),
5. Pani Na Chalne Chhoichito Halnu Parne (water non-acceptable and ritually polluting caste).

The Nepalese jati arrangement in terms of Hindu varna takes the Tagadhari to be the highest in the hierarchy. The ethnolinguistic group of people of Mongoloid origin were tagged under the title Matwali ("Liquor Drinkers"), while those of Indo-Aryan origin were termed Tagadhari ("Wearers of the Sacred Thread"). The Tagadhari castes consisted of the three upper varna: Brahmin, Kshatriya and Vaishya. The civil code stated that if members of the Tagadhari castes consumed food and water touched by a person from the Pani Na Chalne Chhoichhito Halnuparne (Impure and Untouchable) category, then the member should undergo a purification process. Assault upon Tagadhari castes was fined heavily and a perpetrator from lower in the social hierarchy could be punished with enslavement per the Muluki Ain. The Tagadhari castes could not be enslaved following any criminal punishment unless they had been expelled from the caste. The main broad caste categories in Nepal are Tagadharis (sacred thread bearers), Matwalis (liquor drinkers) and Dalits (or untouchables).

== Tagadhari castes ==
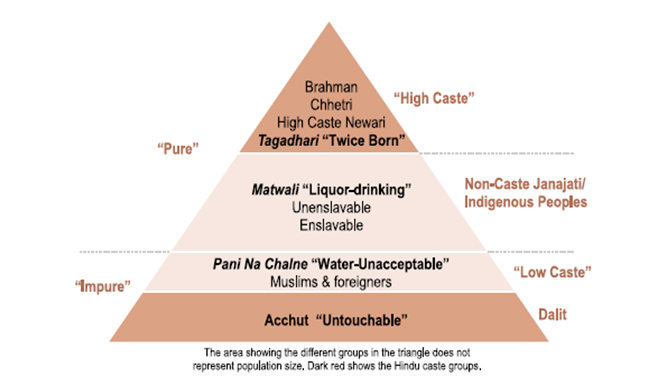
Tagadhari castes in the Muluki Ain of Nepal, 1854

Tagadhari castes in Nepal according to Muluki Ain (1854):

Ethnic Groups	Castes
Khas	Bahun (Kanyakubja Brahmin), Chhetri (Kshatriya), (Thakuri), (Rajput are also included in Thakuri)
Newar	Kanyakubja Rajopadhyay and Chatharīya Srēstha;
Terai/Madheshi	Brahmin {Maithil Brahmin, Bhumihar, Kanyakubja Brahmin & Bhatta Deshi Brahmin (South Indian origin)} (Note: Terai Brahmins were referred in the 1854 A.D. Muluki Ain code as Indian Brahmin.)

== Diet and tradition ==
The main diet of the Tagadhari consists of rice while Matwali prefer millet. The Tagadhari eat more milk-based foods in comparison to the Matwali preference for meat-based foods. The Tagadhari follow Hindu festivals while the Matawali follow Buddhist festivals. Brahmins and Chhetris do not practice any kind of cousin marriages while Thakuris practice maternal cross-cousin marriages frequently and paternal cross-cousin marriage is also allowed among them.

== Status and culture ==
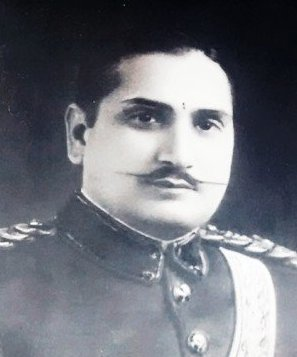
Portrait of a Chhetri aristocrat from the 20th century

The three Tagadhari and Dvija castes among the Parbattias are Brahmin, Thakuri and Chhetri. These three Tagadhari castes were influential in political, social and religious developments in the Kingdom of Nepal. The royal Shah dynasty and their allied aristocrats are drawn from Thakuri and Chhetri families. Among the Parbattia Tagadharis, Brahmins (Bahun) enjoy the highest hierarchical rank, with their major occupations being governmental services, agriculture and priestly works. Thakuris are politically and socially ahead of others and have been developed from the miscegenation of Khas, Magars and some possible Indian Rajput immigrants. Chhetris have same genealogy as the Kumaoni and Garhwali Rajputs of Uttarakhand and Himachal Pradesh, collectively these three are known as Khas Rajputs in old times but today it is used very less.Major occupations of Chhetris include governmental services, agriculture and military. Chhetris and Thakuris claim descent from the ancient Indian Kshatriyas and form the ruling and warrior classes of Nepal.

The ethnicities of the officers at and above the Under-Secretary level in governmental positions of Nepal in 1969 showed Chhetri and Brahmin as dominant in the top two highest positions, with 102 (35.17%) and 97 (33.45%) officers respectively among the total of 290 officers. As per the Public Service Commission of Nepal, Brahmins (33.3%) and Chhetris (20.01%) were two largest caste group to obtain governmental jobs in the fiscal year 2017-18 even though 45% governmental seats are reserved for women, indigenous groups, Madhesis, Dalits, people with disability and those from the backward regions. Chhetris are highly dominant in the military sector of Nepal. Of the senior officers of the Nepal Army, 74.4% of the total in 1967 consisted of Chhetris. Similarly, Chhetris were 38.1%, 54.3% and 55.3% of the senior officers in the years 2003, 2004 and 2007 respectively.

=== Income and wealth ===
Tagadhari (NRs. 33,130.0) had the highest annual income (1991), followed by Matwalis (NRs.30,300.0) and untouchables (NRs. 25,910.0).

== Demographics ==
The population of Tagadhari castes as per 2011 Nepal census are as below:

Rank in Nepal	Castes (2011 Nepal census)	Population	Percentage composition
1	Kshetri/Chhetri	4,398,053	16.60%
2	Hill Brahmin/Bahun	3,226,903	12.18%
18	Tarai:-Kushwaha(past kshetriya)	355,707	1.22%
28	Brahmin-Tarai (Maithil, Bhumihar, Kanyakubja)	134,106	0.51%
54	Rajput(Terai Kshetriya)	41,972	0.16%

=== Dominance in civil services ===
As per the Public Service Commission of Nepal, Brahmins (33.3%) and Chhetris (20.01%) were two largest caste group to obtain governmental jobs in the fiscal year 2017-18 even though 45% of governmental seats are reserved for women, indigenous groups, Madhesis, Dalits, people with disability and those from the backward regions. Bahuns have a representation in the civil service which is 3.2 times that of their presence in the population; the fourth largest ratio in Nepal. The caste with the largest ratio, Rajputs, have a presence in the civil service that is 5.6 times that of their presence in the population. Terai Brahmins also have a presence in the civil service that is 3.2 times that of their presence in the population; this is the third highest ratio in Nepal.

=== Districtwise statistics ===
According to the 2011 Nepal census, Bahun or Brahmin-Hill appear as the second most populous group after Chhetri with 12.2% of Nepal's population (or 32,26,903 people). Bahun (Hill-Brahmins) are the second largest Hindu group with a population of 3,212,704 (99.6% of Bahuns). Hill-Brahmins are the largest group in 11 districts in Nepal: Jhapa, Morang, Kathmandu, Chitwan, Nawalparasi, Rupandehi, Kaski, Syangja, Parbat, Gulmi and Arghakhanchi. Among these, Bahuns in Parbat (35.7%), Arghakhanchi (32.8%), Syangja (30.9%), Chitwan (28.6%), Kaski (27.8%) and Gulmi (25.2%) consist more than 25% of the district population. Kathmandu has largest Bahun population with 410,126 people (23.5%).

Chhetris are largest caste group in 21 districts of Nepal as per the 2001 Nepal census and 24 districts as per the 2011 Nepal census. These twenty-four districts are: Dhankuta district, Sankhuwasabha district, Okhaldhunga district, Udayapur district, Ramechhap district, Dolakha District, Salyan district, Surkhet district, Dailekh district, Jajarkot district, Dolpa district, Jumla district, Mugu district, Humla district, Bajura district, Bajhang district, Achham district, Doti district, Kailali district, Dadeldhura district, Baitadi district, Darchula district, Kalikot district and Kanchanpur district. Among these, Chhetris in Bajhang (66.5%), Darchula (64.5%), Jumla (61.2%), Bajura (57.8%), Doti (57.7%), Kailali (57.7%), Salyan (57.0%), Achham (55.5%), Dadeldhura (53.6%) and Baitadi (52.2%) consist more than 50% of the district population. The district with largest Chhetri population is Kathmandu district with 347,754 people (i.e. 19.9% of the total district population). The literacy rate among Chhetris is 72.3% as per the 2011 Nepal census.

== See also ==
- Hinduism in Nepal
- History of Hinduism

== Books ==
- Sherchan, Sanjay (2001). Democracy, pluralism and Change: An Inquiry into Nepalese context. Chhye Pahhuppe. ISBN 9789993354390.
- German, Laura; Ramisch, Joshua J.; Verma, Ritu (2010). Beyond the Biophysical: Knowledge, Culture, and Power in Agriculture and Natural Resource Management. Springer Science & Business Media. ISBN 9789048188260.
- Skinner, Debra; Pach III, Alfred; Holland, Dorothy (1998). Selves in Time and Place: Identities, Experience, and History in Nepal. Rowman & Littlefield Publishers. ISBN 9780847685998.
- Leslie, Julia (2003). Authority and Meaning in Indian Religions: Hinduism and the Case of Vālmīki. Ashgate Publishing, Ltd. p. 189. ISBN 978-0-7546-3431-7.
- Messerschmidt, Donald Alan (1992). Muktinath: Himalayan pilgrimage, a cultural & historical guide. Sahayogi Press.
- Dharam Vir (1988). Education and Polity in Nepal: An Asian Experiment. Northern Book Centre. ISBN 978-81-85119-39-7.
- Adhikari, Indra (2015), Military and Democracy in Nepal, Routledge, ISBN 9781317589068
- Borgström, Bengt-Erik (1980), The patron and the panca: village values and pancayat democracy in Nepal, Vikas House, ISBN 9780706909975
- Stone, Linda (1988), Illness Beliefs and Feeding the Dead in Hindu Nepal: An Ethnographic Analysis, E. Mellen, ISBN 9780889460607
- Kara, Siddharth (2012), Bonded Labor: Tackling the System of Slavery in South Asia, Columbia University Press, ISBN 9780231528016
