= Amatya =

Surname list

Amatya is a surname of Sanskrit origin. The name originates from the Sanskrit Amatya (अमात्य), meaning councilor or minister.

== Notable people ==
- Lamu Amatya, Nepali nurse
- Madan Bahadur Amatya, Nepali politician
- Milan Amatya, Nepali singer
- Ramchandra Pant Amatya, Maratha Prime Minister
- Ronali Amatya, Nepali model
- Siddhidas Amatya, Nepali poet
- Tulsi Lal Amatya, Nepali politician
