= Dhruvadeva =

7th-century King of Nepal

King of Nepal
- Reign: 624–630
- Predecessor: Udaydeva
- Successor: Bhimarjunadeva
- Issue: Bhimarjunadeva
- Dynasty: Lichchhavi
- Father: Shivadeva I
- Religion: Hinduism

Dhruvadeva, also spelled Dhruva Deva, (Nepali: ध्रुव देव) was a son of Shivadeva I of the Licchavi dynasty and a king of Nepal in the 7th century. He deposed his brother Udaydeva with the help of Jishnu Gupta and reigned as a figurehead monarch.

== Life ==
After the death of Amshuverma, Udaydeva had become the king in 621 CE. However, in 624, Dhruvadeva, along with Jishnu Gupta exiled Udaydeva and his family to Tibet. Dhruvadeva became the king but he did not have any powers and Jishnu Gupta was the highest authority in the realm. Dhruvadeva resided in Mangriha while Jishnu Gupta ruled from Kailashkut Bhawan.

Dhruvadeva, and later his son, Bhimarjunadeva are only referred to as a person leading a nation, and the highest titles were given to Jishnu Gupta. The following two addresses, given to Dhruvadeva "embody the most unostentatious form of address ever ascribed to a sovereign", opiniates historian D.R Regmi.

- अनेक विजयानन्त प्रतिष्ठा पृथिवीराजकर्मणा लिच्छवी कुलकेतुः
  - Translation: Lichchhavi Kulaketu, through numerous conquests, established his authority on the earth.
- सकल सत्वानुग्रहित मनोहिराभिमान रमणीयं चरितं लिच्छवी कुलकेतुः
  - Translation: Lichchhavi Kulaketu, with a charming character that captured the hearts of all, favored by all living beings.

Dhruvadeva died in around 630, and his son replaced him as a nominal king.

Preceded by Udaydeva	King of Nepal; 624–630	Succeeded by Bhimarjunadeva
