= Jishnu Gupta =

7th-century de facto ruler of Nepal

De facto ruler of Nepal
- Reign: 624–637
- Issue: Vishnu Gupta
- Dynasty: Abhira-Gupta
- Religion: Hinduism

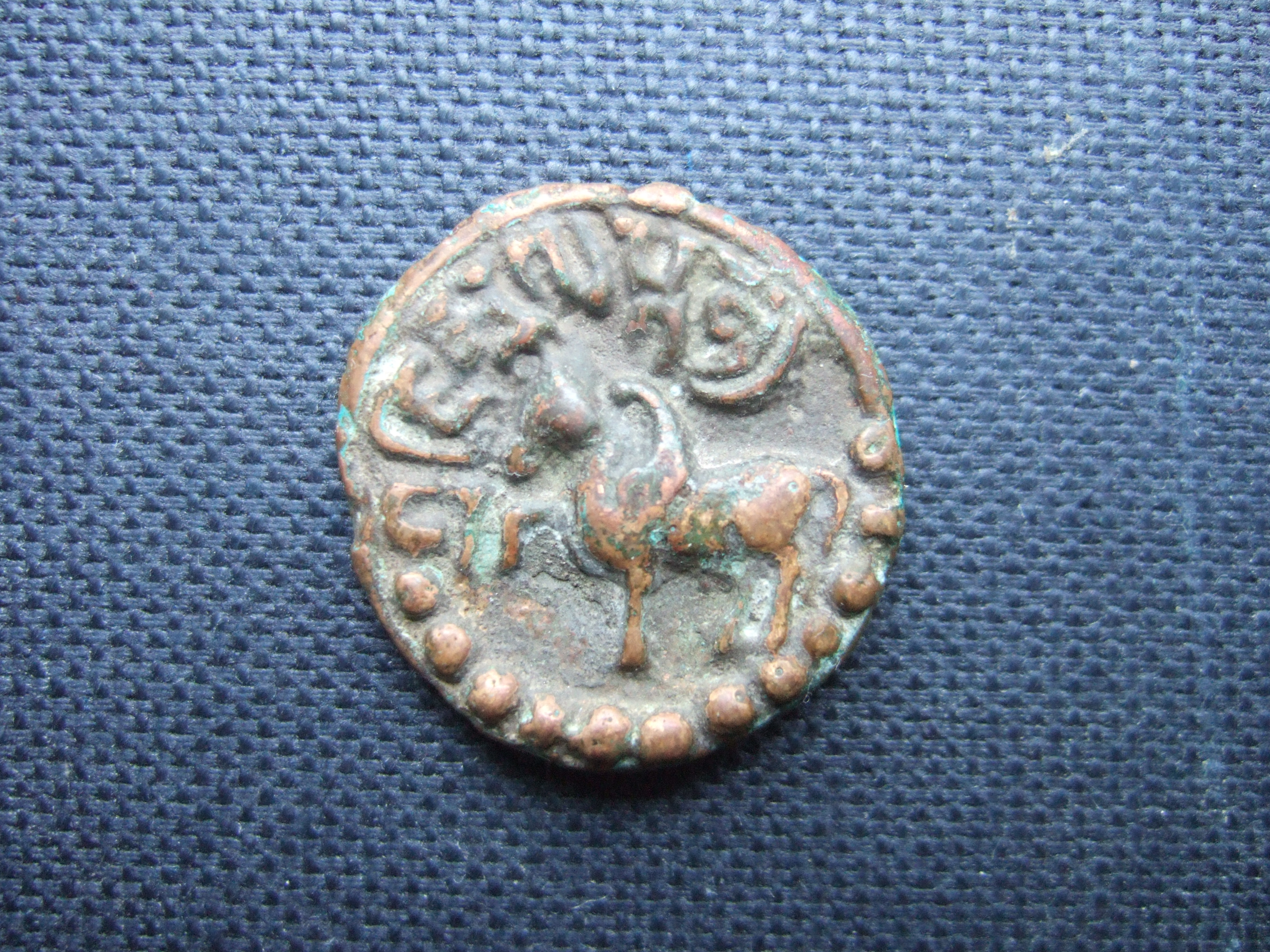
Copper coin of Jishnu Gupta (c. 622–633) of Abhira-Gupta dynasty. Obverse. The inscription above the winged horse is Sri Jishnu Guptasya

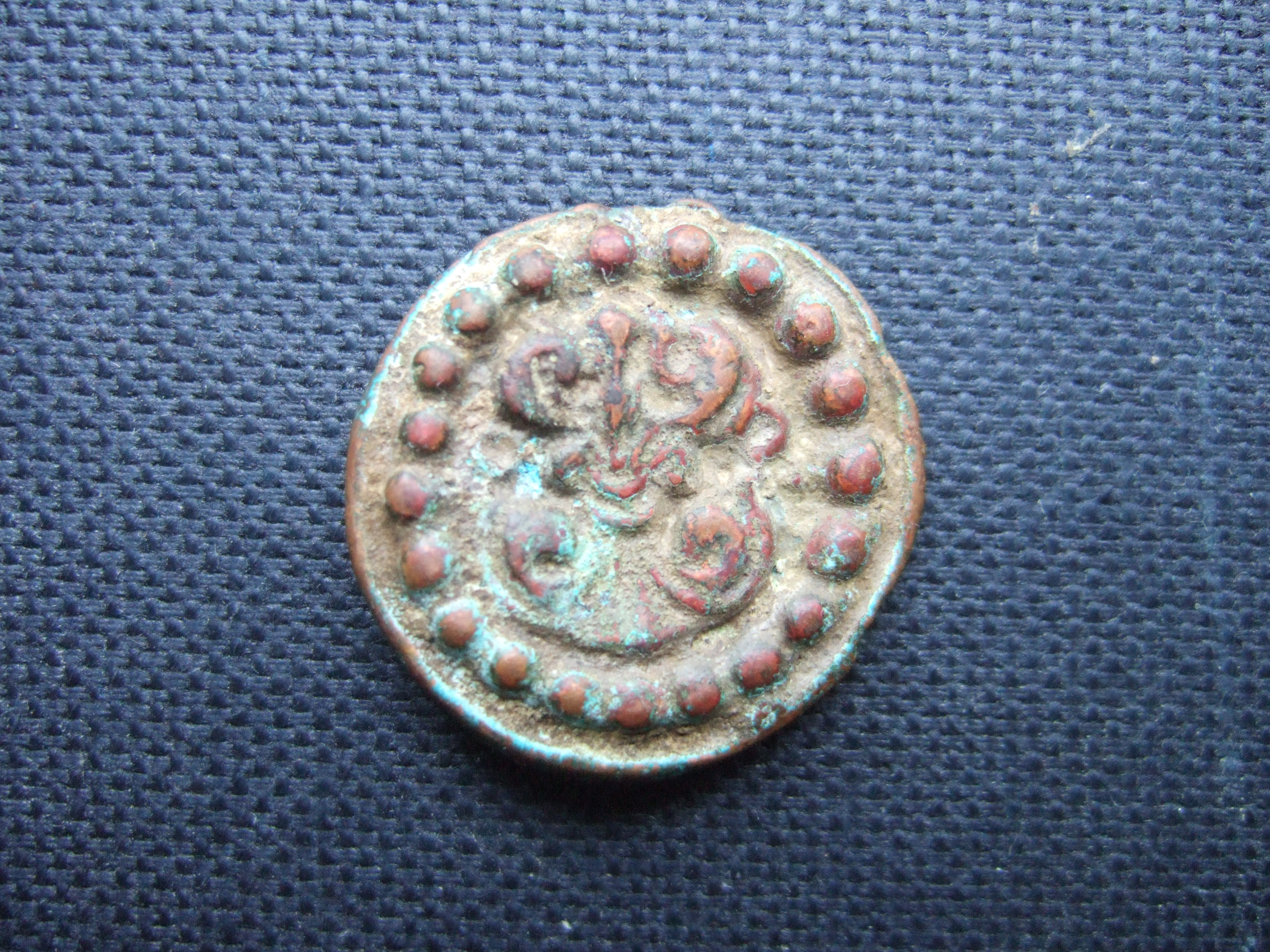
Copper coin of Jishnu Gupta (c. 622–633) of Abhira-Gupta dynasty. Reverse

Jishnu Gupta, often spelled Jishnugupta, (Nepali: जिष्णु गुप्त) was a de facto ruler of Nepal in the 7th century during the time of the Lichchhavi dynasty. Initially sharing the administrative powers with Dhruvadeva from 624 CE, he became the highest authority in the realm from around 627. He belonged to the Abhira-Gupta dynasty.

== Usurpation ==
Amshuverma had appointed his brother-in-law Udaydeva as the monarch and after the death of the former, the latter became the king in 621. He was soon ousted along with his family to Tibet, and his brother Dhruvadeva, with the help of Jishnu Gupta proclaimed the throne. Even though Dhruvadeva was the official monarch, Jishnu Gupta exercised much of the authority and from around 627, Jishnu ruled as a de facto ruler.

== Reign ==
He issued several coins with his name beginning from 627, and at least ten inscriptions have been found starting from 616 related to the same. Almost all of his inscriptions substantiate his reign as a de facto ruler under the powerless Lichchhavi monarchs Dhruvadeva, and later his son, Bhimarjunadeva. The Lichchhavis resided at Managriha palace and Jishnu Gupta ruled from Kailashkut Bhawan. The following two addresses, given to the monarch Dhruvadeva "embody the most unostentatious form of address ever ascribed to a sovereign", opiniates historian D.R Regmi.

== Personal life ==
Jishnu Gupta was a grandson of Abhir Bhauma Gupta who, probably, also ascended to the highest authority during the reign of Ganadeva. He died in c. 639 and was succeeded by the de facto rule of his son Vishnu Gupta with Bhimarjuna as the figurehead monarch.
