= Bhimarjunadeva =

7th-century King of Nepal

King of Nepal
- Reign: 630–643
- Predecessor: Dhruvadeva
- Successor: Narendradeva
- Dynasty: Lichchhavi
- Father: Dhruvadeva
- Religion: Hinduism

Bhimarjunadeva (Nepali: भीमार्जुन देव) was a son of Dhruvadeva of the Licchavi dynasty and a king of Nepal in the 7th century. He succeeded his father in c. 630 and reigned as a figurehead monarch.

== Life ==
Dhruvadeva died in around 630 CE and Bhimarjuna became the king. Like his father, however, his reign was only nominal. Jishnu Gupta, who helped Dhruvadeva in claiming the throne, exercised full authority on the kingdom.

In around 640 CE, Jishnu Gupta died but his son Vishnu Gupta, soon took his place and wielded higher authority than Bhimarjunadeva. Bhimarjunadeva continued to rule as a figurehead until around 643 CE. Narendradeva, son of Udaydeva, returned from Tibet and with its help, took control of the kingdom which had been lost to his father.

Preceded by Dhruvadeva	King of Nepal; 630–643	Succeeded by Narendradeva
