= Jishnu =

Jishnu is an Indian given name. Notable people with the name include:

- Jishnu Dev Varma, Indian politician
- Jishnu Gupta, 7th-century ruler of Nepal
- Jiṣṇu, one of the names of Arjuna, a protagonist of the Mahabharata
