= Duwakot =

Duwakot दुवाकोट
- Village of Changunarayan Municipality
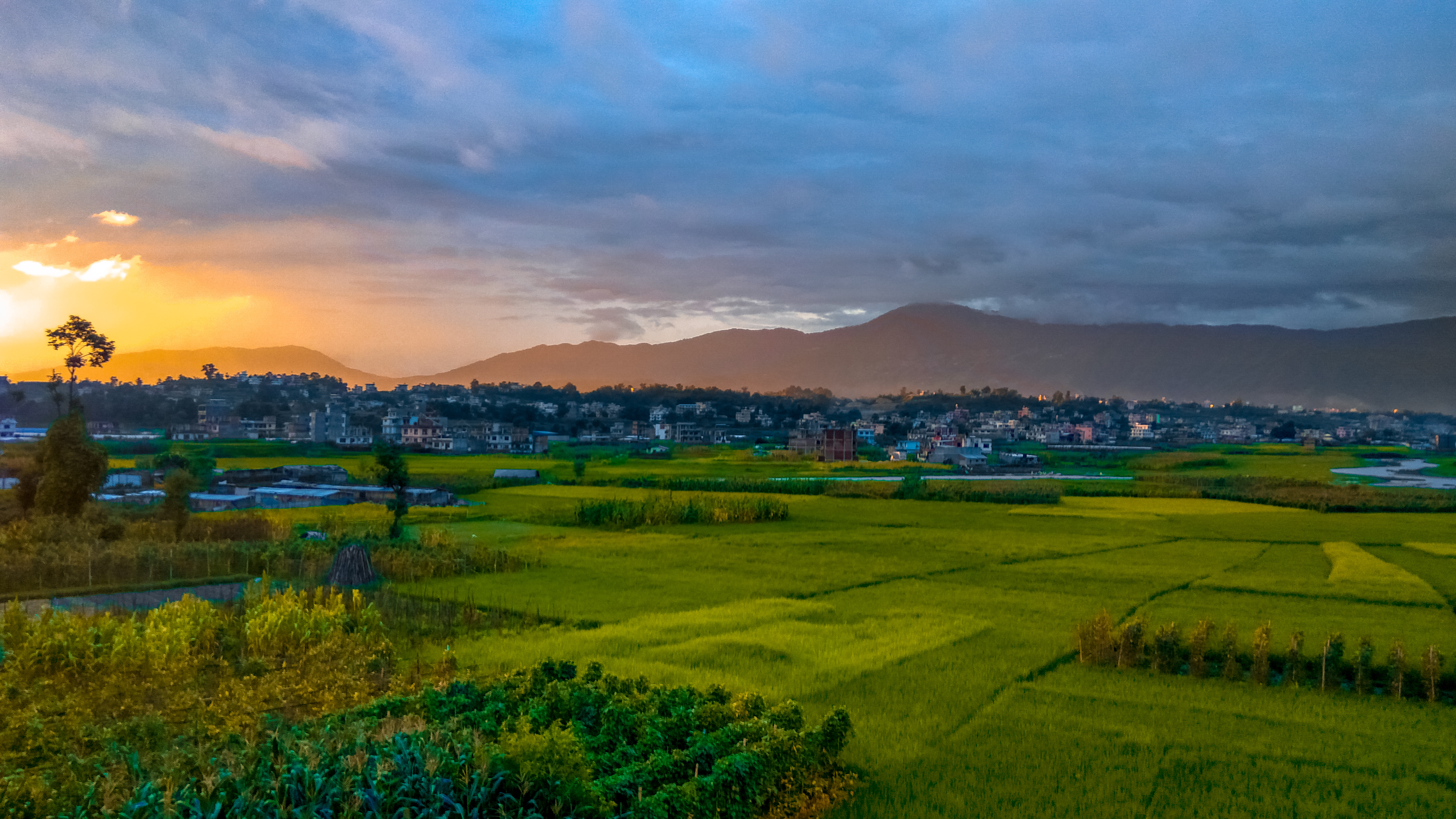

- Location in Nepal
- Coordinates: 27.70°N 85.41°E
- Country: Nepal
- Province: Bagmati Province
- District: Bhaktapur

Population (1991)
  - Total: 5,157
  - Religions: Hinduism Buddhism
- Time zone: UTC+5:45 (Nepal Time)
- Postal code: 44802
- Area code: 01

Duwakot (Nepali: दुवाकोट) is a settlement and former Village Development Committee—now part of Changunarayan municipality, located in Bhaktapur district of Bagmati Province in central Nepal. At the time of the 1991 Nepal census, it had a population of 5,157 with 905 houses in it.

== Geography ==
It is located near the Changunarayan temple, on the shore of holy river Manohara. It is surrounded by Bhaktapur Municipality in the south and Madhyapur Thimi Municipality in the west. It is about 20 km away from centre of Kathmandu. It is located on the north of the valley. About 90% of the population is educated. Most of the people are employee in government organization. Electricity facility was started from the late 1930s.

Duwakot had 9 ward. The V.D.C. office was located at Ward No. 3. Jagaran Samuha is the oldest club of Duwakot established during early 1930s, located at the border of Ward no. 4 and 6.

It is currently a part of Changunarayan municipality.

== Education ==
Nepal Engineering college, and Kathmandu Medical College are the major educational institutes located in Duwakot. The oldest High school of the region, Shree Changunarayan Madhyamik Vidyalaya was established in 2006 BS (1949–1950).
