= Battle of Chabuheluo =

7th-century conflict in South Asia

Date	648 AD
Location	Champaran (Present-day Bihar, India)
Result	Tang alliance victory

Belligerents
Tang dynasty; Tibetan Empire; Licchavis of Nepal	Kingdom of Kannauj

Commanders and leaders
Wang Xuance; Jiang Shiren	Arunasva (POW)

Strength
1,200 Tibetan soldiers; 7,000+ Nepalese cavalrymen	Unknown

Casualties and losses
Unknown	3,000+ beheaded; 10,000+ drowned; 2,000 captured

The Battle of Chabuheluo (Chinese: 茶鎛和羅城之戰) was a battle that took place between an alliance led by the Tang dynasty and the Kingdom of Kannauj in 648 AD.

== Background ==
Wang Xuance was one of the several envoy officials sent by the Tang dynasty to India in the 7th century and made multiple visits during the time. In 643, he was first sent to India by Emperor Taizong of Tang as an assistant to imperial ambassador Li Yibiao. They travelled to India via Tibet and Nepal. In Magadha, they met emperor Harsha.

During the time, Songtsen Gampo had established the Tibetan Empire which previously had not only overwhelmed the tribes around the Tibetan plateau and made raids on Chinese towns but even subjugated the Licchavis of Nepal. Later Tibet entered a marriage alliance with Tang through Songsten's marriage to Princess Wencheng in 641. The previous actions of Tibet concerned both Taizong and Harsha which lead to Taizong responding to Harsha's mission request to establish diplomatic ties. As a result, there were no hostilities related to any of the parties and therefore good relations until 647.

In 647, Wang and his delegation made another visit to Kannauj. On arrival to the capital, they found out Harsha had died and that his minister Arunasva had usurped the throne. The mission was not well received by the new ruler and was attacked by his forces. Everyone was either killed or captured except for Wang and his second-in-command Jiang Shiren. They escaped overnight to Nepal which was allied to China through Tibet.

== Battle ==
Songtsen and Narendradeva agreed to provide a force of 1,200 Tibetan soldiers and over 7,000 Nepalese cavalrymen to support Wang.

In 648, Wang's army led an attack on Arunasva. Sources put the site of the battle as Chabuheluo (believed to be Champaran) on the banks of the river Qiantuowei (believed to be Gandaki River).

According to the Old Book of Tang, the fighting lasted for three days where the troops led by Wang overpowered their enemies. Over 3,000 people were beheaded and those who jumped in the water and died by drowning numbered over 10,000. Arunasva fled the city but Jiang captured him. In addition 2,000 men and women were captured alongside over 30,000 cows and horses.

== Aftermath ==
Wang returned to China taking Arunasva as a captive. For his success in battle, Wang was granted the title "Grand Master for the Closing Court". Arunasva remained in China until his death where he was given posthumous honors. A statue of him was created and placed on the avenue leading to Taizong's tomb in the Zhao Mausoleum.

There are two main outcomes of the battle. The first being the military power displayed by the Tang dynasty may have instigated Indian kingdoms to explore military ties with it. The second being the Tibetan empire venturing into the region originally controlled by Harsha to take advantage of the political vacuum.

Relations between Tang and Nepal greatly improved.

== Sources ==
- Sen, Tansen (1 January 2003). Buddhism, Diplomacy, and Trade: The Realignment of Sino-Indian Relations, 600-1400. University of Hawaii Press. ISBN 978-0-8248-2593-5.
- Bagchi, Prabodh Chandra (2011). India and China : interactions through Buddhism and diplomacy ; a collection of essays. Anthem Press. ISBN 978-93-80601-17-5.
- Singh, Upinder (2008). A History of Ancient and Early Medieval India: From the Stone Age to the 12th Century. Pearson Education India. ISBN 978-81-317-1677-9.
- Sircar, Dineschandra (1 January 1971). Studies in the Geography of Ancient and Medieval India. Motilal Banarsidass Publishing House. ISBN 978-81-208-0690-0.
- Shaha, Rishikesh (1992). Ancient and medieval Nepal. New Delhi: Manohar. ISBN 978-81-85425-69-6.
