= Narendradeva =

7th-century King of Nepal

King of Nepal
- Reign: 643–679
- Predecessor: Bhimarjunadeva
- Successor: Shivadeva II
- Issue: Shivadeva II
- Dynasty: Lichchhavi Dynasty
- Father: Udaydeva
- Religion: Hinduism

Narendradeva or Narendra Deva was a Licchavi king who ruled from 643 to 679. He was the son of Uday Deva. He initiated diplomatic relations with the Chinese emperor and oversaw the development of Nepal as a trade gateway between India and Tibet. Nepal in the reign of Narendra Deva was generally seen as a prosperous and powerful country. With the improved relation with China and Tibet, it was seen as a thriving centre by serving as a gateway from India to China for all kinds of people. It was around this time the art of paper making was introduced to Nepal from China. Nepal exported some finest quality handmade paper, along with musk, orpiment, blankets, etc. to India.

== Early life ==
Narendra Deva's father, Uday Deva, was ousted by his brother Dhruv Deva, and Jishnu Gupta in around 624 C.E. The family of Uday Deva fled to Tibet. After some time, an absolute rule of Jishnu Gupta started in Nepal which was succeeded by the joint rule of Bishnu Gupta, the son of Jishnu Gupta, and Bhimarjuna Deva, the son of Dhruv Deva. Narendra Deva, with the Tibetan Empire's help, reclaimed his ancestral throne from them in around 643 C.E.

== Battle against Arunasva ==
In around 648 C.E., an envoy from China, Wang Xuance arrived in India. Upon his arrival, he discovered that the King Harsha had died the previous year and Arunasva had usurped the throne. Arunasva attacked the emissaries and confiscated their gifts. After Wang Xuance fled from India, a joint force of 7,000 Nepalese mounted infantry and 1,200 Tibetian infantries attacked Arunasva at the Battle of Chabuheluo, captured him with his family and carried them off to China. Around 2000 prisoners were taken from Magadha by the Nepali and Tibetan forces under Wang. This event, along with the regular exchanges of emissaries, helped to improve the relations with Nepal and Tibet.

== Personal life ==
Narendra Deva adopted the same royal title (paramabhattaraka maharajadhiraj) as Amshuverma and was a devotee of Lord Shiva. According to a legend, he retired to a monastery in his old age and was succeeded on the throne by his son Shivadeva II.

Preceded by Bhimarjunadeva	King of Nepal; 643–679	Succeeded by Shivadeva II
