= Udaydeva =

7th-century King of Nepal

King of Nepal
- Reign: 621–624
- Predecessor: Amshuverma
- Deposed by: Dhruvadeva; Jishnu Gupta
- Issue: Narendradeva
- Dynasty: Lichchhavi
- Father: Shivadeva I
- Religion: Hinduism

Udaydeva (Nepali: उदय देव) was the son of Shivadeva I and a Lichchhavi king of Nepal. He succeeded Amshuverma in 621 CE but was soon ousted by Jishnu Gupta, and his brother Dhruvadeva. He is believed to be the father of Bhrikuti.

== Life ==
Udaydeva was a son of King Shivadeva I and thus a legitimate heir apparent of Nepal. But Amshuverma, a feudal lord, proclaimed full executive authority during the reign of Shivadeva I and himself reigned as a king from 598. Amshuverma, however, appointed Udaydeva as the crown prince and after the former died in 621, the latter became the king.

A coup plotted by Jishnu Gupta, of Abhira-Gupta dynasty, along with his brother Dhruvadeva in 624 forced him to flee to Tibet along with his family. In Nepal, Jishnu Gupta was the highest authority and Dhruvadeva was a mere figurehead king.

Udaydeva's death is not yet clearly known with many believing he died in Tibet. His son Narendradeva later brought Nepal under his control ousting the Guptas and the lineage of Dhruvadeva.

Preceded by Amshuverma	King of Nepal; 621–624	Succeeded by Dhruvadeva
