= Abhira-Gupta dynasty =

Ancient dynasty of Kathmandu valley, Nepal

- 6th century–7th century
- Capital: Kathmandu
- Common languages: Sanskrit
- Religion: Hinduism
- Government: Monarchy
- Maharaja
  - Unknown: Ravigupta
  - 567-590 A.D: Bhaumagupta
  - 622-637 A.D: Jishnugupta
  - 637-644 A.D: Vishnugupta
- History
  - Established: 6th century
  - Disestablished: 7th century
| Preceded by |
| Licchavi (kingdom) |

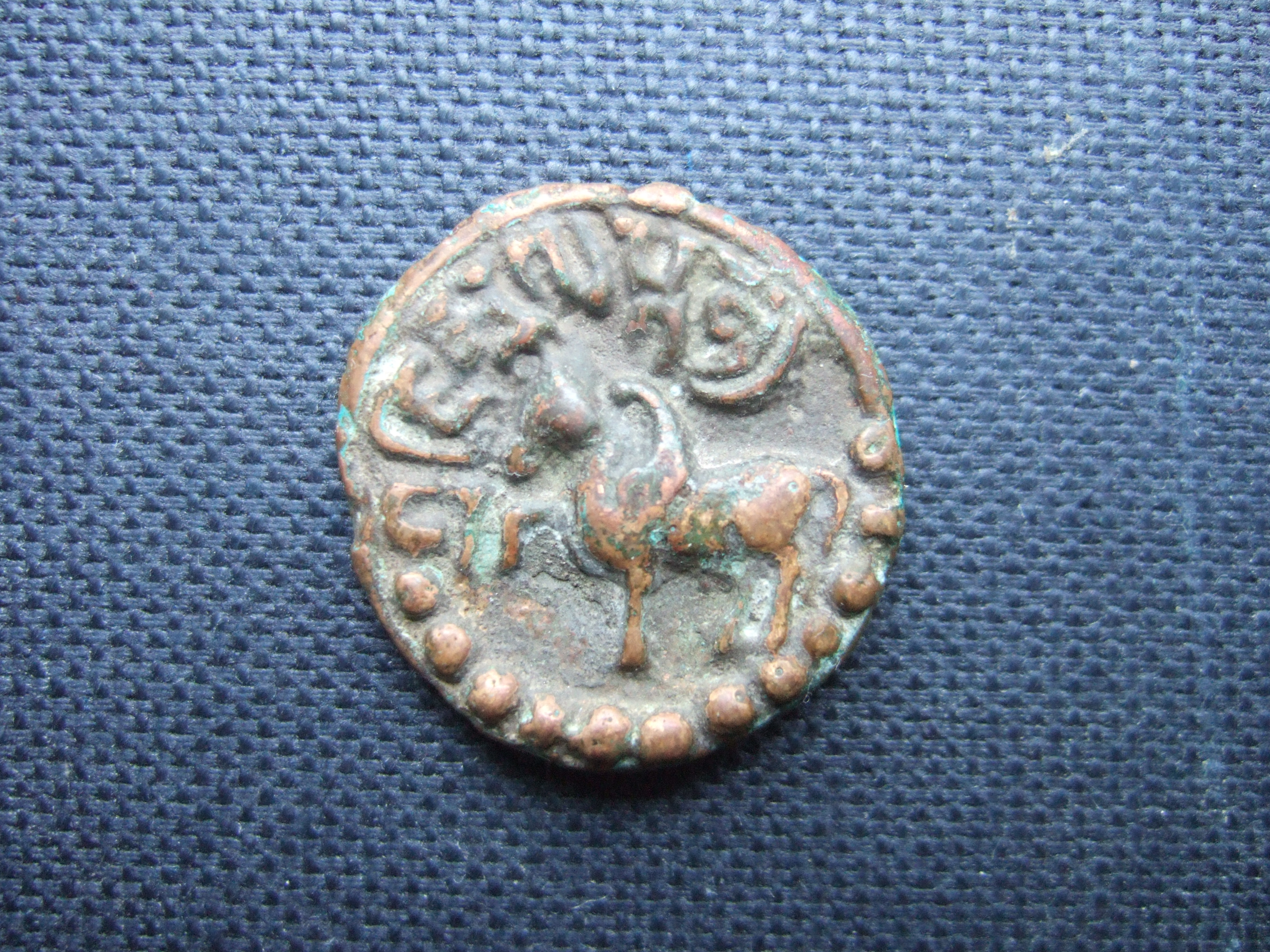
Copper coin of Jishnu Gupta (c. 622–633) of Abhira-Gupta dynasty. Obverse. The inscription above the winged horse is Sri Jishnu Guptasya

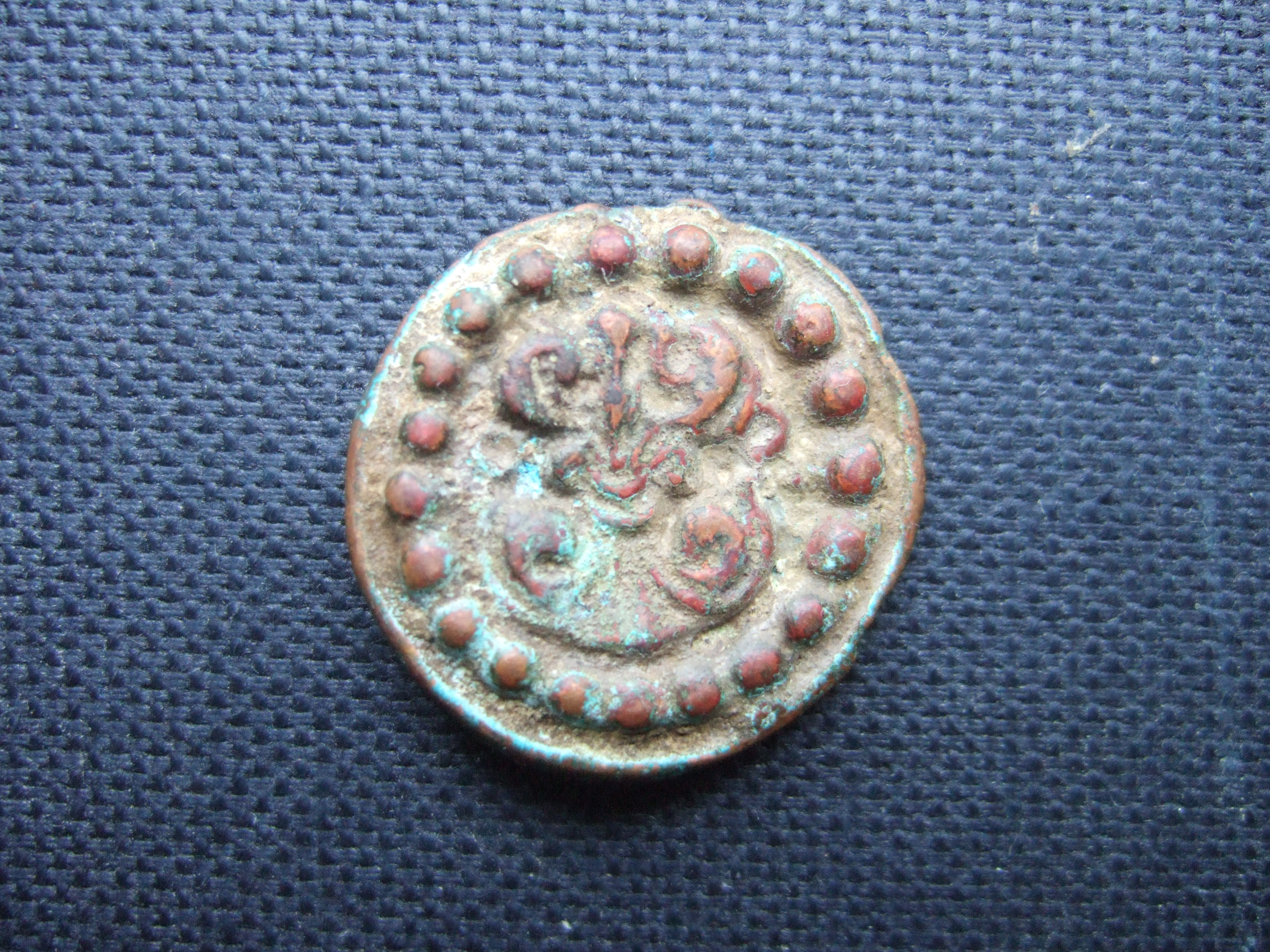
Copper coin of Jishnu Gupta (c. 622–633) of Abhira-Gupta dynasty. Reverse

The Abhira-Gupta dynasty was a dynasty which is believed to have existed in the Kathmandu Valley in modern-day Nepal. These Abhira-Guptas had overshadowed the Licchavi kings in the administration. Ravigupta, Bhaumagupta, Jishnugupta and Vishnugupta of Abhira-Gupta family controlled Kathmandu (Nepal) as de facto-ruler during many Lichchhavi kings.

== History ==
=== Early history ===
During the early Lichhavi period, the Abhiras (modern day Ahirs), who had migrated from the Mathura region of Northern India before the fifth century A.D., occupied the position of ever increasing rank in the administration.

The Abhira-Guptas were high official at Lichchhavi court until they usurped royal position.

=== Ravigupta ===
Ravigupta, the descent of Abhira-Gupta family was the first Abhira ruler (Abhinayaka) of Nepal. However, the Lichhavi King Basantdeva was still respected by all. The Abhira ruler gradually usurped the powers of the Lichhavi king.

Pasupati inscription of Abhiri Gomini confirms that Anuprama was the pen-name of Ravigupta Gomi. Abhirigomini was mother of Bhaumagupta, she had established Anuparmeshware Shivalinga and donated land, money and ornaments to the guthi.

=== Bhaumagupta ===
Bhaumagupta's name first appears in A.D 540 inscribed on a Shivalinga conserected by his mother Abhiri Gomini in the memory of her deceased husband, Anuprama. Few years later in A.D 557, we find Bhaumagupta simultaneously enjoying two of the highest governmental offices, Aide-de-camp (Mahapratihara) and Inspector General of Police (Sarvadandanayaka).

He was prime minister during the reign period of three Lichhavi kings, i.e. Ganadeva, Gangadeva and Sivadeva. His influence started during the reign of King Ganadeva and remain unchanged during the reign of King Gangdeva as well. The assuming of high title of Paramadaivataśri by Sarvadandanāyak Bhaumagupta reveals that the Licchavi rulers were being treated by him as no more than puppets.

Bhaumagupta was a de facto ruler until A.D 590, when King Sivadeva, the reigning Licchavi had, in fact, begun to assert his royal authority probably with the support of the Varman family.

The story of Abhira-Guptas family did not end with the illustrious Bhaumagupta, but continued with his descendants Jisnugupta and Vishnugupta. For after the hiatus during Amshuvarman's rule, circa A.D 605-621, when no Gupta or Gomin name is recorded, suddenly Bhaumagupta's grandson Jisnugupta, emerges as a forceful personality.

=== Jishnugupta ===
Udayadeva was overthrown by his younger brother Dhruvadeva with the help of Jishnugupta. This event must have taken place sometime around 624 A.D, since Udaydeva's inscription declaring him king is dated in the A.D 621. Three years later in year 624 A.D, Jishnugupta's first inscription appears and his usurpation of throne is proven. Jishnugupta first appears as joint ruler with Dhruvadeva in A.D 624-25 and then with Bhimarjundeva from 633 to 635 A.D. He probably ruled alone for some period of time. Two inscription name him sole ruler and coins were struck in his name.

According to Kevalpur and Thankot inscription, Jishnugupta was grandson of Bhaumagupta and great-grandson of a person known as Managupta Gomi. He wielded power between A.D 624 and 637, was a de facto ruler, though he continued the fiction of Licchavi sovereignty by placing on the throne Dhruvadeva and Bhimarjundeva. Jishnugupta issued coins in his own name. He not only inherited the dominions but also continued the policy and tradition of previous de facto rulers.

The Kevalpur inscription of King Jisnugupta clearly mentions that organised towns and village units with self-government existed in Nepal during the rule of the forefathers of Manadeva I.

Manadeva also lived with inferior position like Dhruvadeva till Jishnugupta was alive. Jishnugupta and his son Vishnugupta used the succeeding Licchavi kings as their puppets and maintained absolute rule for a total period of 22 years.

=== Vishnugupta ===
Jishnugupta was succeeded by his son Vishnugupta. He enjoyed a brief reign and must have been ousted from the throne by Narendradeva, who restored the Licchavi dynasty in Nepal in A.D 643 with the help of Tibetan king.

== List of rulers ==
The rulers of the Abhira-Gupta dynasty include:

- Ravigupta (532 A.D.)
- Bhaumagupta (567–590 A.D.)
- Jishnugupta (624–637 A.D.)
- Vishnugupta (638–643 A.D.)

== See also ==
- Gopala dynasty
- Gupta dynasty
- Mahisapala dynasty
- Licchavi (kingdom)
- Abhira people
- Ahir
