= Shivadeva II =

7th-century King of Nepal

King of Nepal
- Reign: 685–701
- Predecessor: Narendradeva
- Successor: Jayadeva II
- Spouse: Batsa Devi
- Issue: Jayadeva II
- Dynasty: Lichchhavi Dynasty
- Father: Narendradeva
- Religion: Hinduism

Shivadeva II (also spelled Sivadeva) was the son of Narendradeva and a king of the Licchavi dynasty who ruled Nepal in around 700 C.E.

== Reign ==
Shivadeva's reign started from 685 C.E. and ended in 701 C.E. He was succeeded by his son Jayadeva II.

== Personal life ==
He was married to Batsa Devi, the daughter of prince Bogvarma of Mankhari, and grand daughter of king Aditya Sen of Magadha. He was a devotee of Lord Shiva and also promoted the Mahayana Buddhism.

Preceded by Narendradeva	King of Nepal; 685–701	Succeeded by Jayadeva II
