= Vrsadeva =

King of ancient Nepal

Vrsadeva, or Vrasadeva, was a Licchavi king of Nepal who ruled from c.400–425.
