= Jayadeva II =

8th-century King of Nepal

King of Nepal
- Reign: 713–733
- Predecessor: Shivadeva II
- Spouse: Rajyavati
- Dynasty: Lichchhavi Dynasty
- Father: Shivadeva II
- Religion: Hinduism

Jayadeva II was the son of Shivadeva II and a king of the Licchavi dynasty who ruled Nepal from 713 to 733 CE.

== Reign ==
He is said to have ruled from 713 C.E. to somewhere around 733 C.E. He kept good relations with Tibet and India.

== Personal life ==
He was married to Rajyavati, the daughter of king Harshadeva of Pragjyotisha/Kamarupa.

== Subsequent history of Nepal ==
The historical records after the period of Jayadeva II are relatively unclear. The Lichchhavis are considered to have ruled until 879 after which Nepal was ruled by the Thakuri dynasty that continued until around 1200 C.E.

Preceded by Shivadeva II	King of Nepal; 713–733	Succeeded by Unknown
