= Jhaukhel =

Jhaukhel झौखेल
- Town in Changunarayan Municipality
- Nicknames: Sunderthali, Hanumantar
- Location in Nepal
- Coordinates: 27.69°N 85.43°E
- Country: Nepal
- Province: Province No. 3
- District: Bhaktapur

Population (2012)
  - Total: 16,918
  - Religions: Hindu
- Time zone: UTC+5:45 (Nepal Time)
- Postal code: 01
- Area code: 01

Jhaukhel (Nepali: झौखेल) is a town and former village development committee that is now part of Changunarayan Municipality in Bagmati Province of central Nepal. This is one of the oldest places in Bhaktapur. As of 2012, the population was 16,918. Most people in this area are engaged in agriculture. About 80% of the inhabitants are Newar people. The remaining 20% includes the population of Chettri, Brahmin, Magar, Tamang, and many more.
