= Changunarayan =

Changunarayan चाँगुनारायण
- Municipality (नगरपालिका)
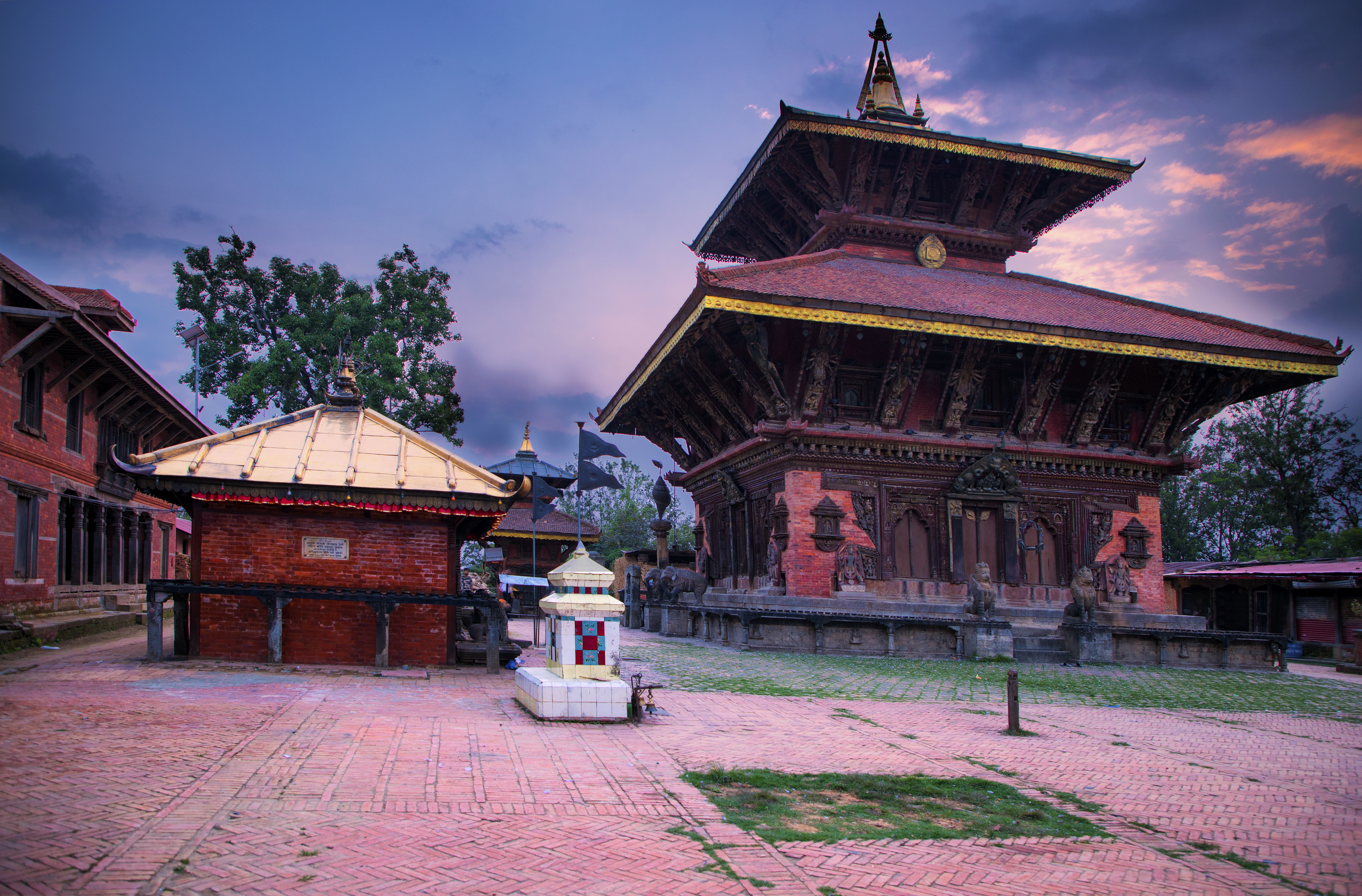
- Changunarayan Temple

- Location in Nepal Changunarayan (Nepal)
- Coordinates: 27°43′00″N 85°25′47″E
- Country: Nepal
- Province: Bagmati
- District: Bhaktapur
- Named for: Changu Narayan Temple

Government
  - Mayor: Mr. Jeeven Khatri
  - Deputy Mayor: Mr. Ramesh Budhathoki

Area
  - Total: 62.98 km^{2} (24.32 sq mi)

Population (2011)
  - Total: 55,430
  - Density: 880.1/km^{2} (2,280/sq mi)
  - Religions: Hindu
- Time zone: UTC+5:45 (NST)
- Website: changunarayanmun.gov.np

Changunarayan (Nepali: चाँगुनारायण) is a municipality in Bhaktapur District in the Bagmati Province of Nepal and is part of the urban agglomeration of the Kathmandu Valley. The municipality was created through the merger of the former Village development committees: Old-Changunarayan, Chhaling, Duwakot, and Jhaukhel in 2014. At the time of the 2011 Nepal census, the predecessors of Changunarayan Municipality had a population of 55,430. In 2017, the municipality of Mahamanjushree Nagarkot was merged into Changunarayan. The municipality is also home to the UNESCO World Heritage Site Changu Narayan temple.

== See also ==
- Changu Narayan
