= Chhaling =

Chhaling छालिङ
- Village of Changunarayan Municipality-Ward-5
- Location in Nepal
- Coordinates: 27°42′0″N 85°27′36″E
- Country: Nepal
- Province: Province No. 3
- District: Bhaktapur

Population (2011)
  - Total: 8,129
  - Religions: Hindu
- Time zone: UTC+5:45 (Nepal Time)

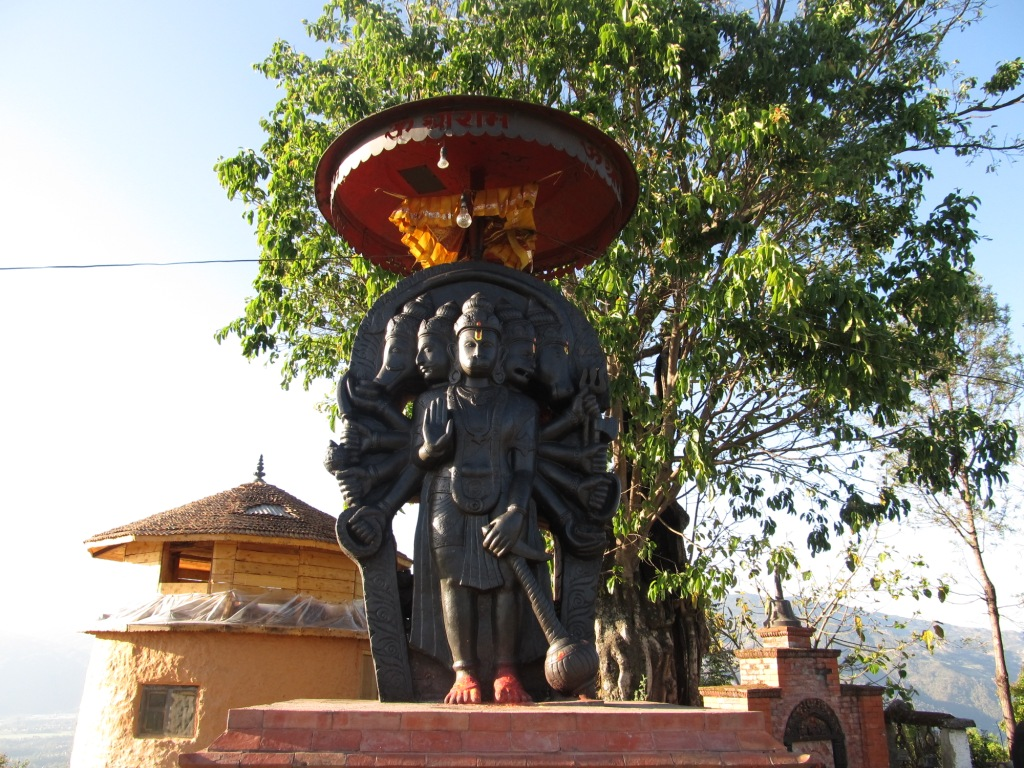
Temple of Trishuldada

Chhaling (Nepali: छालिङ) is a village and former Village Development Committee that is now part (Ward-5) of Changunarayan Municipality in Province No. 3 of central Nepal. At the time of the 2011 Nepal census it had a population of 8,129 with 1,817 houses in it. It is situated at about a distance of 20 kilometers from the capital city of Kathmandu.

The name "Chhaling" is believed to be derived from two words: "छाले गाउँ" ("Chhala"), meaning "skin", and "Gaun", meaning "village", as it was believed to be an area of animal skin and leather materials during the 18th century.

Most of the inhabitants are Brahmins and Chhetris, but there is also a large population of "Sanyasi" (meaning "saints" or "sages") and few Newars too. There is also a small population of Mongolians who live at the top of a hill in Chhaling.

During the ancient kirat and lichhavi dynasties, Chhaling was known as Gopal dranga under king Prathav Malla of Bishal Nagar. Chhaling has been a major route to one of the most popular tourist destinations near Kathmandu: Nagarkot. There are also a number of popular religious destinations, such as Panchamukhe Hanuman (also called Trisuldada), where the biggest copper trident in the world is believed to be located. Mahalaxmi Temple, Machhendranath and Manakamana Temple, and Panchamahalaxhmi Temple are also quite popular among the locals.
