= Changu Narayan Temple =

Hindu temple in Nepal

- 𑐔𑐵𑐒𑑂𑐐𑐸𑐣𑐵𑐬𑐵𑐫𑐞 𑐡𑐾𑐐𑑅 (Newar); चाँगुनारायण मन्दिर (Nepali)
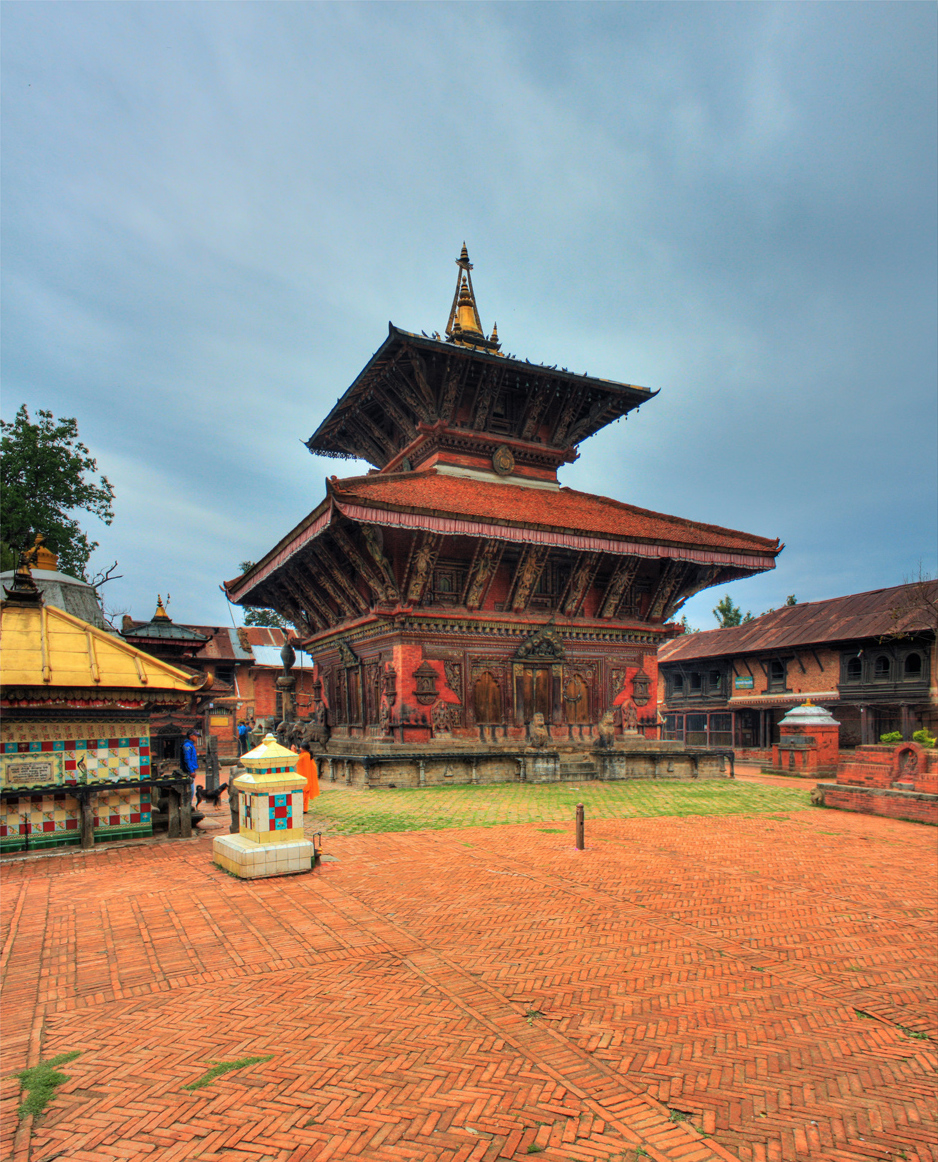

- location in Kathmandu

Religion
- Affiliation: Hinduism
- District: Bhaktapur
- Province: Bagmati
- Deity: Vishnu
- Festivals: Teej, Prabodhini Ekadashi, Naag Panchami

Location
- Location: Changunarayan
- Country: Nepal
- Coordinates: 27°42′58.6″N 85°25′40.4″E

Architecture
- Type: Pagoda
- Creator: Haridatta Barma

UNESCO World Heritage Site
- Criteria: Cultural: (iii)(iv)(vi)
- Designated: 1979 (3rd session)
- Part of: Kathmandu Valley
- Reference no.: 121bis-007

Protected Ancient Monument
- Law: Ancient Monuments Preservation Act, 2013 (1956)

Changu Narayan is a Hindu temple on a hilltop of Changu (also called Dolagiri) in Changunarayan Municipality of Bhaktapur District, Nepal. The temple was built in the 4th century AD and is one of the oldest Hindu temples in Nepal. It is dedicated to the Hindu deity Vishnu. The temple was made a World Heritage Site by UNESCO in 1979.

== Location ==
The temple is about 7 miles (12 km) east of Kathmandu, the capital of Nepal, and a few miles north of Bhaktapur. The Manohara River flows beside the hill.

== History ==
The temple was surrounded by champak tree forest and a small village known as Changu. A Kashmiri king is said to have given his daughter, Champak, in marriage to the prince of Bhaktapur. The temple is considered to be named after her.

=== Changu Narayan Pillar ===
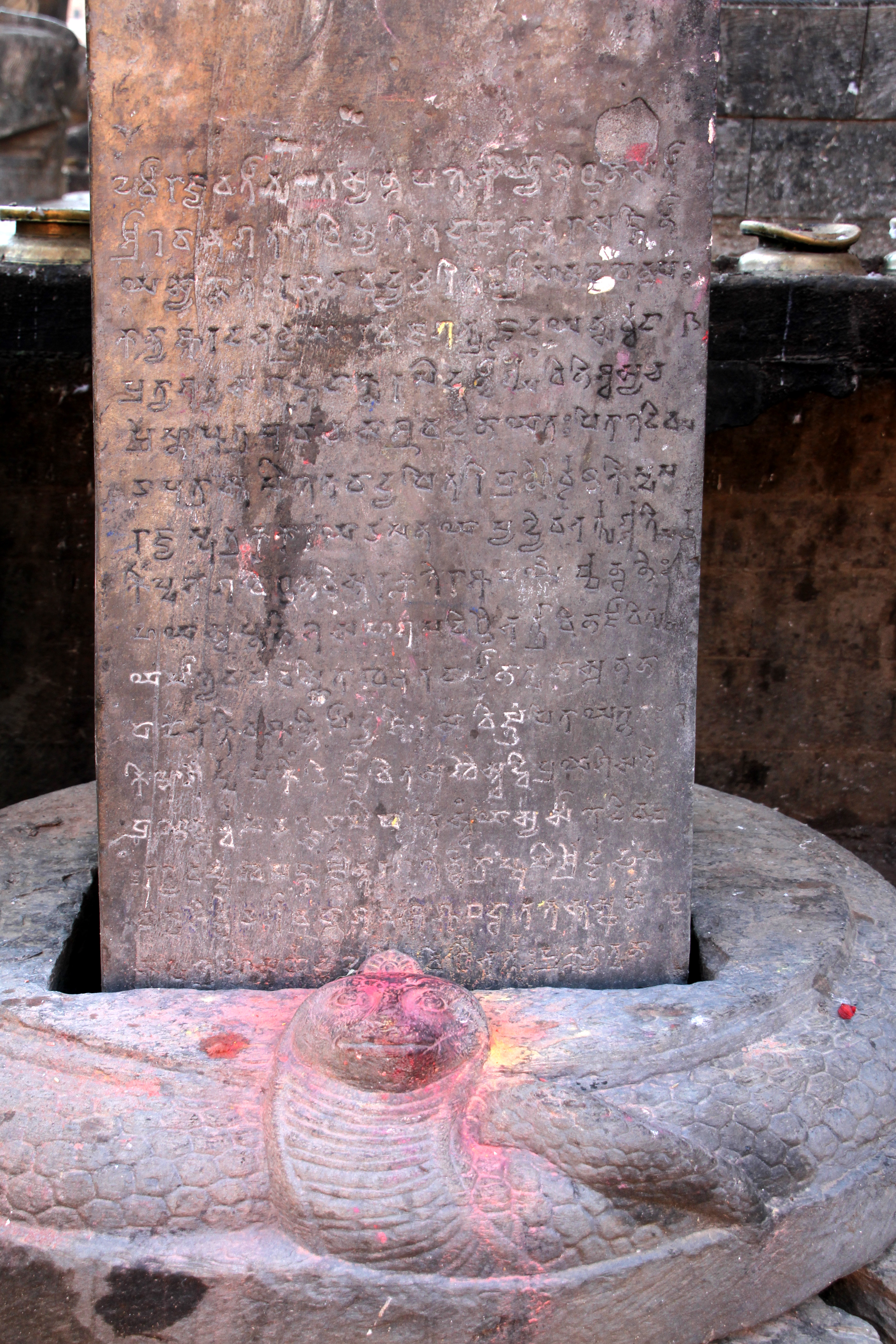
King Manadeva’s pillar inscription.

The temple houses one of the oldest pillar inscriptions in Nepal. It was made by a Lichhavi dynasty king Manadeva (r. 464 -505 AD). The inscription is written in Sanskrit. The pillar's complete inscription and inscriptions of other adjacent and nearby monuments were first transcribed and published in 1885 by Georg Buhler and Bhagawanla Indraji as "Twenty-three Inscriptions from Nepal".

Later in 1899, Sylvain Lévi was granted permission to conduct historical research in Nepal through the assistance of Bhim Shamshere, the Rana dynasty prime minister. This was done despite opposition from the temple priests, who refused to allow Lévi access to the temple compound. Although Lévi was unable to directly examine the pillar, he was provided with rubbings of the inscriptions, which he subsequently published along with the text and a corresponding translation in Le Népal. After Lévi's reading, there have been several subsequent transcriptions, including those by scholars such as Gnoli, Naraharinath, Vajracharya, Joshi, and Khanal.

== Structure ==
The Changu Narayan temple follows a traditional pagoda-style roof design with two levels, each with symmetrical pitched roofs. The roof structure is supported by small rafters arranged in a radial pattern from the center of the inner masonry cell. The dead load of the roof is transferred through rafters to the purlins and then to the wall plates, which originate from the core of the building. Inclined timber struts further help distribute the load from the purlins to the walls. Notably, the connections between the struts, purlins, and the main masonry walls are not rigid, allowing for some flexibility in the roof structure.

The foundation is designed with a wide plinth platform, functioning like a mat foundation, which helps to distribute the load and mitigate risks associated with soft soils, particularly during earthquakes. The plinth is about four feet high and provides a massive base for the structure, enhancing its stability. This design, coupled with stepped footings for the main wall, ensures that the temple is well-supported and resilient against seismic activity, which is crucial for its long-term durability in an earthquake-prone region.

The temple's masonry walls are constructed in a box configuration, featuring two cores. The outer core extends up to the second floor, providing structural integrity. These walls are built using a layered system: the inner face is made of sun-dried bricks, while the outer face is composed of fired clay bricks, which are smooth-finished for aesthetic and protective purposes. The mortar used in bonding the bricks is an essential element for the temple's strength and stability. While the mortar is often not visible, it plays a key role, and can consist of yellow clay, mud, or lime-surkhi mortar, depending on available materials.

== UNESCO Word heritage designation ==
The temple was recognized as a World Heritage Site by UNESCO in 1979 along with 6 other monument zones in the Kathmandu Valley, including Pashupatinath another temple complex, the urban centers of Kathmandu, Patan and Bhaktapur and the Buddhist sites Swayambunath and Bauddhanath.

== Idol theft ==
- In 1975 a statue of Krishna was stolen.
- In 1977 a statue of Kileswor Mahadev was stolen.
- In 1980 a statue of Surya was stolen.
- In 1981 the main statue of the temple was stolen.
- In September 2001, three idols were stolen from the temple, including that of Bhupalendra Malla. King Bhupalendra Malla had build two statues of himself and his wife Bhuvan Laxmi. The idols were erected 297 years ago in the main gate of the temple. The metal statue with the gold plate was 19 inches high and weighed 50 kg.

== Changu Museum ==
The Changu Museum showcases a collection of items such as a rhino-skin shield, a raincoat made from leaves, a 500-year-old dish rack, and rice that is over 225 years old. It also displays natural curiosities, including a cow's gallstone and the navel of a musk deer.

== Damage and renovation ==
- The 2015 earthquake destroyed the temple. A support from Chinese team was used to reconstruct the temple. The reconstruction was completed in five years. The destruction led UNESCO to consider adding the Kathmandu valley to the endangered heritage list.

== See also ==
- Sheshnarayan Temple
- List of Hindu temples in Nepal

== Gallery ==
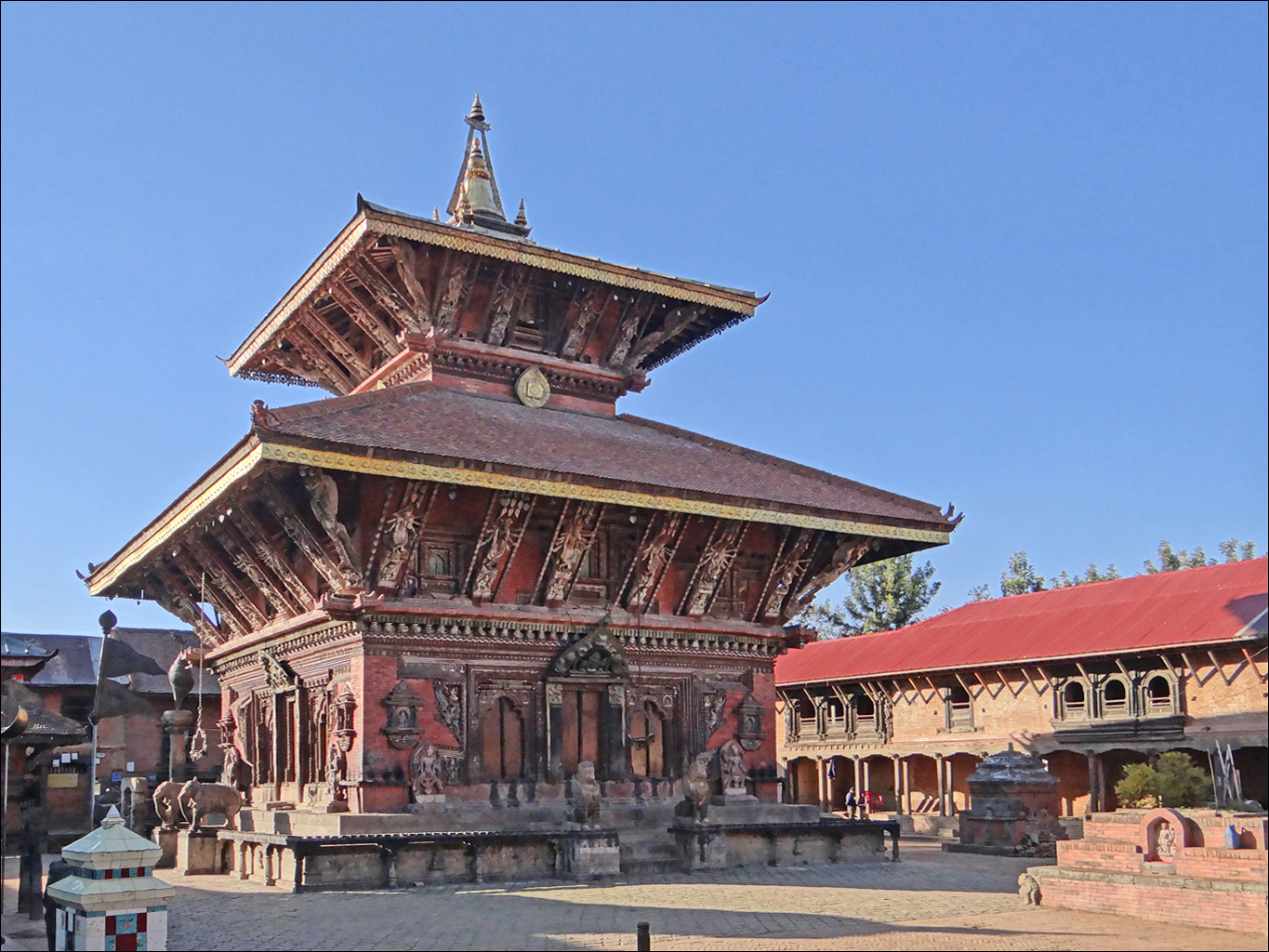

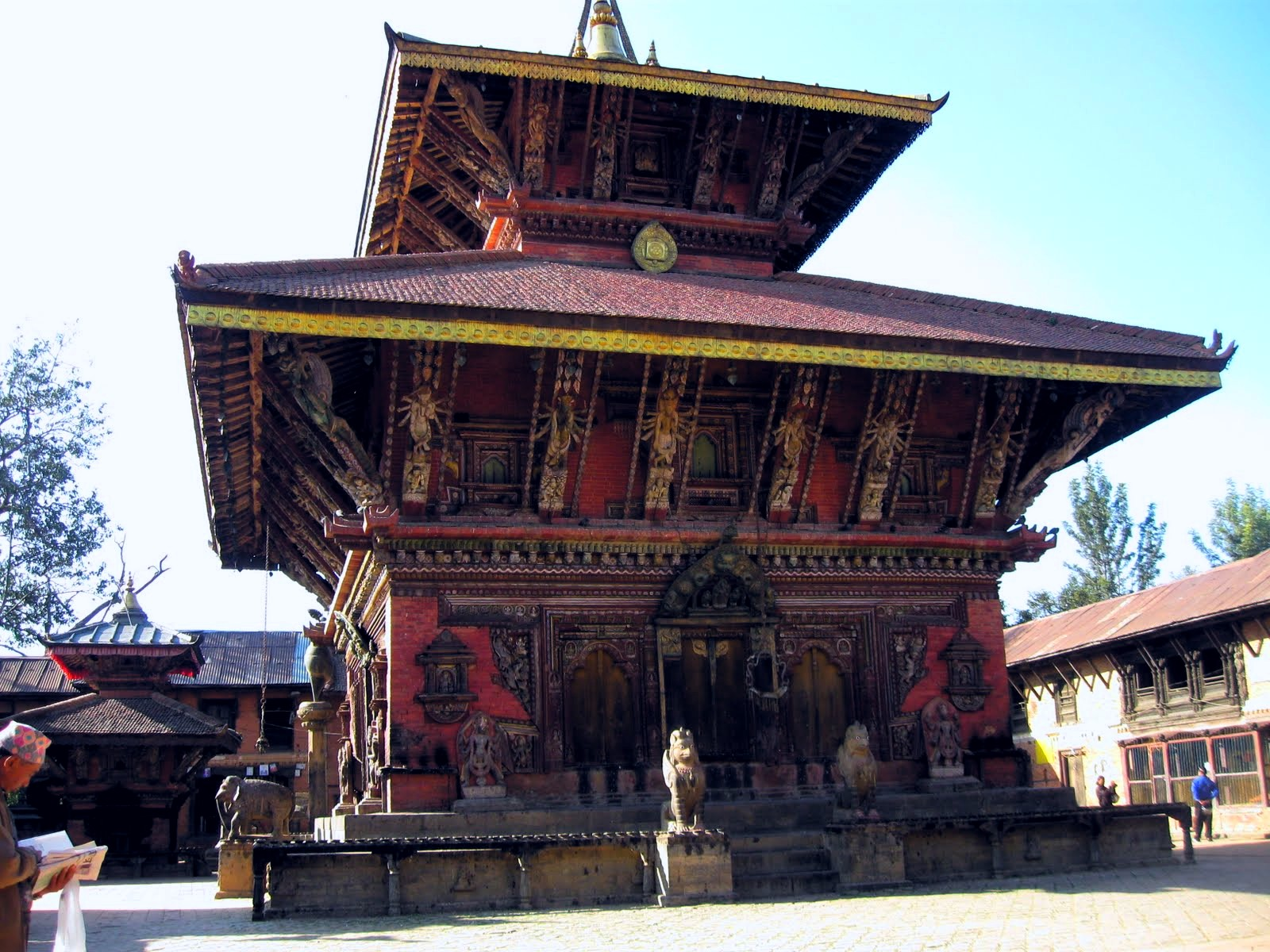

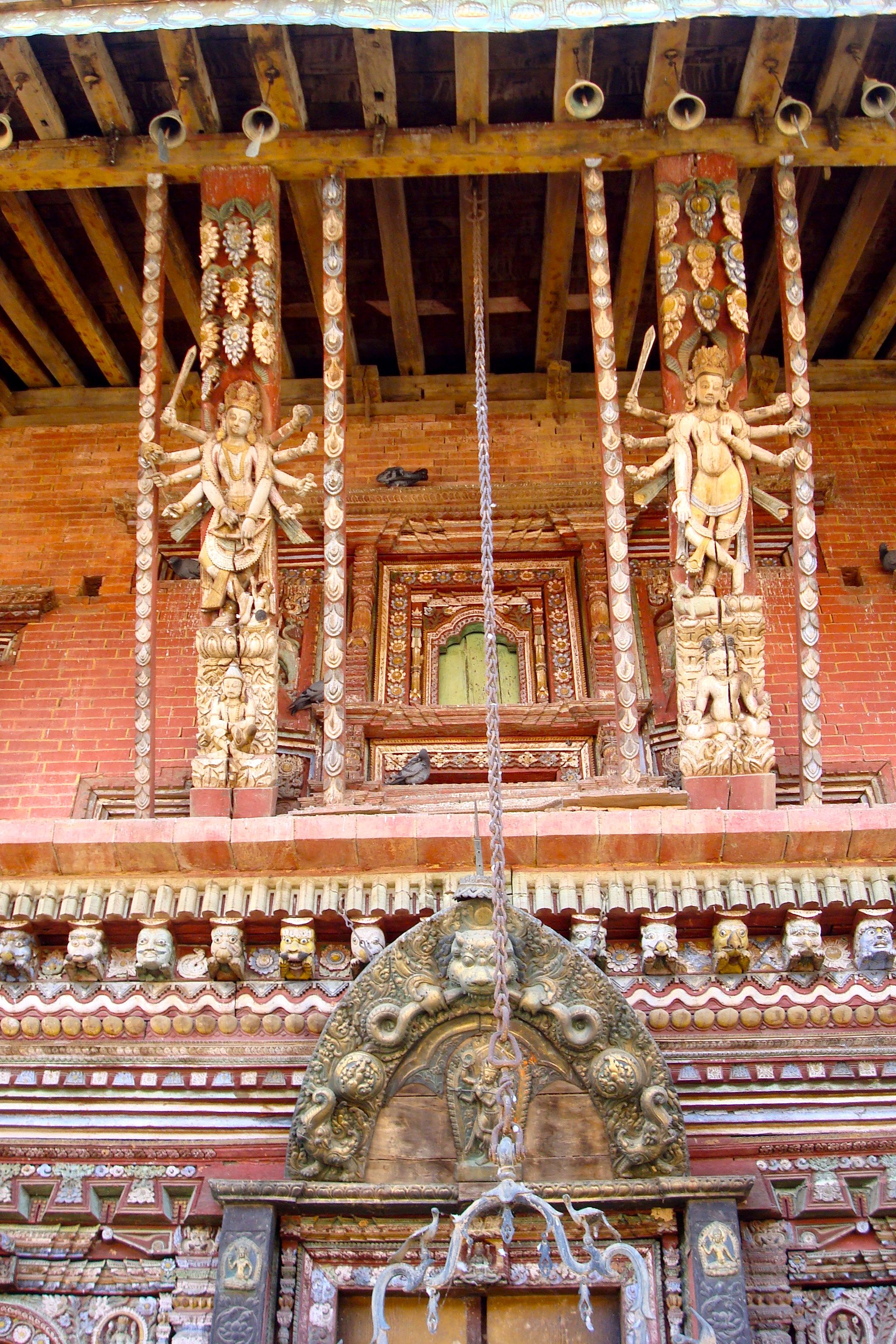

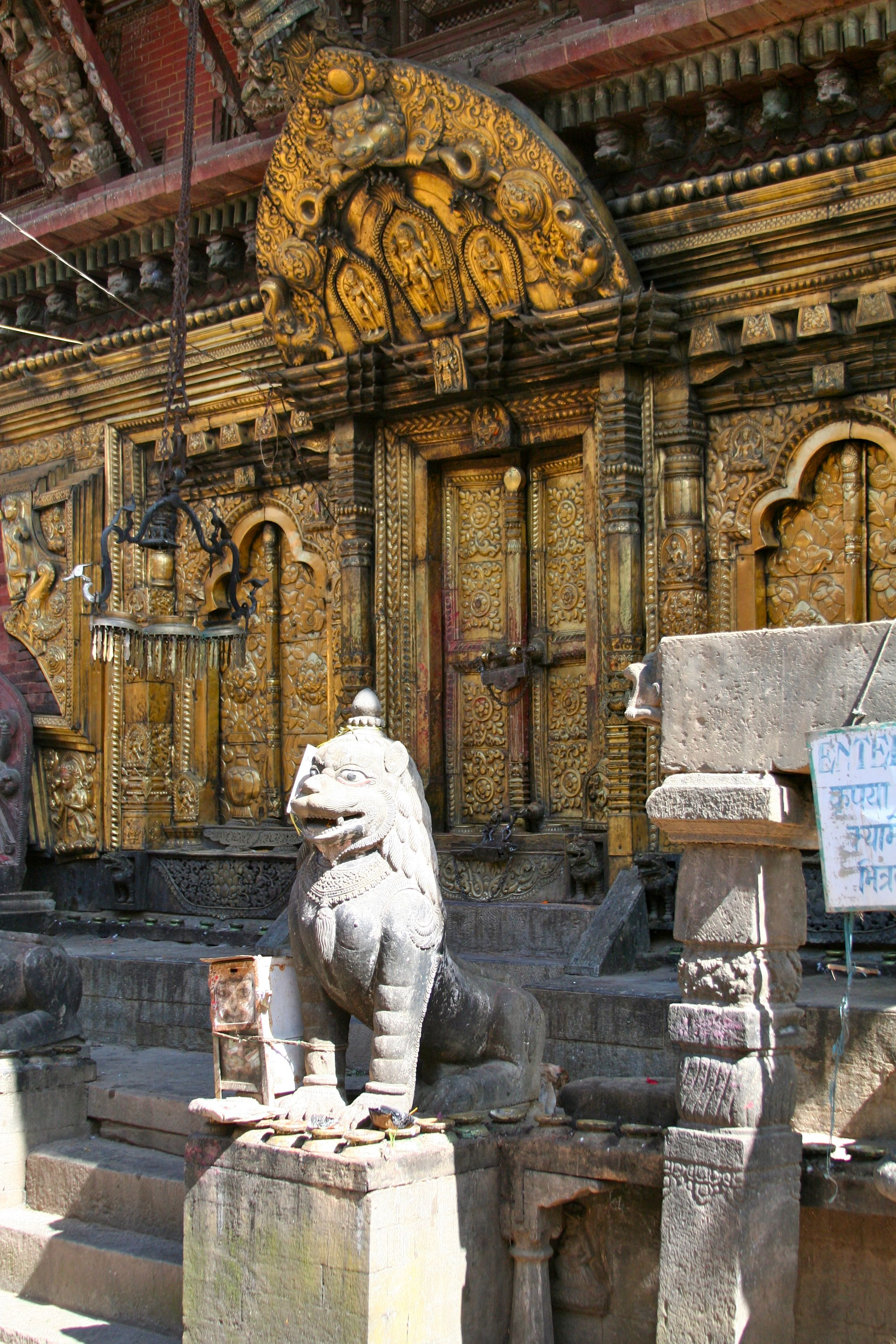

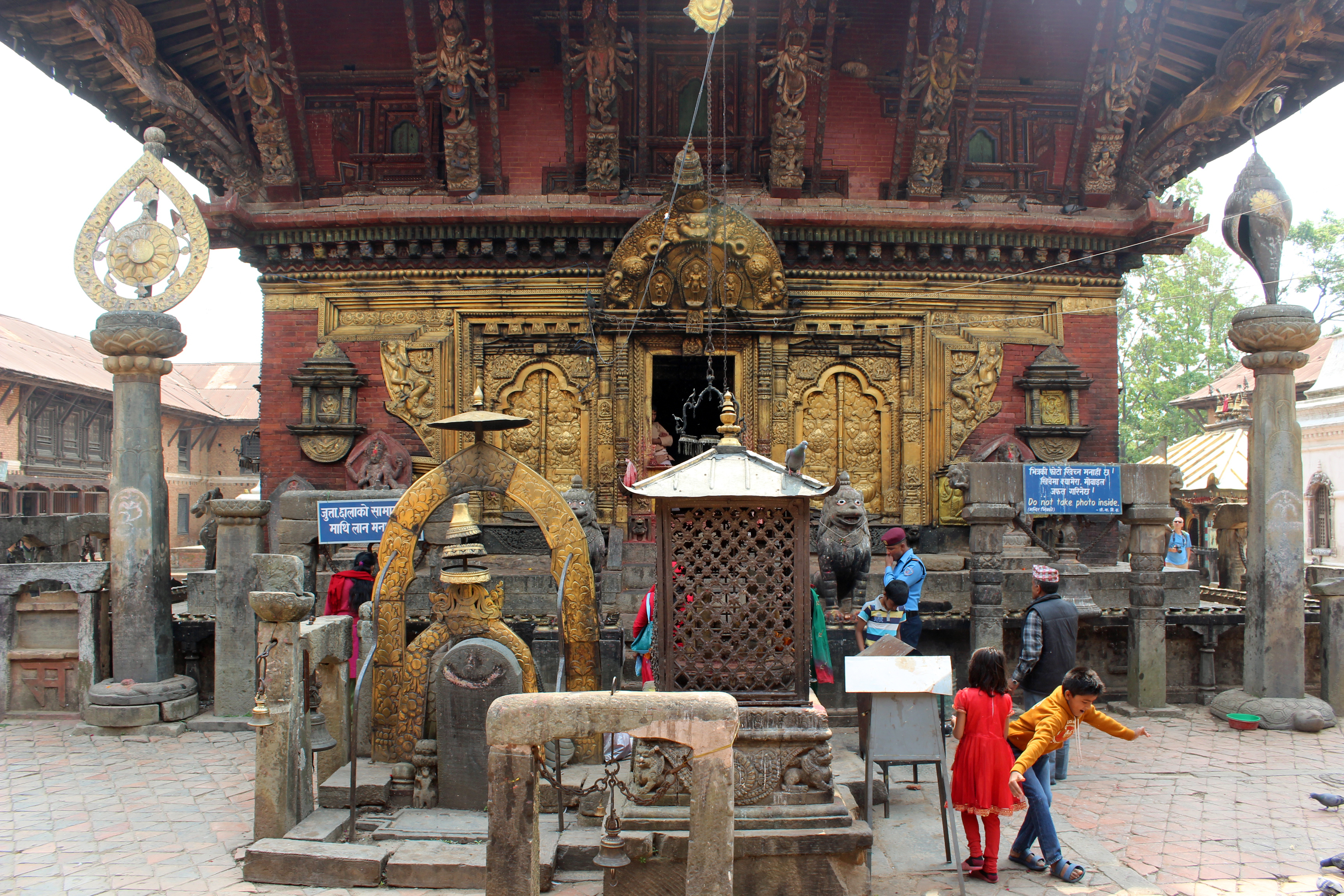

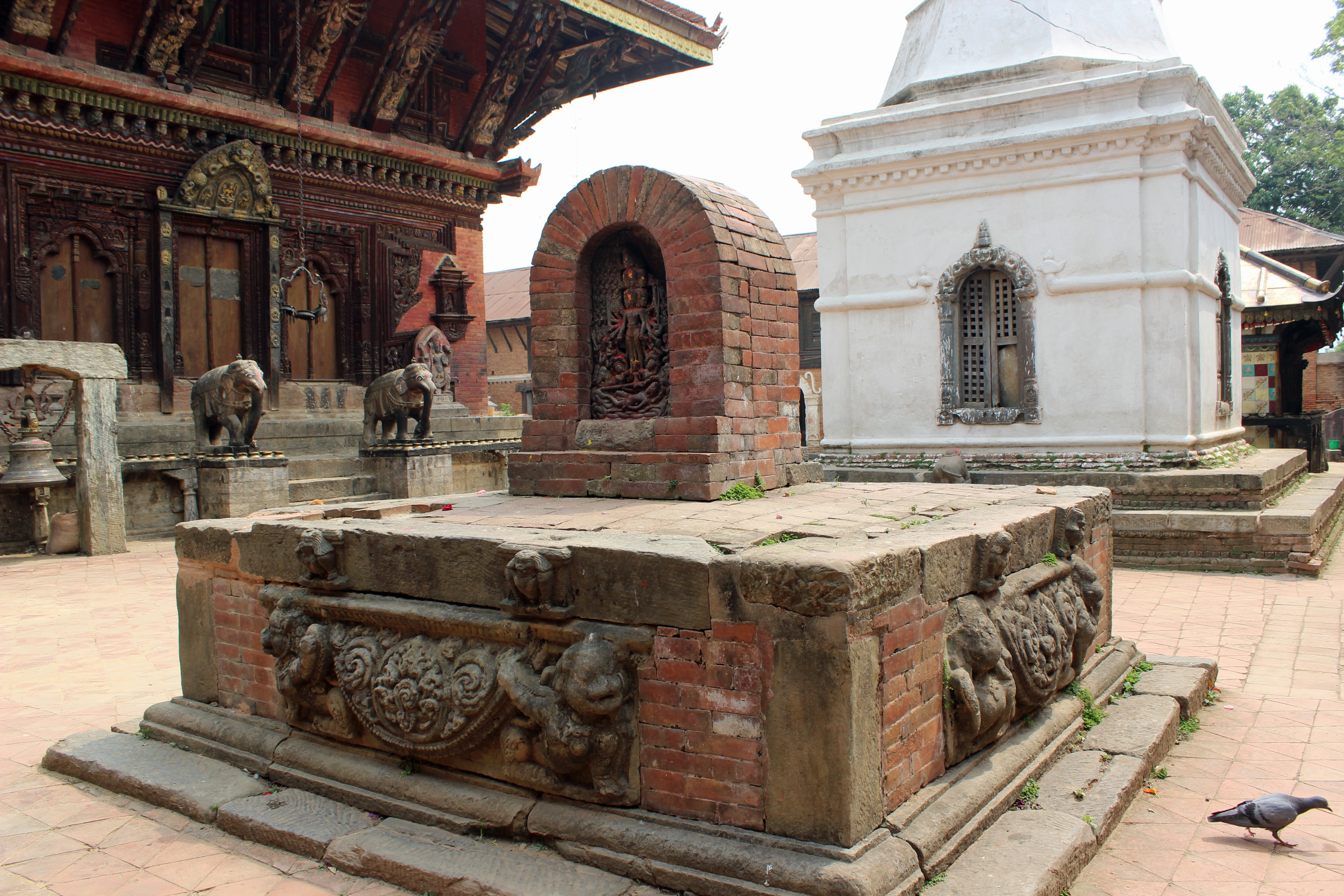

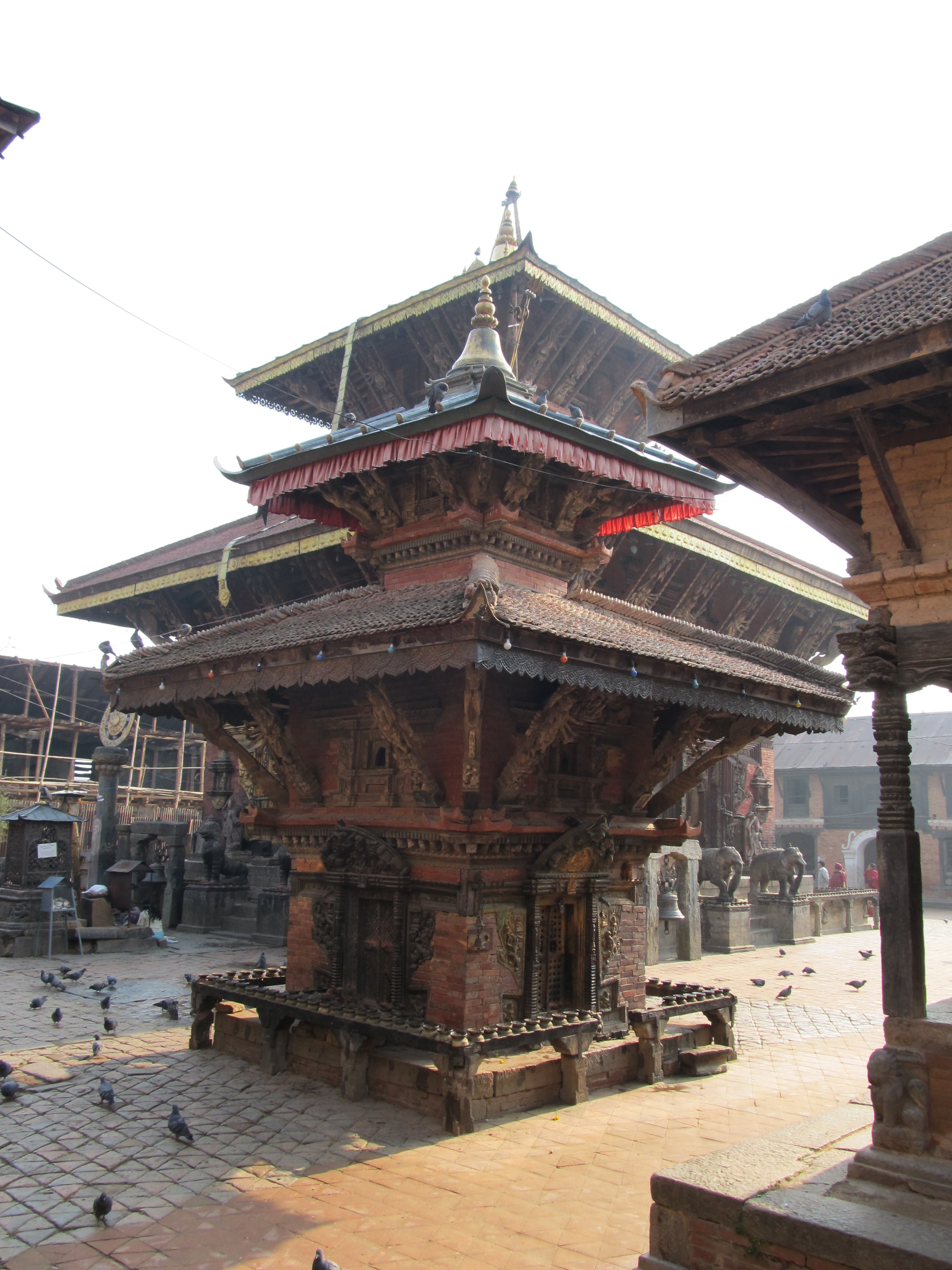

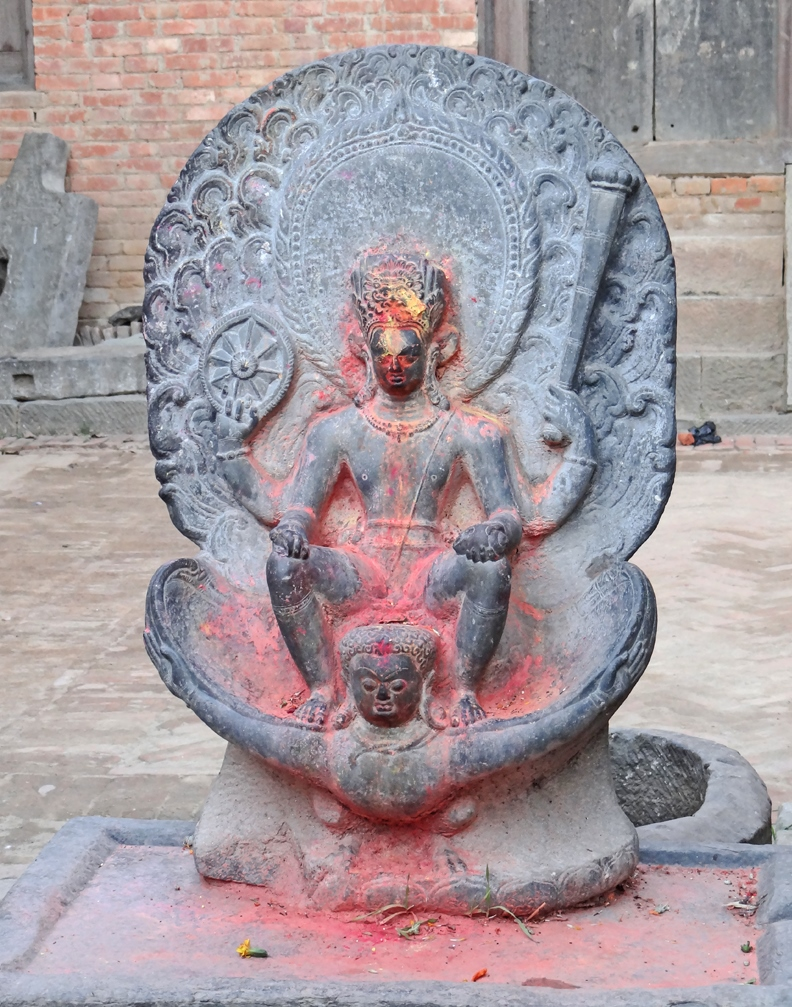

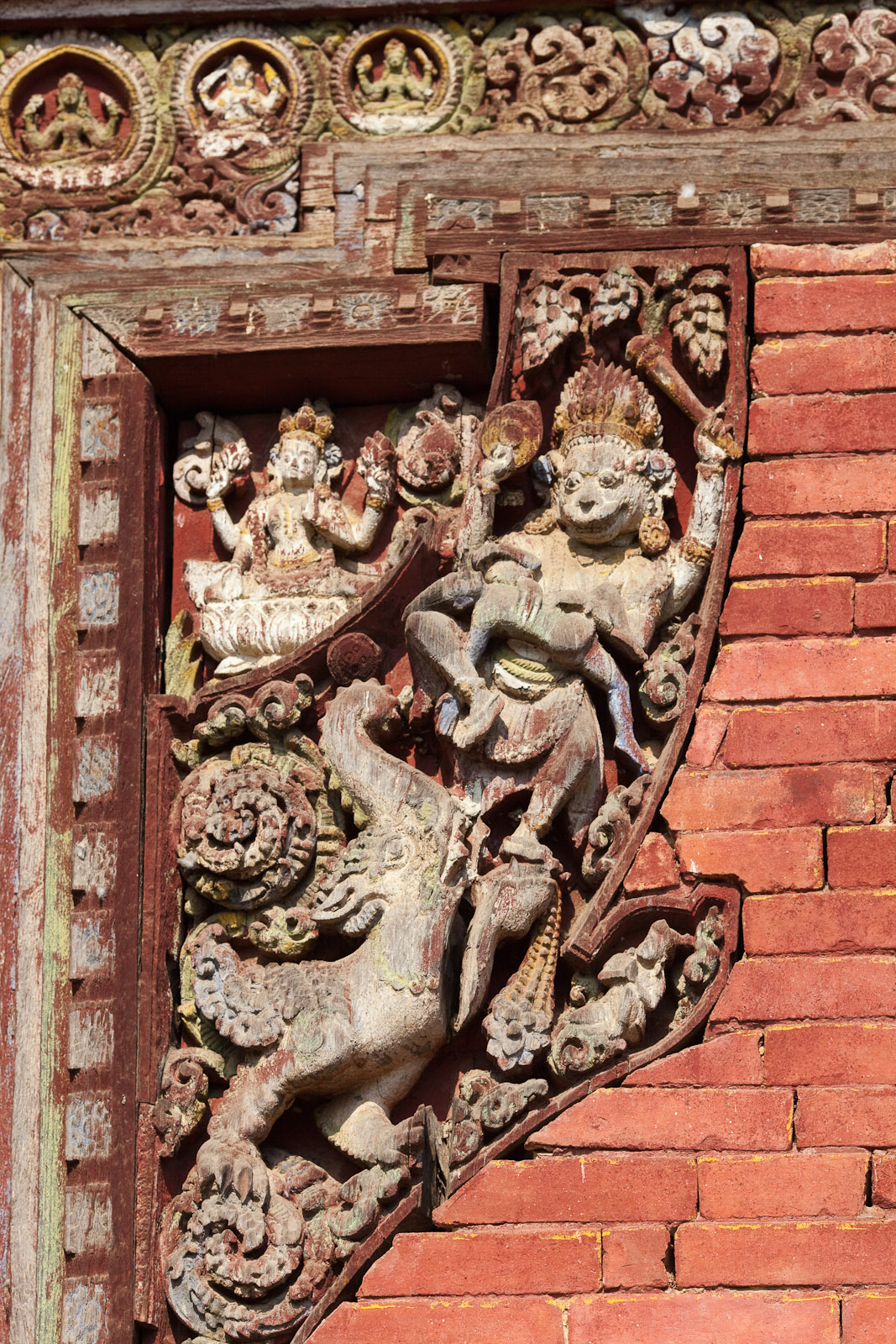

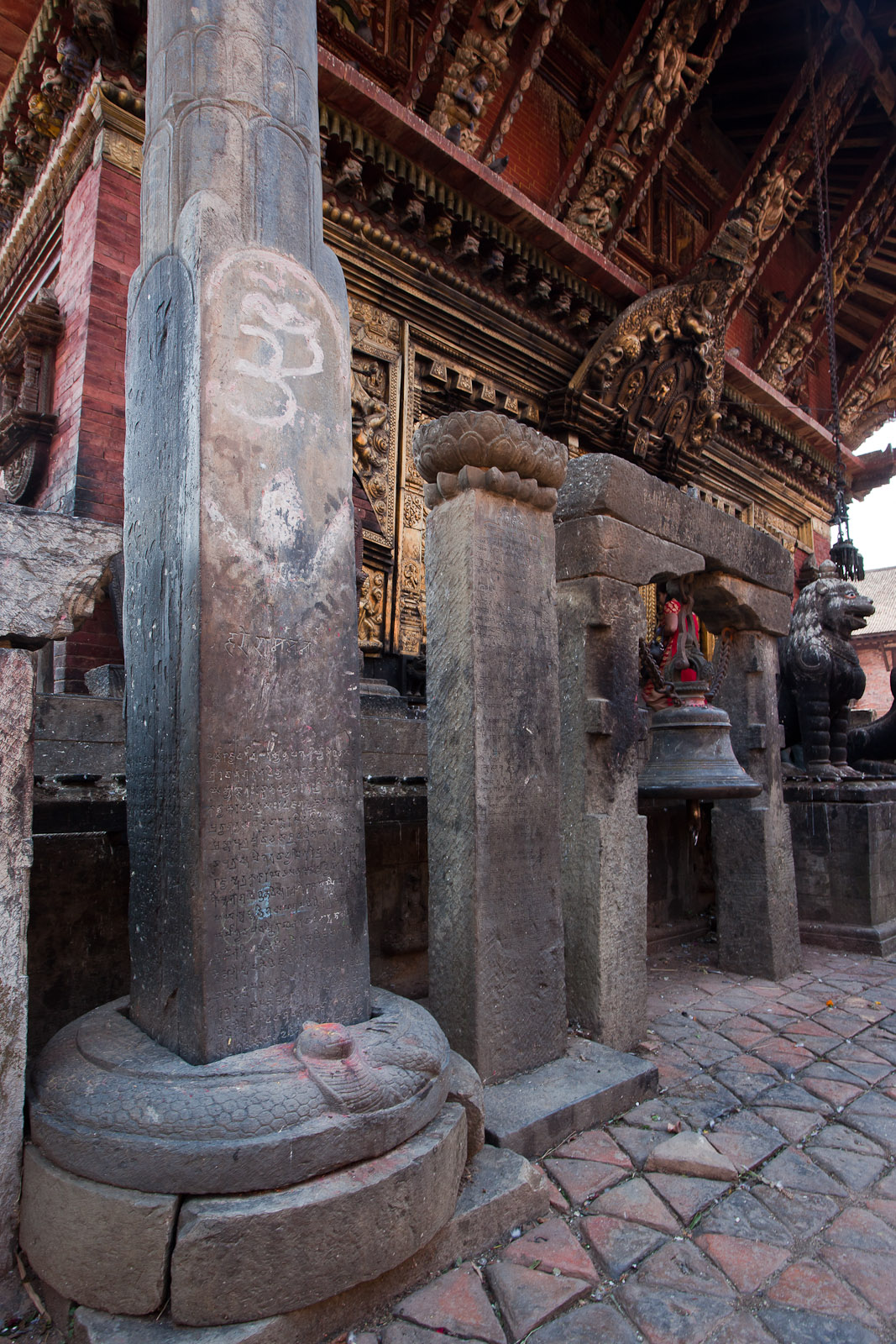
Manadeva's Pillar
