= Manadeva =

5th-century king of Nepal

Manadeva I
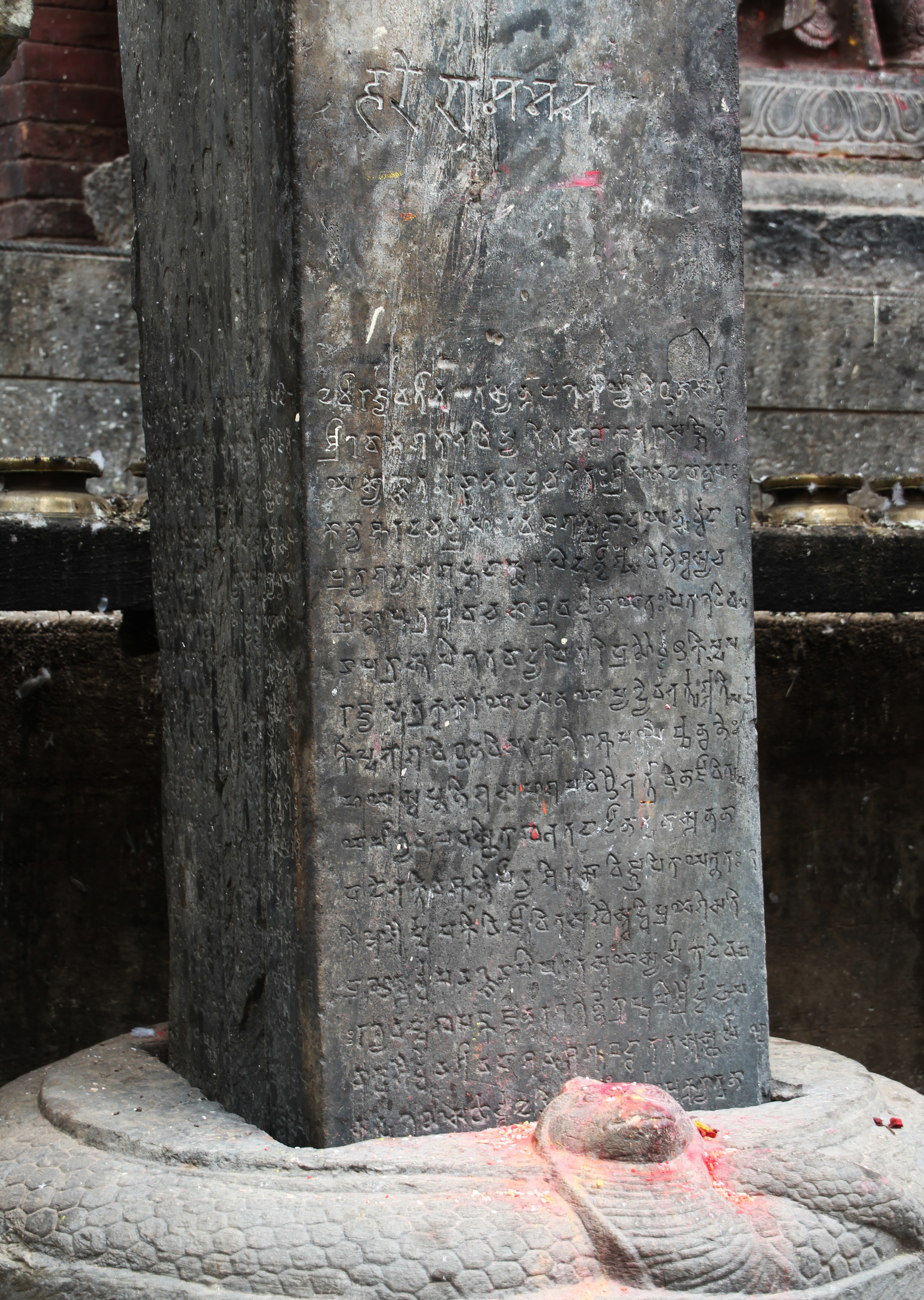
- Column with inscription in the Changu Narayan Temple

King of Nepal
- Reign: 464–505
- Predecessor: Dharmadeva
- Successor: Mahideva
- Spouse: Bhogini; Ksemasundari; Gunavati
- Issue: Mahideva
- Dynasty: Lichchhavi
- Father: Dharmadeva
- Mother: Rajyabati
- Religion: Hinduism

King Mānadeva (464–505 AD), also spelled as Mandev or Mandeva (Nepali: मानदेव), was a king of Licchavi dynasty in Nepal. He was the son of Dharmadeva, grandson of Shankardeva and the great grandson of Vrsadeva. He suppressed the feudal chiefs of the east and west and also conquered Mallapuri. He minted coins called Mananka and constructed the palace of Managriha for himself which later became a center of administration of the Licchavi kings.

== Reign ==
Mandev's father died when he was young and he was crowned as the king in his early age. His mother Rajyabati, upon her husband's death, chose to assist her son in ruling the kingdom rather than going Sati. After he ascended the throne, the Thakuri governors of the eastern provinces tried to revolt with the aim of gaining independence from the Licchavi rule. Manadev marched with a huge army and suppressed the rebellion forcefully.

After crushing the rebels, he, along with his maternal uncle, marched towards west and conquered Mallapuri, Nabalpur and various other tiny states. He expanded his kingdoms up to the Himalayas in the north, to the other side of Gandaki River in the west, and to the Kosi River in the east.

He installed 14 inscriptions during his reign. His inscription in the Changu Narayan Temple is dated 464 C.E making it the earliest inscription from not only the Licchavi period but from the ancient period of Nepal.

He ruled for more than 41 years without any challenge to his authority was succeeded by his son, Mahideva.

== Personal life ==
He had at least three queens: Bhogini, Ksemasundari, and Gunavati. Although he was an ardent worshipper of Vishnu, he was tolerant of other religions as shown by the installation of Shiva's images by his queens and his daughter.

Preceded by Dharmadeva	King of Nepal; 464–505	Succeeded by Mahideva
