= Shivadeva I =

6th-century King of Nepal

King of Nepal
- Reign: 590–605
- Predecessor: Dharmadeva
- Deposed by: Amshuvarma
- Issue: Udaydeva; Dhruvadeva
- Dynasty: Lichchhavi Dynasty
- Father: Manadeva II
- Religion: Hinduism

Shivadeva I (also spelled Sivadeva) was a king of the Licchavi dynasty who ruled Nepal from around 590 to 605 C.E. He was the son of Mana Deva II and lived in a nine-storeyed palace called the Kailashkut Bhavan.

== Political life ==
In 598 C.E, a feudal lord, Amshuverma, who belonged to the Vaisya clan, rose to a position of an influential officer and assumed the title of Maharajadhiraj reducing Shivadeva to a mere figurehead. Rather than resisting Amshuverma's rise, he married his daughter to him. Upon his death, his son-in-law Amshuverma succeeded him as the king.

Preceded by Dharmadeva	King of Nepal; 590–605	Succeeded by Amshuverma
