= Arunasva =

King of Kannauj from 647 to 649

King of Kannauj
- Reign: 647 – 16 June 649
- Predecessor: Harshavardhana
- Successor: Yashovarman

Arunāsva (also known as Aluonashun in Chinese sources and as Arjuna) was the governor of Tirabhukti (modern north Bihar) who later usurped the throne of Kannauj. He had been the governor of Tirhut and a minister at the court of Harsha and usurped the throne after his death, succeeding the Pushyabhuti dynasty. He is known for repulsing an invasion launched by the Arab Muslims of the Rashidun Caliphate.

== Reign ==
The historian, Yogendra Mishra, was of the view that Arunasva was likely a prince related to the Maukhari dynasty who had established a base of operations for himself in the region of Tirhut where he served as a governor for Harshavardhana.

After emperor Harshavardhana's death, he usurped the throne and became the new king of Kannauj including his former possessions in Tirabhukti. He was the emperor's former minister. In 648, the Tang dynasty's emperor Tang Taizong sent Wang Xuance to India in response to emperor Harsha having sent an ambassador to China. However once in India he discovered Harsha had died and the new king Aluonashun (supposedly Arunāsva) attacked Wang and his 30 mounted subordinates. This led to Wang Xuance escaping to Tibet and then mounting a joint of over 7,000 Nepalese mounted infantry and 1,200 Tibetan infantry and attack on the Indian state on 16 June at the Battle of Chabuheluo.

The success of this attack won Xuance the title of the "Grand Master for the Closing Court." (Note that this is not a prestigious title, only in the 5th rank of Tang's nine-rank official system) He also secured a reported Buddhist relic for China. 2,000 prisoners were taken from Magadha by the Nepali and Tibetan forces under Wang. Tibetan and Han language writings document describe Wang Xuance's raid on India with Tibetan soldiers. Nepal had been subdued by the Tibetan king Songtsen. The Indian pretender was among the captives. The war happened in 649. Taizong's grave had a statue of the Indian pretender. The pretender's name was recorded in Chinese records as "Na-fu-ti O-lo-na-shuen" (Dinafudi is probably a reference to Tirabhukti).
