= Wang Xuance =

Chinese diplomat and general

Wang Xuance (Chinese: 王玄策; pinyin: Wáng Xuáncè, fl. 7th century) was a Chinese diplomat, military general, and travel writer.

== Background ==
In 643 CE he went on a pilgrimage to India, together with Li Yibiao. Due to Tibet's aggressive stance, which threatened both Chinese and Indian states, (Note: Nepal had been subdued by the Tibetan King Songtsen (Sen 2003, pp. 22).) The Tang and Kannauj had started to maintain friendly relations, and in 648, Tang Taizong (reign 626 to 649) of the Tang dynasty (618 to 907) sent him to the Kingdom of Kannauj (510–1036), India, heading the third Tang mission, in response to Harshavardhana (reign 606 to 647) sending an ambassador to China. According to Chinese sources, (Note: The confrontation is only described in Tibetan and Chinese sources, not in Indian sources, and may have been exaggerated by the Chinese.(Sen 2003, pp. 22–24, 253).) on arriving in India he discovered that Harshavardhana had died. The new king, Aluonashun (supposedly Arunāsva (Note: The pretender's name was recorded in Chinese records as "Na-fu-ti O-lo-na-shuen," probably a reference to Tirabhukti and Arunasva.)), attacked Wang and his 30 mounted subordinates. Wang Xuance escaped to Tibet, and assembled a regiment of 7,000 Nepalese mounted infantry and 1,200 Tibetan mercenaries, which attacked Arunāsva at the Battle of Chabuheluo, captivating him and 2,000 prisoners, and also taking a reported Buddhist relic for China. The success of this attack won Xuance the prestigious title of the "Grand Master for the Closing Court." He wrote the book Zhong Tianzhu Guo Xingji (Travel Notes of Central India), which included a wealth of geographical information.

== Sources ==
Printed sources

- Bagchi, Prabodh Chandra (2011). India and China: interactions through Buddhism and diplomacy; a collection of essays. Anthem Press. ISBN 978-93-80601-17-5.
- Benn, Charles D. (2002). Daily Life in Traditional China: The Tang Dynasty. Greenwood Publishing Group. ISBN 978-0-313-30955-7.
- Bennett, Matthew; Connoll, Peter (1998). The Hutchinson Dictionary of Ancient & Medieval Warfare. Taylor & Francis.
- Chen, Jinhua (2002). "Śarīra and Scepter. Empress Wu's Political Use of Buddhist Relics". Journal of the International Association of Buddhist Studies. 25 (1–2).
- Needham, Joseph (1959). Science and Civilisation in China: Volume 3; Mathematics and the Sciences of the Heavens and the Earth. Cambridge University Press. ISBN 0-521-05801-5.
- Pordenone, Odorico, da; Tabib, Rashīd al-Dīn; Balducci Pegolotti, Francesco; Marignolis, Joannes, de; Batuta, Ibn (1998). Cathay and the Way Thither: Preliminary essay on the intercourse between China and the western nations previous to the discovery of the Cape route. Munshiram Manoharlal Publishers Pvt. Ltd. ISBN 9788121508391.
- Schaik, Sam, Van (2011). Tibet: A History. Yale University Press. ISBN 978-0-300-17217-1.
- Sen, Tansen (2003). Buddhism, Diplomacy, and Trade: The Realignment of Sino-Indian Relations, 600-1400. University of Hawaii Press. ISBN 978-0-8248-2593-5.
- Sircar, D.C. (1990). Studies in the Geography of Ancient and Medieval India. Motilal Banarsidass. ISBN 978-81-208-0690-0.
- Yule, Henry (1915). Cathay and the Way Thither, Being a Collection of Medieval Notices of China. Asian Educational Services. ISBN 978-81-206-1966-1.
