= Kailashkut Bhawan =

Former palace in Nepal

Kailashkut Bhawan was a palace in Nepal, built by Lichhavi King Amshuverma immediately after he was crowned in 598 CE. It was constructed in vedic tripura style, having three adjoining buildings, Indragriha, Managriha and Kailashkut, and three courtyards.

After Amshuverma, other de facto-ruler like Jishnugupta and Vishnugupta also ruled from Kailashkut Bhawan. While nominal head of the state used to stay at Mangriha palace.

The Chinese monk Xuanzang mentioned the Kailashkut Bhawan in his travelogue and noted that the upper floor lobby could hold 10,000 people.

Some remains of the palace may be located in Handigaun, Kathmandu District.
