= Licchavis of Nepal =

Early-medieval kingdom of the Kathmandu Valley, Nepal

- c. 400 CE–c. 879 CE
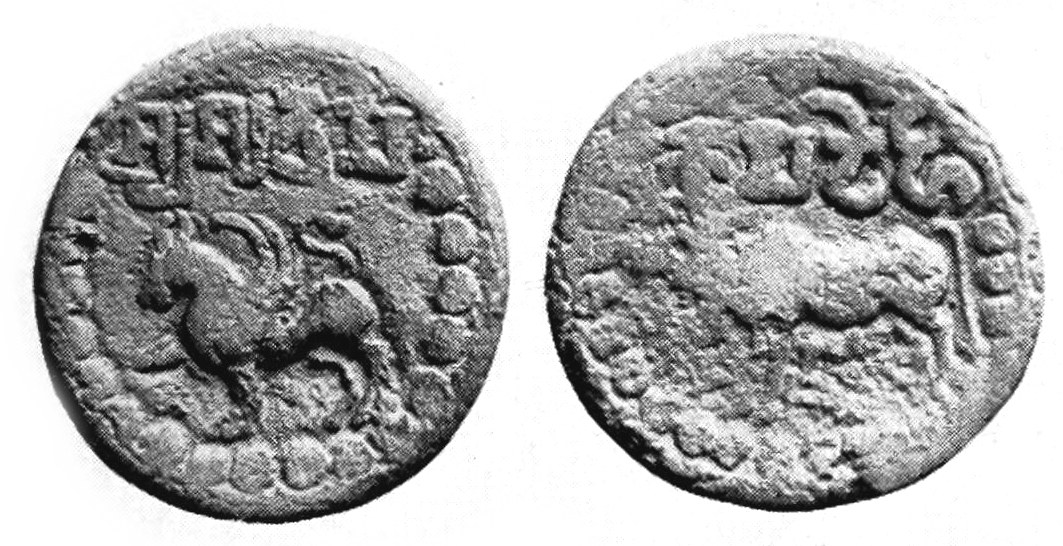
- Coinage of Licchavi king Amshuverma (605–621 CE). Obverse: winged lion, with Brahmi legend Śri Amśurvarma "Lord Amshurvarma". Reverse: Bull with Brahmi legend Kāmadēhi ("Incarnation of Kāma").

- Fragmented South Asian polities circa 600 CE, after the retreat of the Alchon Huns.
- Common languages: Sanskrit; Proto-Newar
- Government: Monarchy
- History
  - Established: c. 400 CE
  - Disestablished: c. 879 CE
Preceded by	Succeeded by
Soma dynasty	Thakuri dynasty; Katyuri kings
- Today part of: Nepal

The Licchavis of Nepal (Sanskrit: लिच्छवि, also Lichchhavi, Lichavi) ruled over a kingdom in the Kathmandu Valley of Nepal from approximately 400 to 879 CE. The Licchavi clan originated from a branch of the Licchavis of Vaishali, who ruled in the territory of modern-day Bihar and who later conquered the Kathmandu Valley. The Licchavis were ruled by a maharaja, aided by a prime minister and other royal officials, but in practice local communities were controlled by caste councils.

The ruling period of this dynasty was called the Golden Period of Nepal. A table of the evolution of certain Gupta characters used in Licchavi inscriptions prepared by Gautamavajra Vajrācārya can be found online.

== Records ==
It is believed that a branch of the Licchavi clan, having lost their political fortune and military power in Vaishali (Bihar), came to Kathmandu and intermarried with the family of the ruling Queen, Mandeva Shree Vogini of the Nagvanshi clan, thus beginning their rule in Nepal. They also battled with local militias in Chyasal to gain control of Nepal.

The earliest known physical record of the kingdom is an inscription of Mānadeva, which dates from 464. It mentions three preceding rulers, suggesting that the Licchavi dynasty began in the late 4th century.

== Government ==
The Licchavis were ruled by a Maharaja ("great king"), who was aided by a prime minister, in charge of the military and of other ministers. Nobles, known as samanta influenced the court whilst simultaneously managing their own landholdings and militia. At one point, between approximately 605 and 641, a prime minister called Amshuverma assumed the throne.

The population provided land taxes and conscript labour (vishti) to support the government. Most local administration was performed by village heads or leading families. Many kings ruled but the popular ones were Manadeva, Amshuverma etc.

== Culture ==
=== Language ===
During the Licchavi dynasty, Sanskrit was the court language, while Newar language was the vernacular language. The Licchavi inscriptions are 190 in total, and are carved in Sanskrit. Among those inscriptions, 53 were written in Gupta script, while 137 were written in Kutila script. Although these inscriptions were written in Sanskrit, they contain frequent Newari derivative words.

== Economy ==
The economy was agricultural, relying on rice and other grains as staples. Villages (grama) were grouped into dranga for administration. Lands were owned by the royal family and nobles. Trade was also very important, with many trading settlements.

== Geography ==
=== Domain ===
Settlements already filled the entire valley during the Licchavi period. Further settlement extended east toward Banepa, west toward Tistung Deurali, and northwest toward present-day Gorkha.

== Rulers ==
The following list was adapted from The Licchavi Kings, by Tamot & Alsop, and is approximate only, especially with respect to dates.

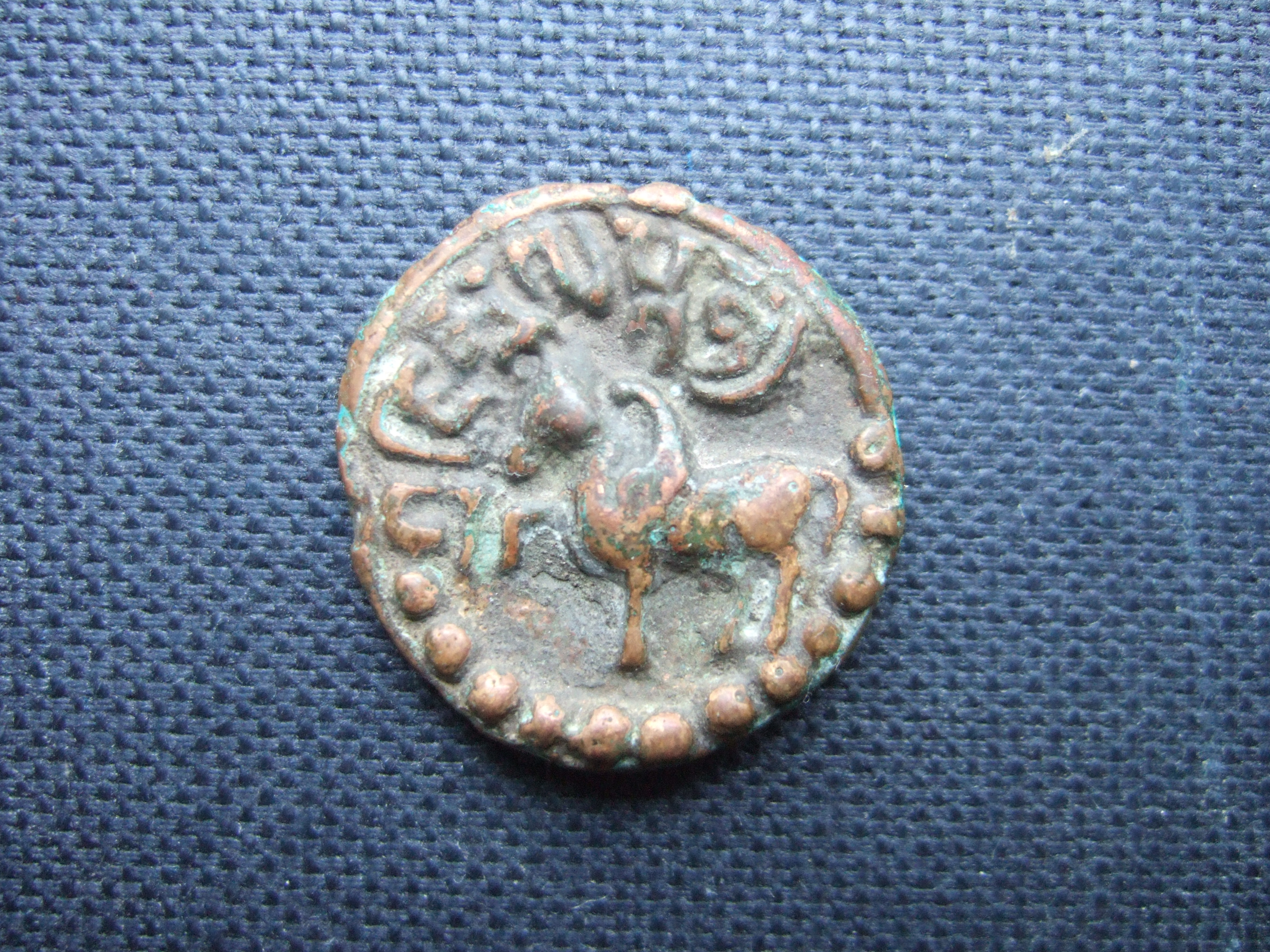
Copper coin of Jishnu Gupta (c. 622–633) of the Nepalese Licchavi Dynasty. Obverse. The inscription above the winged horse is Sri Jishnu Guptasya

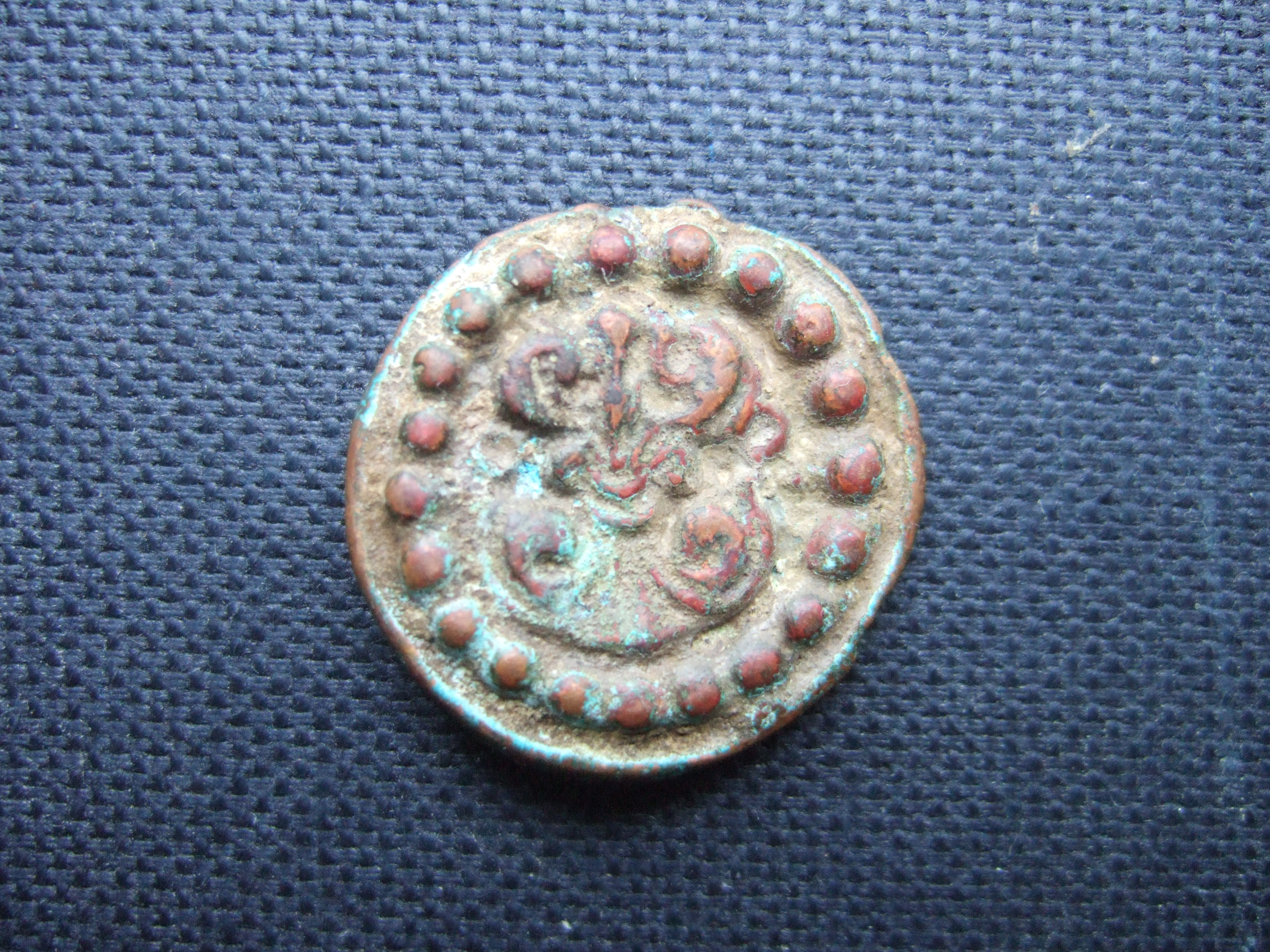
Copper coin of Jishnu Gupta (c. 622–633) of the Nepalese Licchavi Dynasty. Reverse

- 185 Jayavarmā (also Jayadeva I)
- Vasurāja (also Vasudatta Varmā)
- c. 400 Vrsadeva (also Vishvadeva)
- c. 425 Shaṅkaradeva I
- c. 450 Dharmadeva
- 464-505 Mānadeva I
- 505-506 Mahīdeva (few sources)
- 506-532 Vasantadeva
- Manudeva (probable chronology)
- 538 Vāmanadeva (also Vardhamānadeva)
- 545 Rāmadeva
- Amaradeva
- Gunakāmadeva
- 560-565 Ganadeva
- 567-c. 590 Bhaumagupta (also Bhūmigupta, probably not a king)
- 567-573 Gaṅgādeva
- 575/576 Mānadeva II (few sources)
- 590-604 Shivadeva I
- 605-621 Amshuvarma
- 621 Udayadeva
- 624-625 Dhruvadeva
- 631-633 Bhīmārjunadeva, Jisnugupta
- 635 Visnugupta - Jisnugupta
- 640-641 Bhīmārjunadeva / Visnugupta
- 643-679 Narendradeva
- 694-705 Shivadeva II
- 713-733 Jayadeva II
- 748-749 Shaṅkaradeva II
- 756 Mānadeva III
- 826 Balirāja
- 847 Baladeva
- 875–879 Mandeva IV

== See also ==
- History of Nepal
- Nepal
- Mahajanapadas
- Vaishali (ancient city)

== Sources ==
- Ashvini Agrawal (1989). Rise and Fall of the Imperial Guptas. Motilal Banarsidass. ISBN 978-81-208-0592-7.
- R. C. Majumdar (1981). A Comprehensive History of India. Vol. 3, Part I: A.D. 300-985. Indian History Congress / People's Publishing House. OCLC 34008529.
