= St. Xavier's College, Kolkata =

Private university and college in Kolkata, India

Coordinates: 22.54837°N 88.35596°E

- Coat of arms
- Motto: Nihil Ultra (Latin)
- Motto in English: Nothing Beyond
- Type: Private
- Established: 16 January 1860; 166 years ago
- Founder: Society of Jesus
- Religious affiliation: Roman Catholic (Jesuit)
- Academic affiliations: University of Calcutta
- Rector: Rev. Fr. (Dr.) Sacaria Joseph, SJ
- Principal: Rev. Fr. (Dr.) Dominic Savio, SJ
- Location: 30, Park Street; Kolkata – 700016
- Campus: Urban
- Colors: Green & Yellow
- Nickname: The Xaverians
- Website: www.sxccal.edu
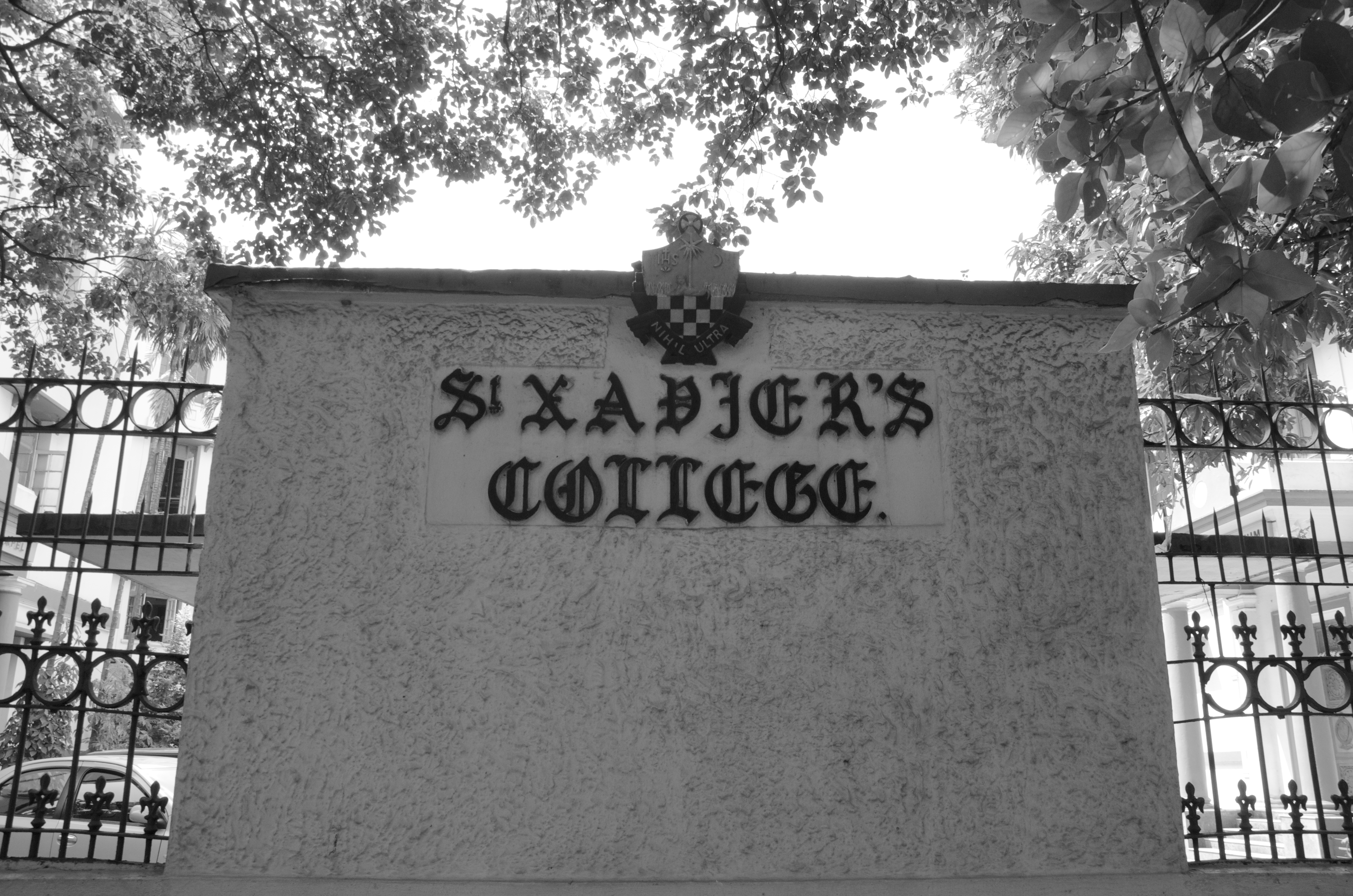

St. Xavier's College, Kolkata is a private, Catholic, autonomous college in Kolkata, India, operated by the Calcutta Province of the Society of Jesus (Jesuits). Founded in 1860, it is named after St. Francis Xavier, a Jesuit saint of the 16th century, who travelled to India. In 2006, it became the first autonomous college in West Bengal. The college is affiliated with the University of Calcutta.

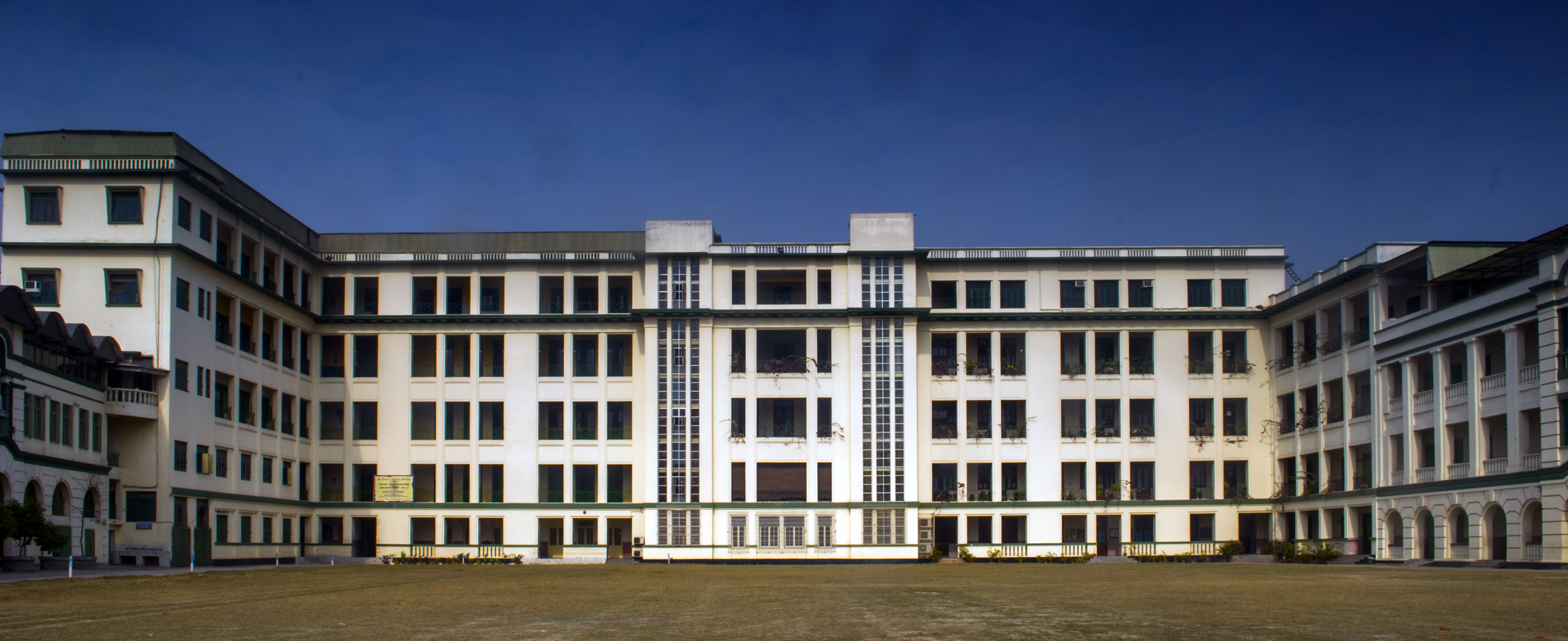
Front facade

St. Xavier's was ranked sixth among colleges in India in the 2024 National Institutional Ranking Framework.

== History ==
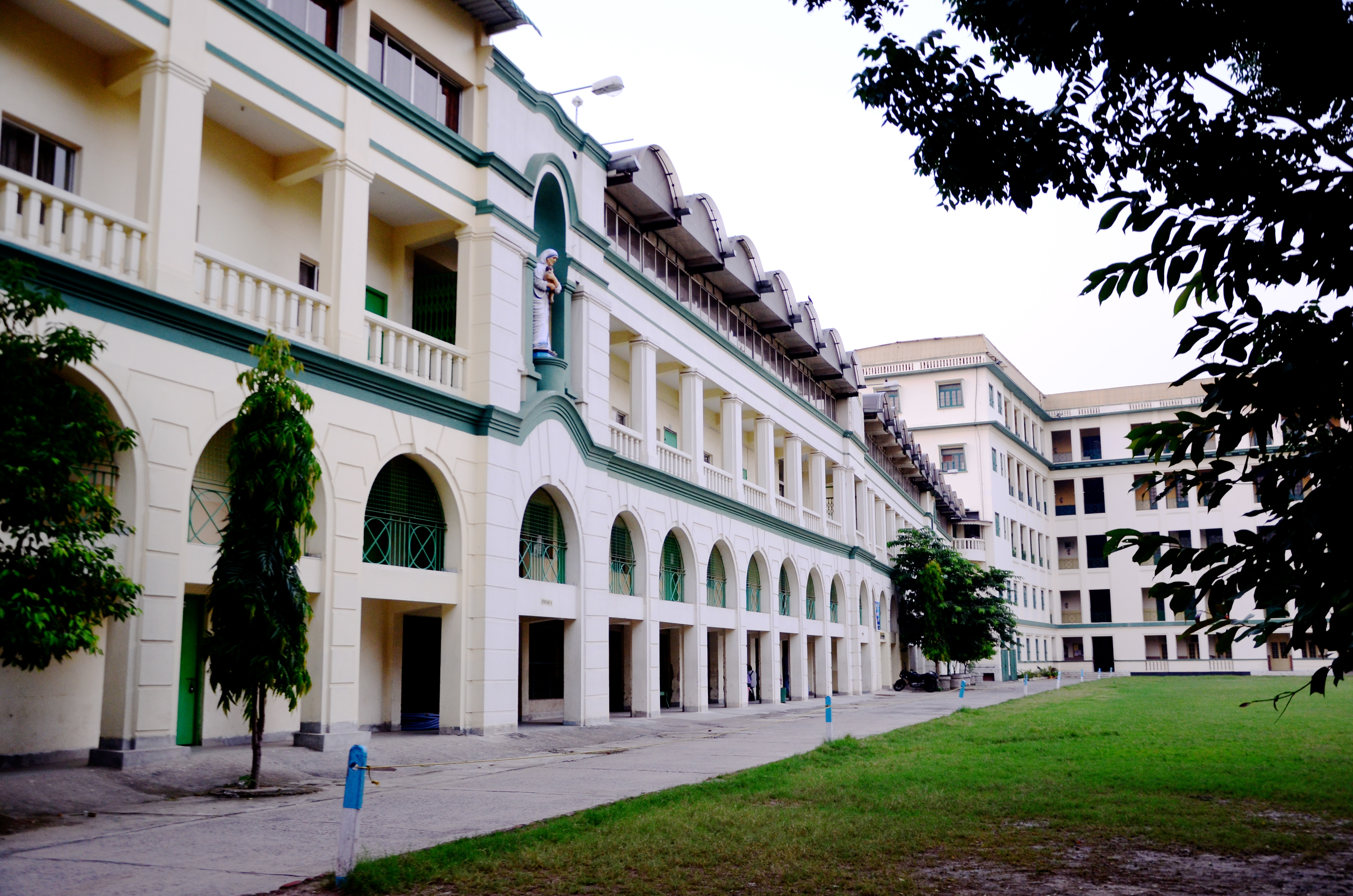
The college campus

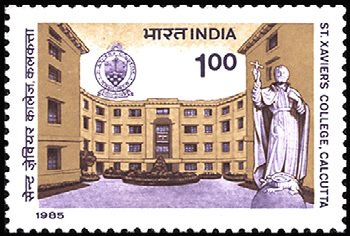
1985 Indian postage stamp commemorating St. Xavier's College, Kolkata.

The college was founded in 1860 by the Jesuits, an all-male Catholic religious order formed by Saint Ignatius of Loyola. The college is named after Francis Xavier, the 16th-century Spanish Jesuit saint. The college was founded by Father Henri Depelchin, SJ. He oversaw most of the groundwork during the foundation years. The college's coat of arms has remained the same since it was adopted in 1905.

=== Sans Souci theatre ===
Before 1843, the Sans Souci theatre was located at 30 Park Street (now Mother Teresa Sarani, Kolkata-700016). In that year a fire broke out, totally destroying the building. The site was later bought by seven Jesuits, who had arrived from Belgium. The present day campus occupies the site.

=== Foundation years ===
The present 30 Park Street address where the college is situated, combines premises numbered 10 and 11, Park Street. Premise number 11, was bought for ₹45,000, by Fr. Depelchen. These funds were made possible with the generous donations of the Anglo-Indians and with assistance from the Jesuit province in Belgium.

Principals
- Verstraeten, SJ (1959–1966)
- Jacques de Bonhome, SJ (1966–1976)
- Joseph D' Souza, SJ (1977–1995)
- P. C. Mathew, SJ (1995–2008)
- John Felix Raj, SJ (2009–2017)
- Dominic Savio, SJ (2017–Incumbent)

The college's first class had forty students. In 1862, two years after its inception, the college was affiliated to the University of Calcutta.

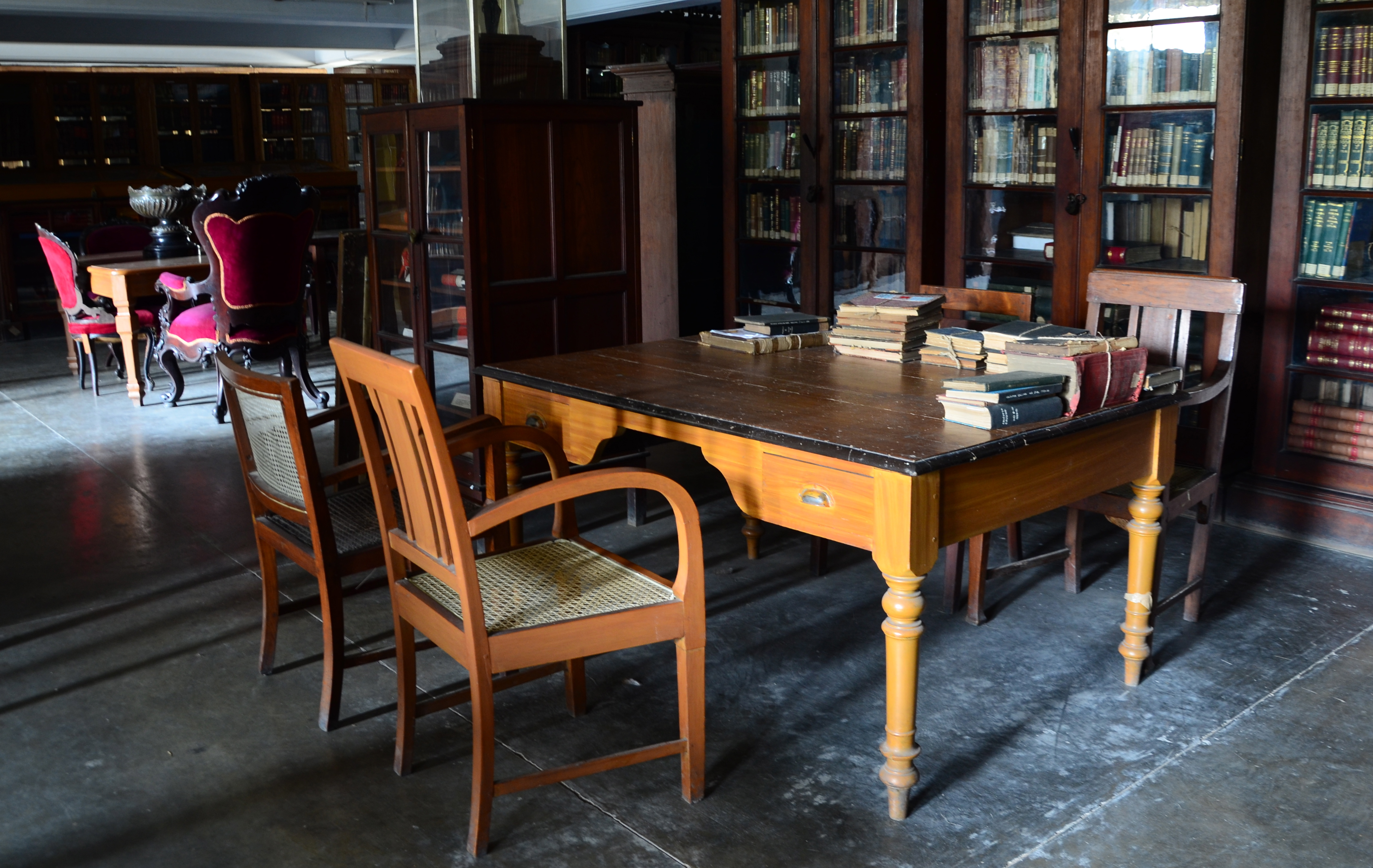
The Goethals library is significant to the history of the institution.

However, there was a shortage of funds for expansion work in terms of classrooms and to accommodate the Jesuit fathers. So the Rector appealed to the public of Calcutta in newspapers for generous assistance and was responded to with magnanimity by well-wishers of the city in 1864. Besides Fr Depelchin and his assistant, Br. Koppes the builder went around personally collecting funds. The present five-storey building was built in six years, from 1934 to 1940, at a cost of Rs 9 lakhs. The funds used to construct the building were collected partly from the public of Calcutta, partly by assistance from Belgium, and also the large rent payment received from the American army that occupied the building during the Second War. Expansion of the college has been a ceaseless effort, with a campus proposed to be constructed Salt Lake City, Kolkata and a second boys' hostel not far away from the existing one.

=== Goethals library ===
The Goethals library, which is located above the College Chapel, houses some of the oldest periodicals, journals and books at the university. The collections were inherited by the Jesuit Fathers in 1908, from the then Archbishop of Calcutta, Paul Goethals, S.J. Today, the collections are well preserved and the library has become an important archival collection.

=== Postage stamp ===
A commemorative stamp was issued by the Indian Post on 12 April 1985 depicting the college campus.

== Courses ==
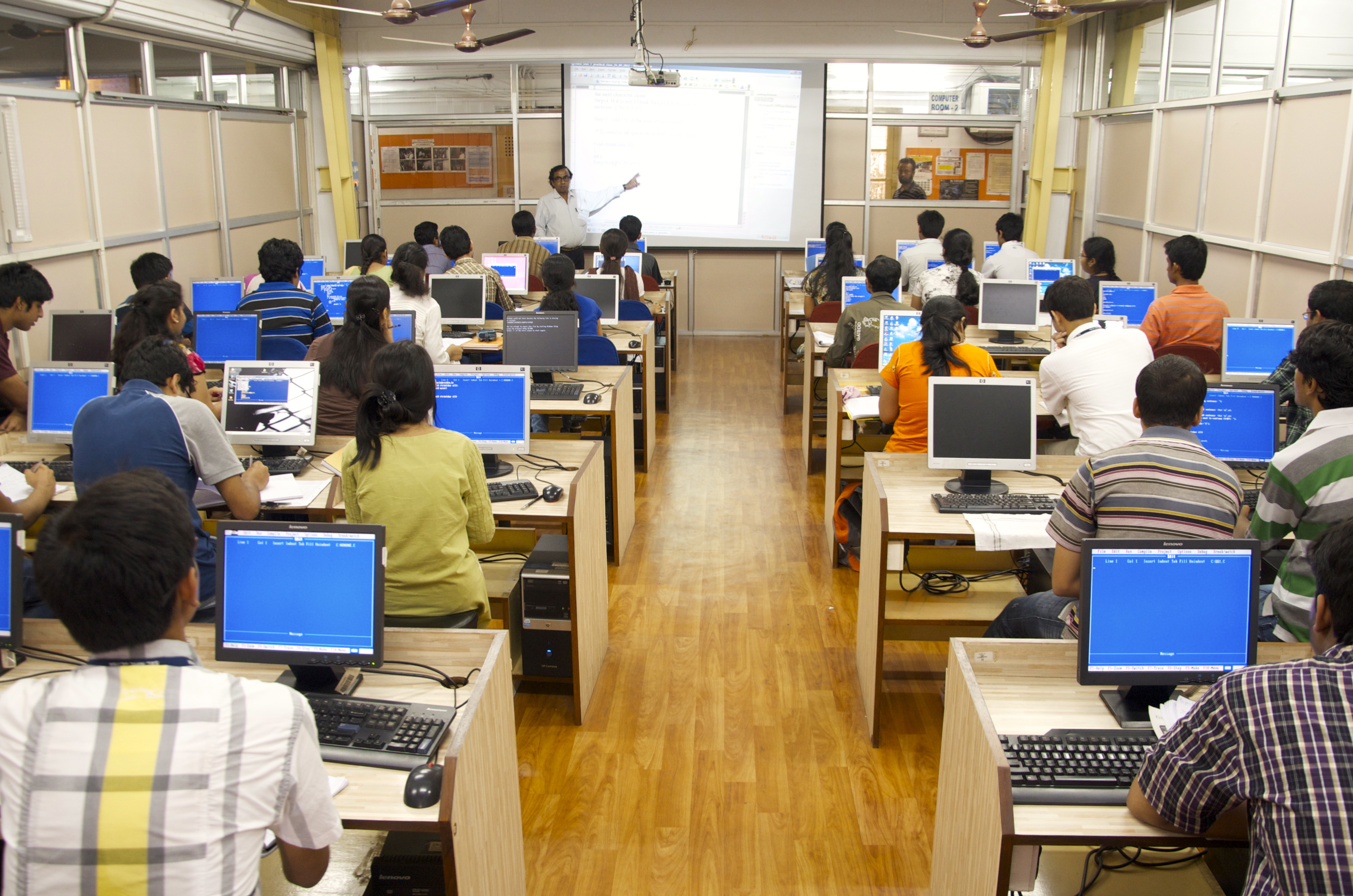
A computer science class

The college has morning session for male students, that offers the Bachelor of Commerce degree. The day section of the college houses the arts and science departments which offer undergraduate (honours) degrees in various subjects such as English, Bengali, political science, sociology, microbiology, computer science, animation and multimedia, mass communication and videography, mathematics, chemistry, physics, economics, statistics and data science. Master's programs in commerce (evening session), biotechnology (integrated five-year MSc), physics, microbiology and education are housed in the college along with the co-educational Bachelor of Commerce (evening) and Bachelor of Business Administration programs. The college has also introduced post-graduate programmes in English, political science and sociology since 2019.

The college, in its first foreign collaboration, has entered into a tie-up with the University of Manitoba, Canada. The MoU was unveiled on 4 Feb 2008 by the principal of the college, Father PC Mathew and the dean of the faculty of food and agricultural sciences at the University of Manitoba, Professor Michael Trevan.

== Infrastructure ==
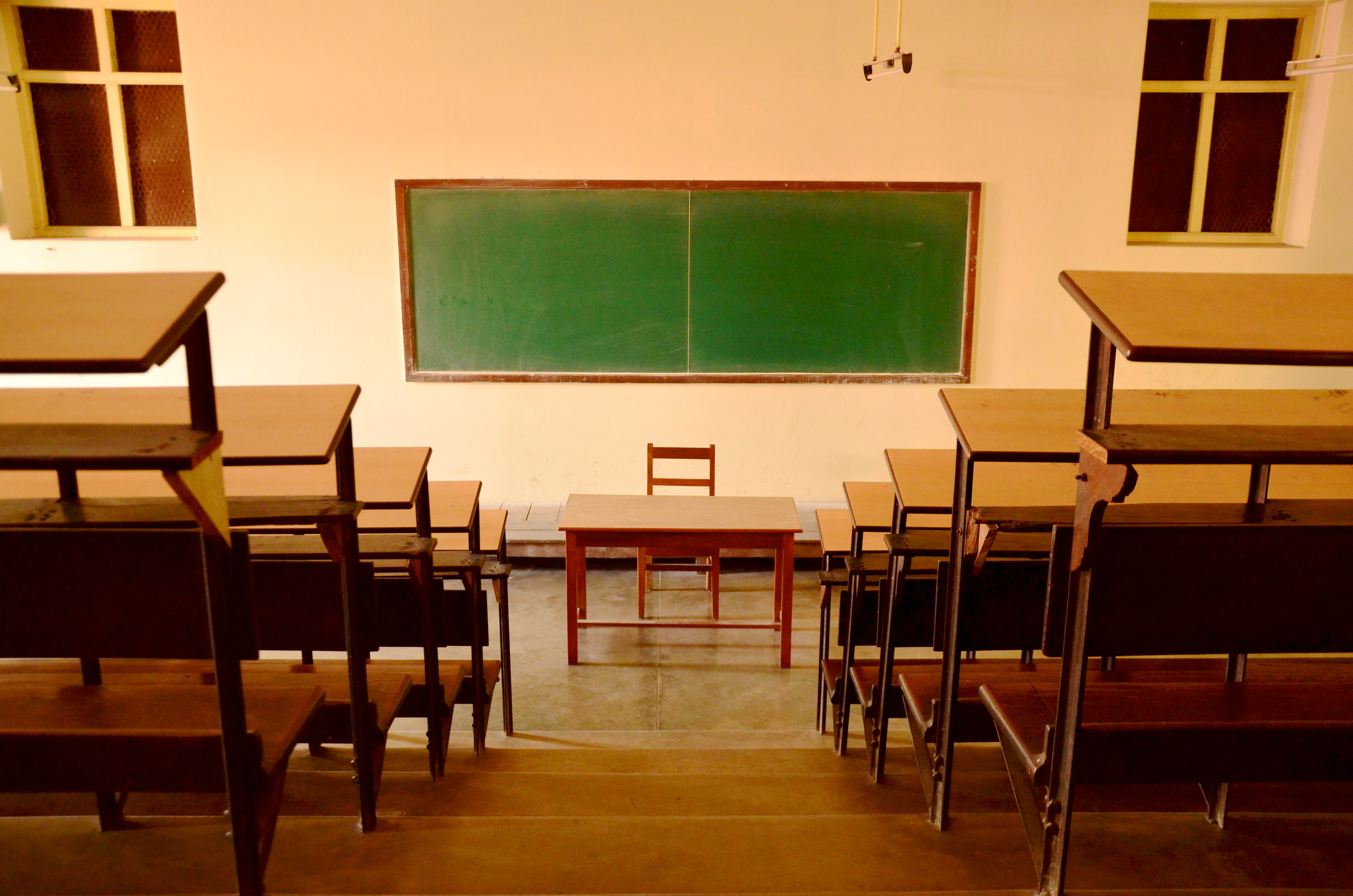
A classroom

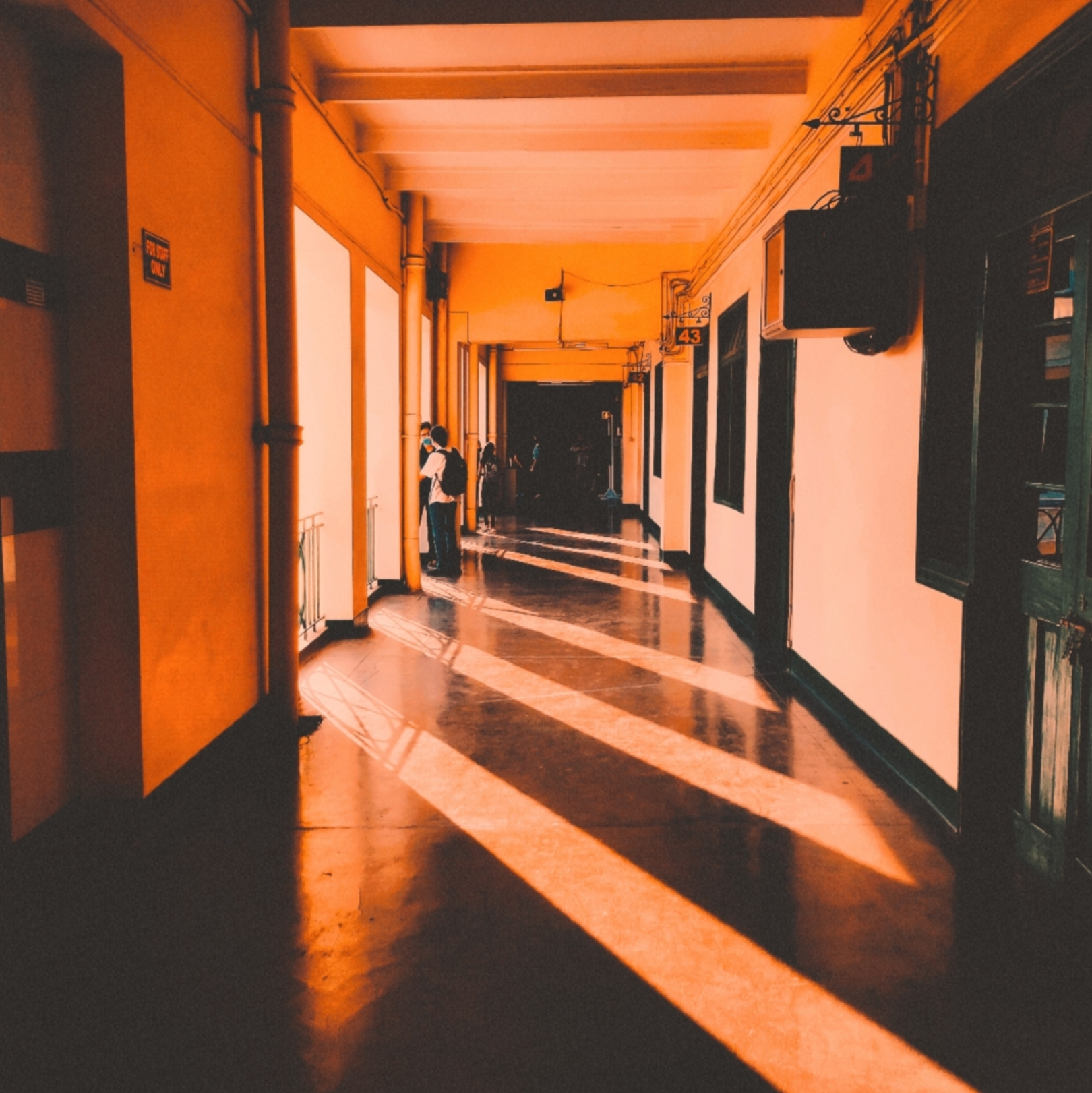
Corridor of St. Xavier's College, Kolkata

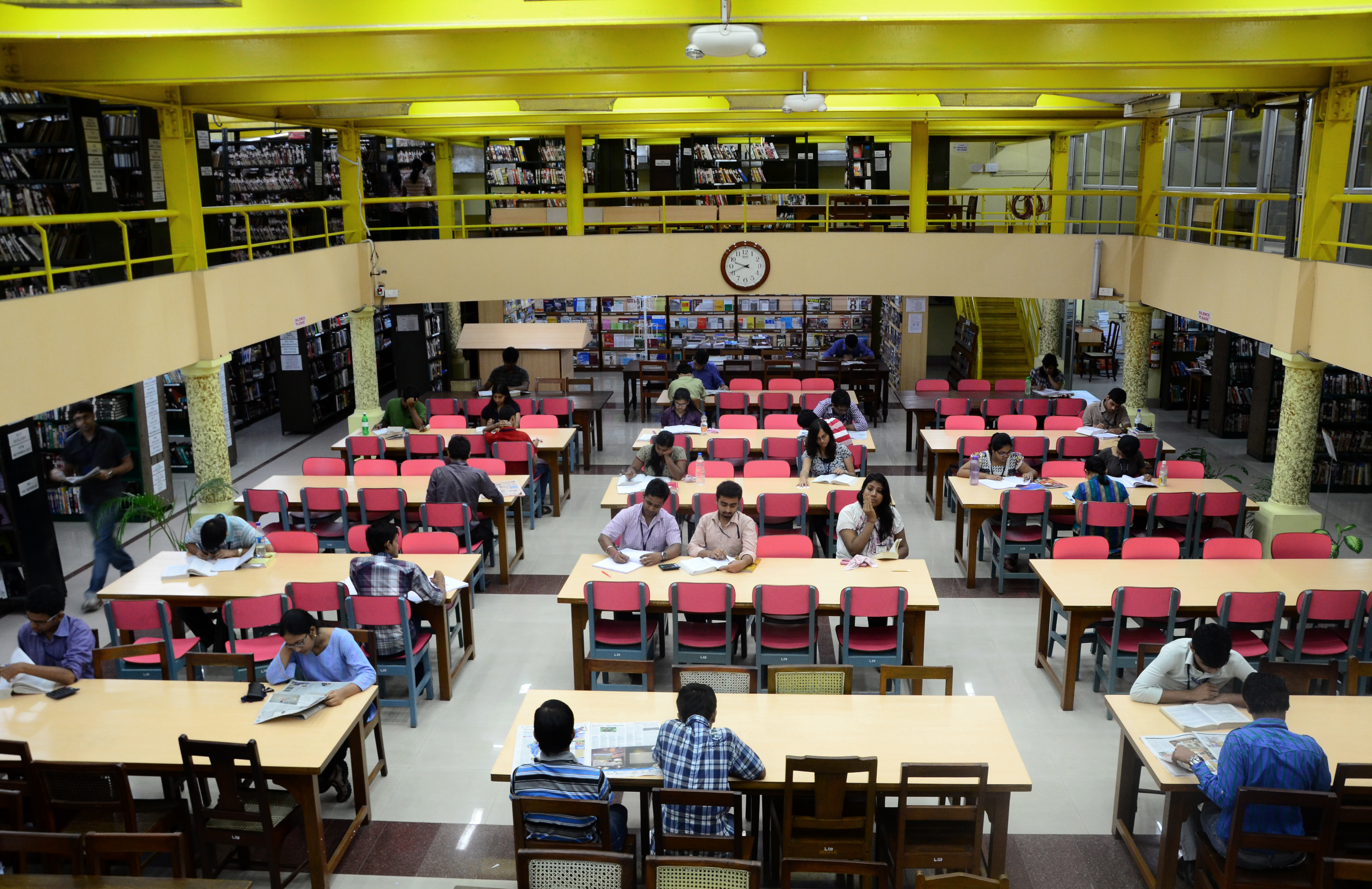
The library

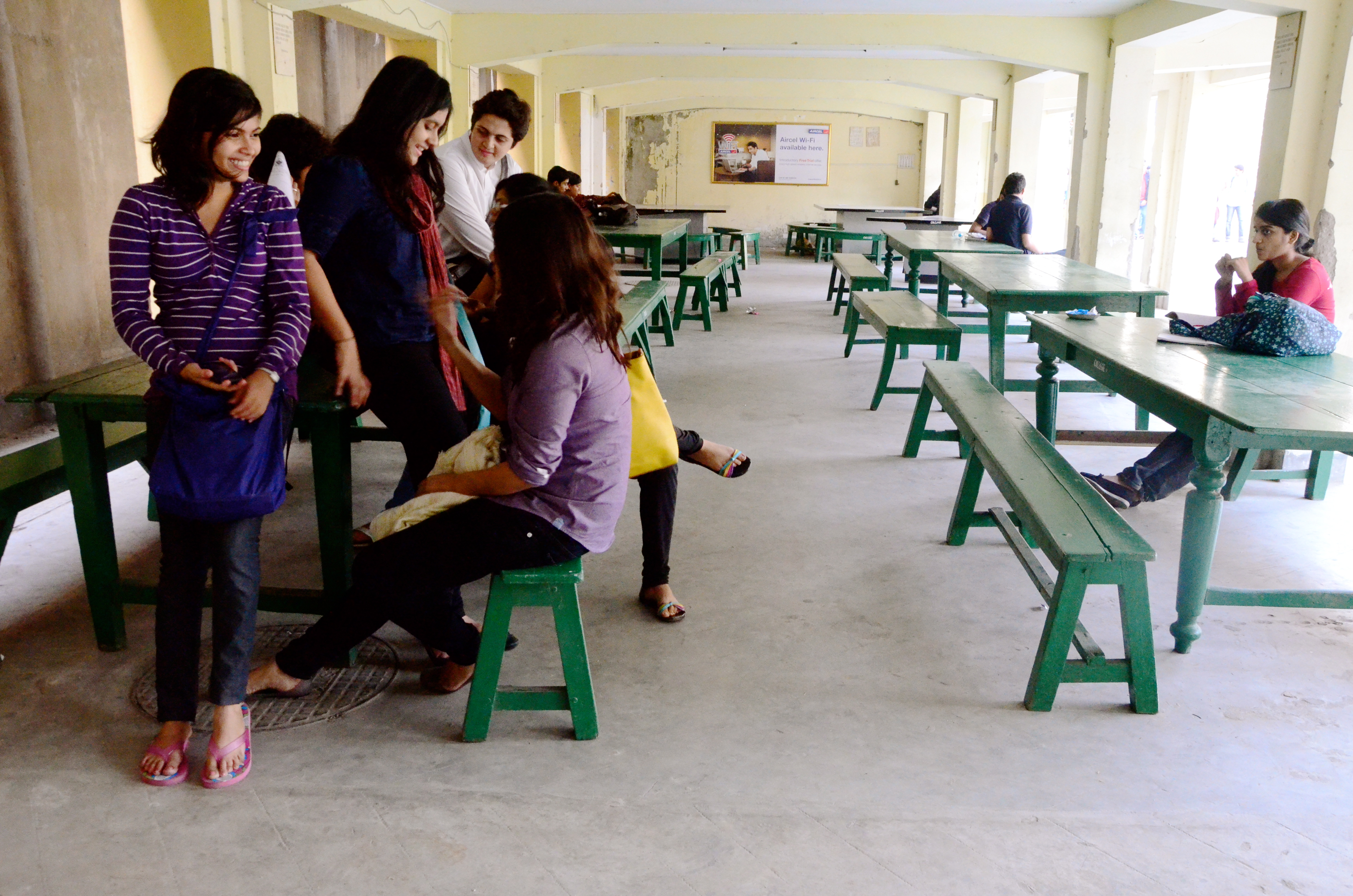
Socialising at the 'green benches'

The college classes are spread over four floors across two buildings. There are over 50 classrooms, six audio-visual rooms and three computer laboratories, each which can accommodate over 70 students.

The college also has physics, chemistry and biotechnology laboratories to support the requirements of their respective departments; the Mass Communication and Videography department has a video library to assist its film students. The Central Library, spread over two floors, houses reference books from a range of different subjects. In addition to numerous periodicals, scientific journals, archives and fiction titles are also available. The auditorium has a seating capacity of over 800 people. The football, and basketball courts are behind the main college building and are shared between the college students and the students of St. Xavier's Collegiate School, the secondary section of which is housed in an adjacent flank of the college building.

The canteen, the "Green Benches": a wi-fi enabled, student hangout area and Fr. Joris's Corner, an in-house stationery shop, are located parallel to the sports grounds. The green benches are a popular spot on the campus.

== Popular culture ==
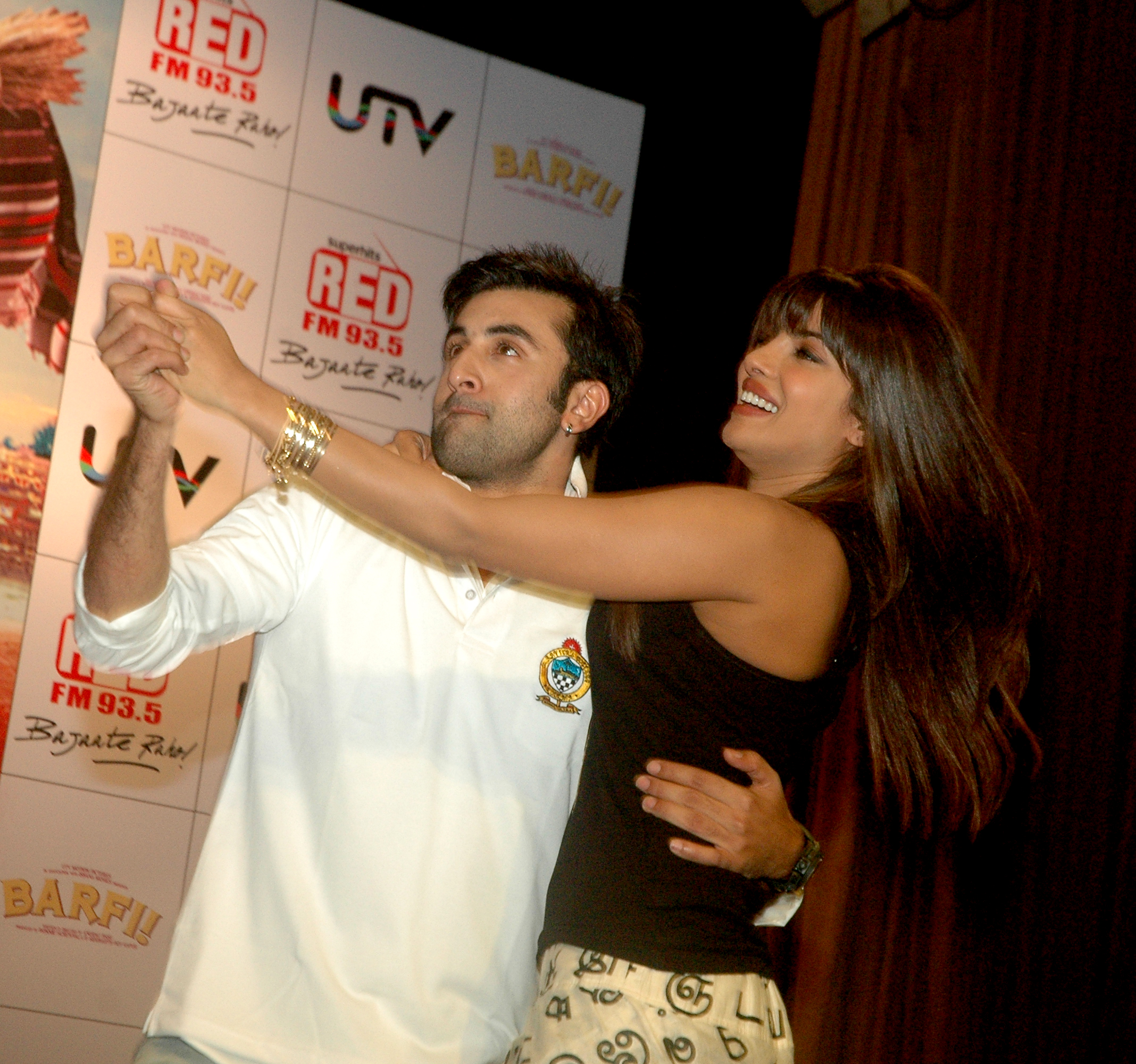
Ranbir Kapoor and Priyanka Chopra, promoting their film Barfi! on the campus

The college has a culture of festivals- inter- and intra-college that span its academic calendar; that apart, the college campus and auditorium are often chosen as venues by other parties, in collaboration with the college, to host discussions and events. The college has also played host to distinguished guests:

- Pranab Mukherjee, former President of India, has also visited the college;
- Manmohan Singh, former Prime Minister of India, visited the campus on the occasion of its 150th anniversary celebrations;

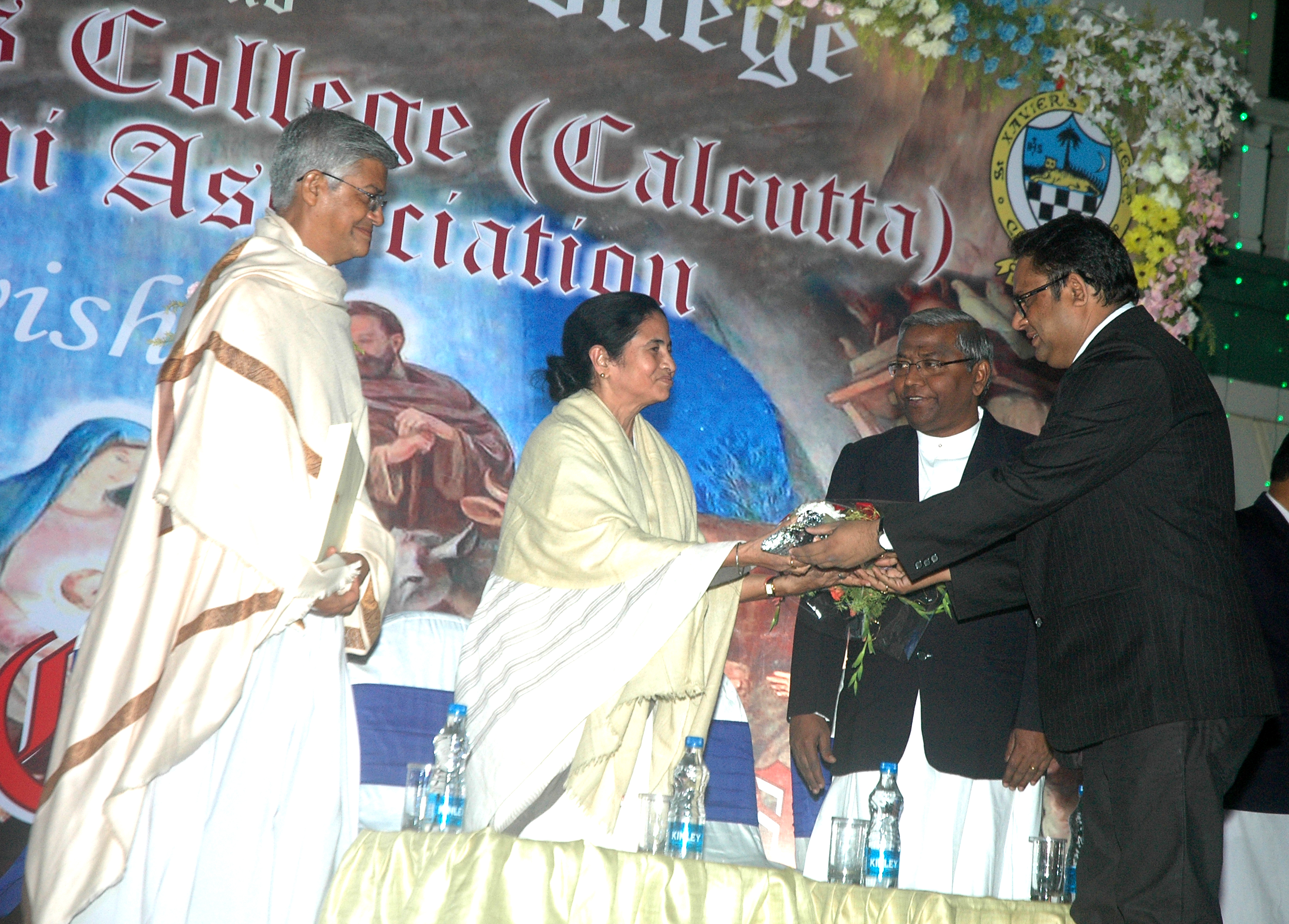
The then CM Mamata Banerjee in the 2011 Convocation Ceremony

=== Convocation – keynote speakers ===
- M. K. Narayanan, former Governor of West Bengal
- P. Chidambaram, former Home Minister and Finance Minister, Government of India
- Mamata Banerjee, former Chief Minister of West Bengal

== Community and clubs ==
Apart from doing service to the community in the educational sphere, St. Xavier's is also involved in the environmental issues, youth welfare, women's welfare and poverty reduction.

The college has an elected non-political student body called St. Xavier's College Student Council (SXCSC) which co-ordinates all the cultural activities on the campus.

The college also has many active clubs, which are aimed at building leadership, creativity and managerial qualities in students. A list of clubs and societies are mentioned below:

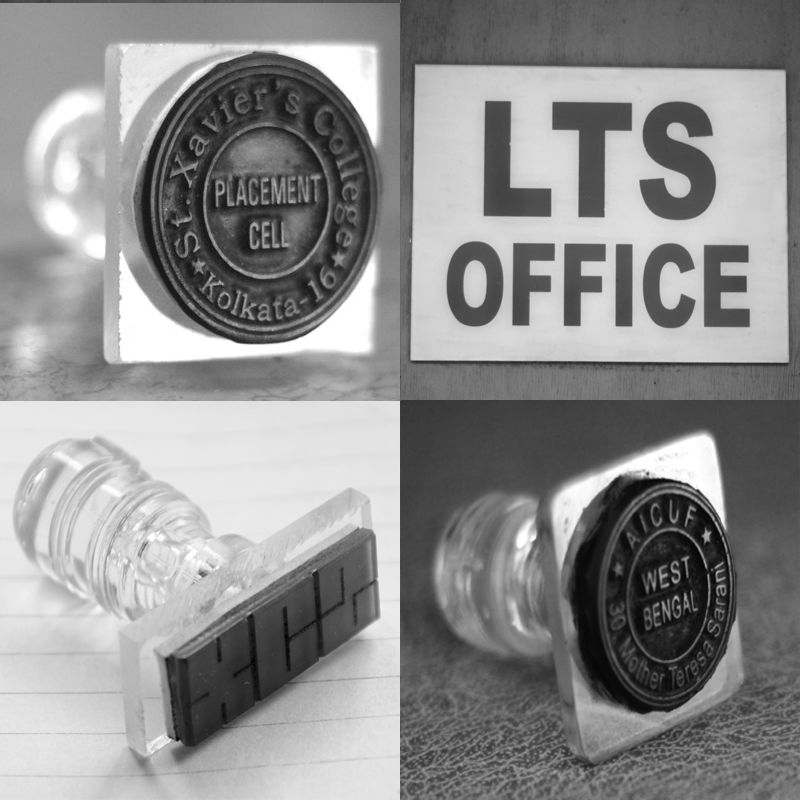
Some of the societies and cells at St. Xavier's

- Enactus SXC
- Entrepreneurship Development Cell and Incubation Centre (EDCIC)
- Fine Arts Society (FAS)
- National Cadet Corps (NCC)
- National Service Scheme (NSS)
- The Sports Department
- Hindi Literary Society (HLS)
- Bengali Literary Society (BLS)
- Xavierian Theatrical Society (XTS)
- Xavier's Academy of Dance & Music (XADAM)
- Xaverian Center for Equality and Liberty (XCEL)
- Xavier's Finance Community (XFC)
- Xavier's Commerce Society (XCS)
- Xavier's Management Society (XMS)
- Leadership Training Service (LTS)
- The English Academy
- The Debating Society (XDS)
- The Placement Cell
- Xavier's Consulting Club (XCC)
- Xaverian Astronomical Society (XAS)
- Xaverian Film Academy (XFA)
- Xavier's Sociological Society (XSS)
- HULT Prize SXC
- Electoral Literacy Club
- The Marketing Society, SXC
- Xavier's E-Sports Society (XESS)

== Sports and festivals ==
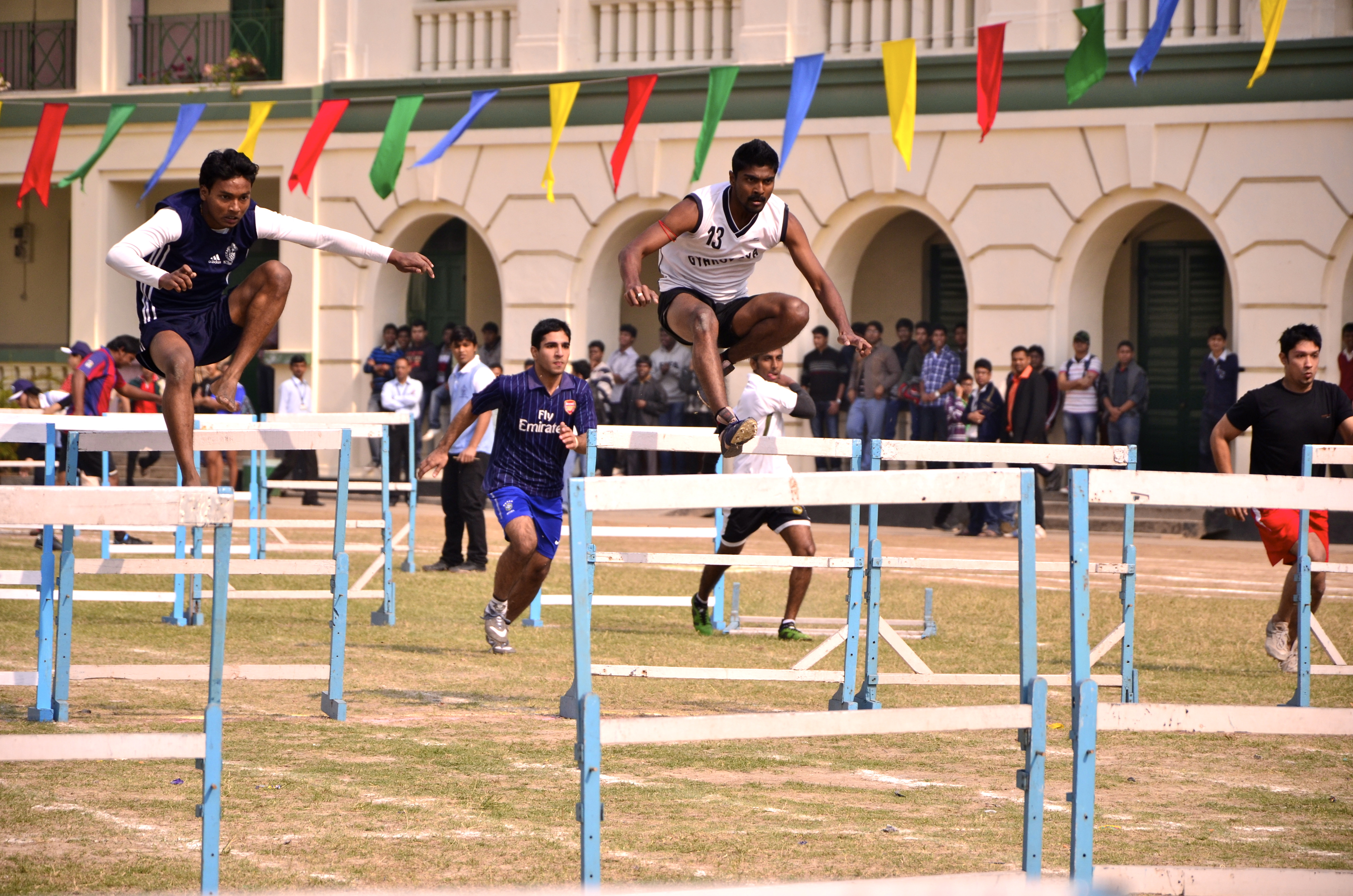
Sports day

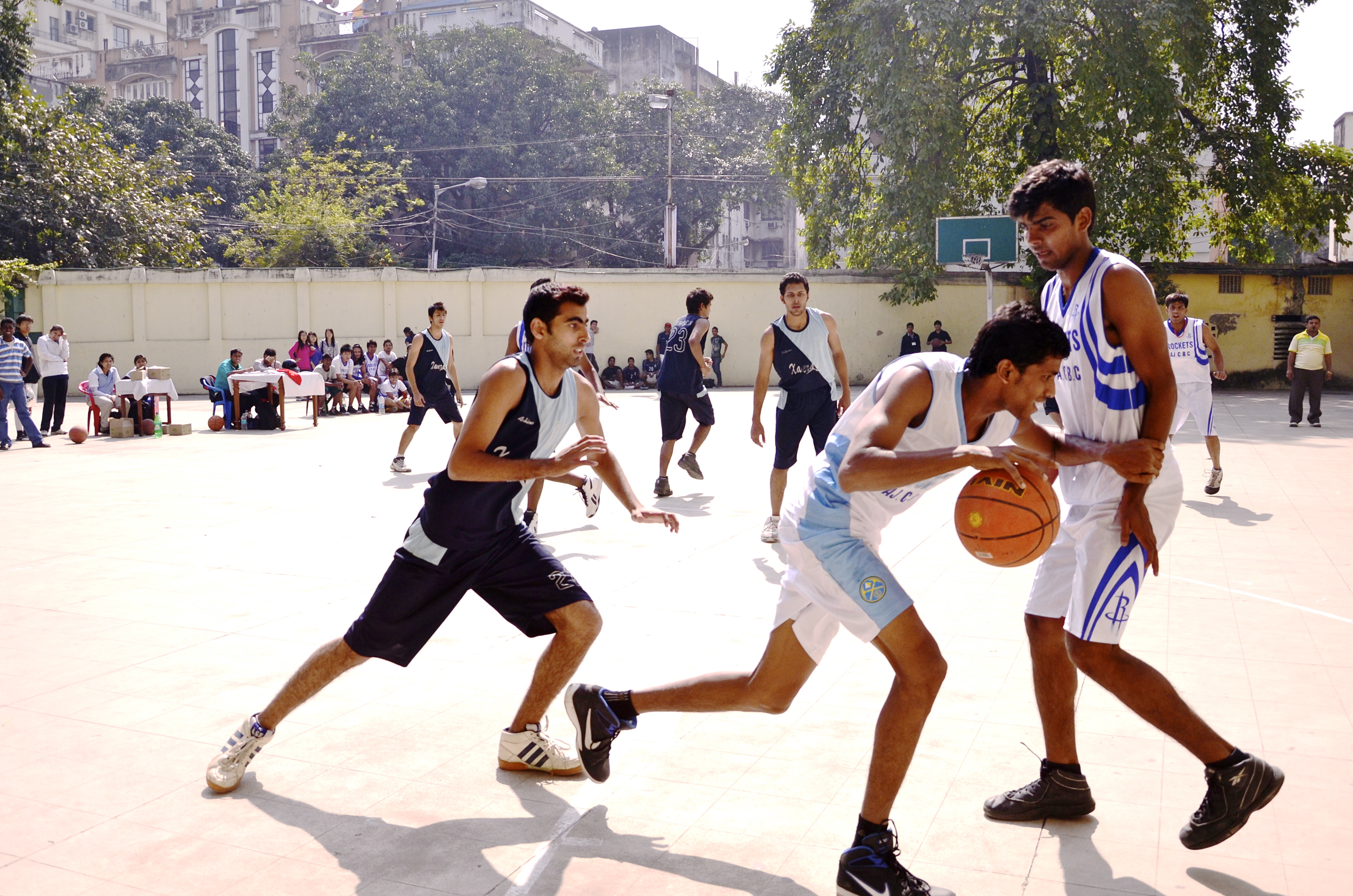
Intra-college basketball

The college has facilities for playing sports and activities such as: football, basketball, hockey, volleyball, cricket, table tennis, badminton, carrom and foosball. These games are played throughout the year at both intra-college and inter-college levels.

A sports day is organised every year in December. Students of the college compete in various track and field events on the day.

- Xavotsav, the cultural festival is held annually in late January or early February. Most colleges of Kolkata are invited to participate in events like band performance, Neon dance, classical dance, singing etc. This festival is organised by the Students Union along with the alumni body of the college.
- Prism is the annual corporate simulation organised by EDC for first years.
- Inertia, the international marketing festival is held annually in February or March. The events comprise ambush marketing, ad spoof, brand manager, international trade and crisis management. The participants of this festival are undergraduate as well as post-graduate students from around India and its neighbouring countries. This festival is organised by the students and professors of the department of management (Commerce).
- Insignia, the management festival is held annually in mid February. The top ten commerce colleges of India are invited to compete in events like human resource management (HRM), best manager, business quiz, marketing and entrepreneurship Development (ED) among many other events. This festival is organised by the students of the bachelors of commerce department (B.Com.).
- Xavier's Management Convention (XMC), the management festival is held annually in February or March. XMC is a national festival. It includes events like stress interview (SI), B-Quiz (BQ), business plans (BP) and advertising. This festival is organised by the students of the Bachelors of Business Administration (BBA) department.
- Entrepreneurship Awareness Camp (EAC), organised by the EDC is an entrepreneurial boot camp session that spans over two to three days and features speaker sessions by eminent personalities of the start-up world, and mentoring and investing sessions for start-ups that participate in the event from across the country.
- Spectrum is the festival of the department of physics. It comprises debate, quiz, drama, lectures by famous Nobel laureates and many more. It generally spans for a period of two days.

St. Xavier's is the only English medium college to have separate festivals for Hindi and Bengali.

- Vividha, the Hindi festival, comprises events like drama competition, extempore, elocution etc. The mode of communication throughout the festival is Hindi. This festival is organised by the members of the Hindi Literary Society (HLS).
- Xavullash, the Bengali festival, comprises events like debate, extempore, elocution etc. The mode of communication throughout the festival is Bengali. This festival is organised by the members of the Bengali Literary Society (BLS).
- The Department of Political Science inaugurated 3 major programmes since 2016 - Suffragium started as the department's annual event. The day starts with the launching of the departmental journal Politique and offers a Q&A session between the students and the panellists comprising esteemed political scientists and researchers. The day also includes activities likepPoli-Rattle (Just-A-Minute), polo-verse and expeditious (political quiz). Sansad is a mock parliament wherein students engage in a support/oppose debate on any political agenda acting as a simulation of the Lok Sabha.

== Publications ==
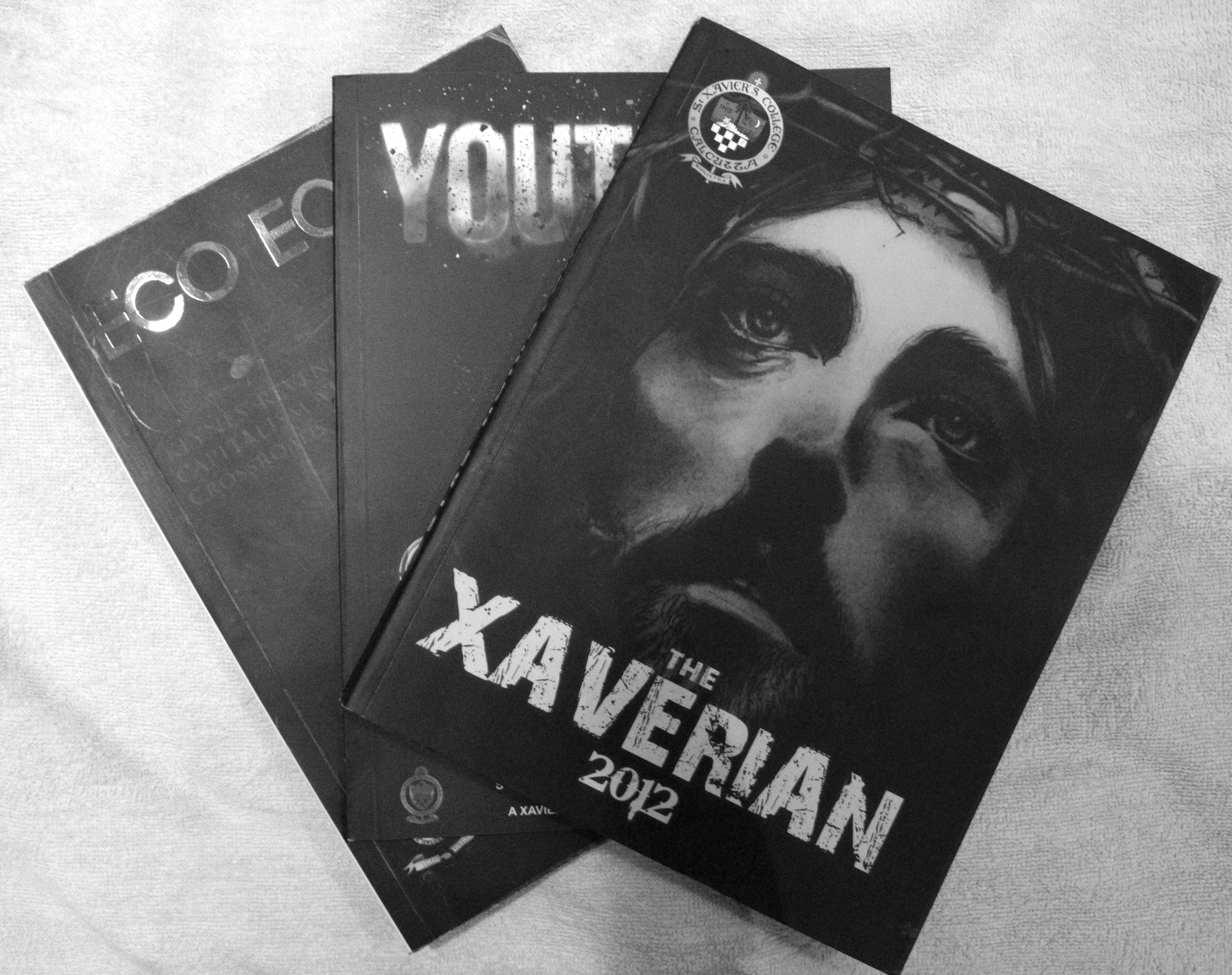
College magazines

A list of magazines that college students publish every year. These magazines are widely appreciated in academic circles:

- Xaverian: includes articles by students and staff members, who share their experiences at the college. It also includes interviews with famous alumni members and photos of passing out batches.
- Youthink, the annual commerce journal which includes articles from students and staff members on current commerce related issues. The topics in the past volumes were The Business of Sports, Turbulent Times, Superpowers, Change and The Gamble.
- Ode To Expressions is the annual magazine published by the English Academy. The magazine has featured columns by personalities such as Shashi Tharoor and Devdutt Pattanaik, among others.
- Young Sociologist is the annual sociological journal published by the Xavier's Sociological Society under the purview of the Department of Sociology.
- Eco Echoes is the annual economics journal published by the Economics Department.
- Horizon is the annual physics journal published by the Department of Physics. It highlights the technological advancements of the world.
- Pebble is the annual journal published by the St Xavier's College Science Association (SXCSA).
- Politique is the annual political journal published by the department of political science that includes students' articles based on current affairs and global issues.

== Philanthropy and social activities ==
Prayas, a 3-day boot camp aimed at making underprivileged children aware of the importance of higher education was started in 2006 by the then principal of the college, Rev. Felix Raj, S.J. In the boot-camp, underprivileged children are brought to the college campus from nearby villages and slums for a fun-filled day of activity and entertainment. Children are provided with free meals and gifts. This festival is organised by the social work department (under the National Service Scheme) of the university.

== Alumni association ==
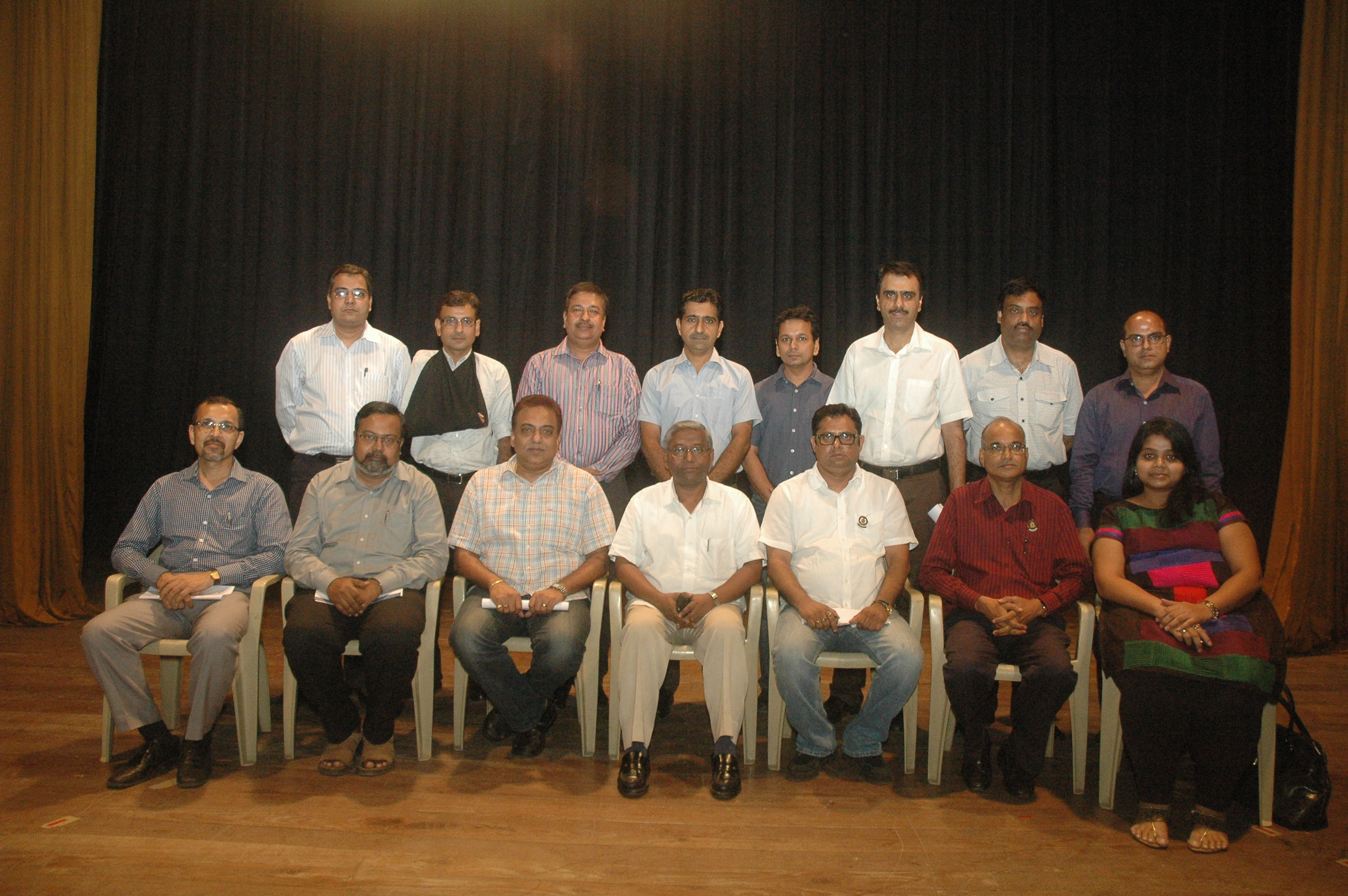
SXCAA committee 2012–13

The college has a very active alumni association known as SXCAA, whose president is principal of the college. The association supports the college in several projects by extending financial and managerial assistance. SXCAA is registered under the West Bengal Societies Registration Act. It was the first alumni association in Kolkata to be granted 80G Certification from the Income Tax Department, in recognition of its philanthropic activities.

SXCAA has been expanding its reach to ex-students by opening chapters in several cities around the world, including Bengaluru, Mumbai, Delhi, Singapore, London, Dubai, New York and Dhaka.

Project 'Lakshaya' was launched by the college to invite donations from alumni to fund a new campus. The Government of West Bengal allotted the college 16 acres (6.5 ha) of land at Rajarhat (New Town) for the new campus. The land will cost a subsidised ₹640 million.

== Rankings ==
As of 2024, the college is ranked 6th in India by the National Institutional Ranking Framework.

St. Xavier's College, Kolkata, all India Rankings
Department/Course	2012	2011	2010	2009	2008	2007	2006
Commerce/B.Com	2nd	2nd	2nd	2nd	1st	2nd	3rd
Science/BSc	4th	3rd	5th	3rd	5th	2nd	8th
Arts/BA	5th	7th	5th	5th	9th	5th	6th

== Notable alumni ==
- A. F. Hassan Ariff – Former Attorney General For Bangladesh and Former adviser(Cabinet Minister) to the caretaker Government of Bangladesh.
- Saifuddin Ahmed (academic) – Professor, Nanyang Technological University
- Tarasankar Bandyopadhyay – Novelist, awarded Padma Bhushan
- Chandrajit Banerjee – Director General of Confederation of Indian Industry
- Victor Banerjee – actor
- Aditya Vikram Birla – Former Chairman of Aditya Birla Group
- Jeremy Bujakowski – Polish-Indian alpine skier
- Lagnajita Chakraborty – playback singer
- Ramananda Chatterjee – Journalist
- Pramatha Chaudhuri – Writer during the Bengal Renaissance
- Utpal Dutt – Actor, awarded Sangeet Natak Akademi Fellowship and National Film Award for Best Actor, 1970
- Syed Manzur Elahi – Former adviser to the Caretaker Government of Bangladesh
- Sourav Ganguly – former Captain of Indian Cricket Team and former President of BCCI
- R. Gopalakrishnan – Executive Director of Tata Sons
- Chinmoy Guha – Former Head of the English Department, University of Calcutta, Sahitya Akademi Award winner (2019)
- Sunil Janah - Indian Photojournalist and documentary photographer, was awarded Padma Bhushan in 2012.
- Vijay Mallya – businessman and politician
- Sombhu Mitra – Indian film actor, received the Padma Bhushan and Ramon Magsaysay Award
- Indra Prasanna Mukerji - former Chief Justice of Meghalaya High Court
- Kamal Nath – former Chief Minister of Madhya Pradesh and Union Minister - Government of India, 9 time Member of Parliament, Lok Sabha
- Kazi Nuruzzaman – Soldier in Bangladesh Liberation War, awarded Bir Uttom
- Norman Pritchard - British Indian Olympian, winner of silver medals in the Men's 200m and 200m hurdles at the 1900 Paris Olympics
- Hamoodur Rahman – 7th Chief Justice of Pakistan
- Siddhartha Shankar Ray – former Chief Minister of West Bengal
- Amar Singh – Indian Politician
- Shashi Tharoor – politician, Member of Parliament, Diplomat at the UN, Author.
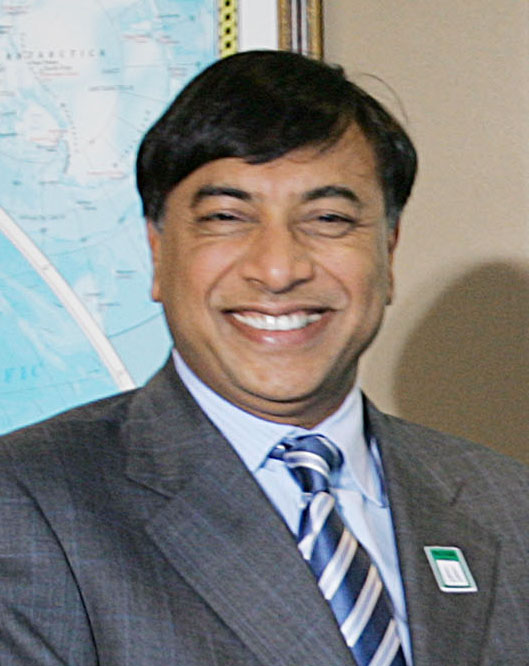
Lakshmi Mittal
Chairman & CEO,
ArcelorMittal

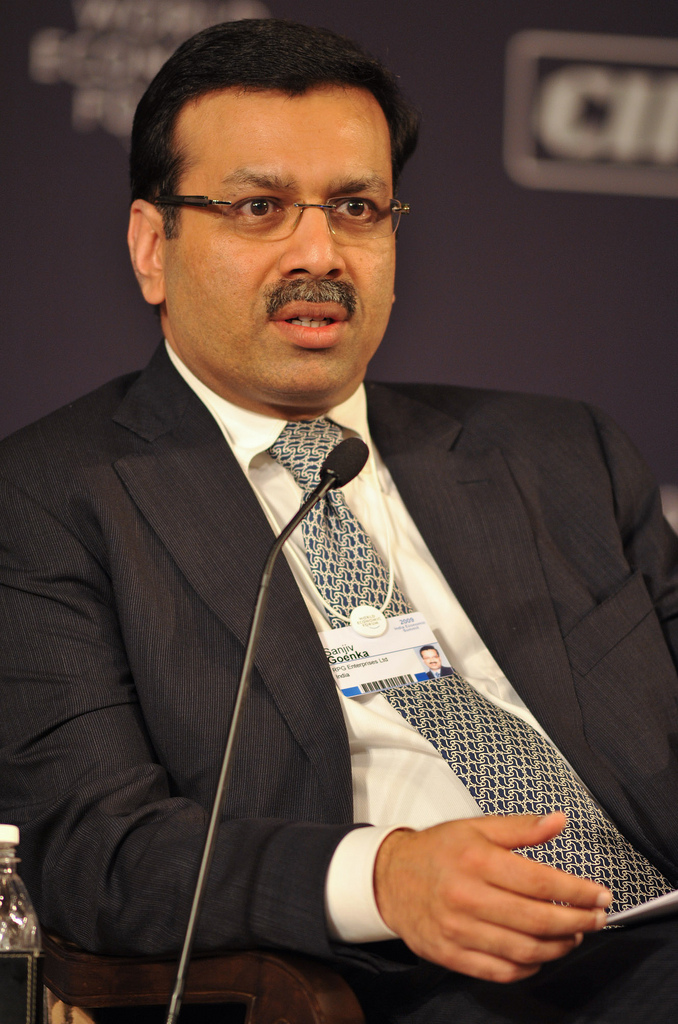
Sanjiv Goenka
Vice Chairman,
RPG

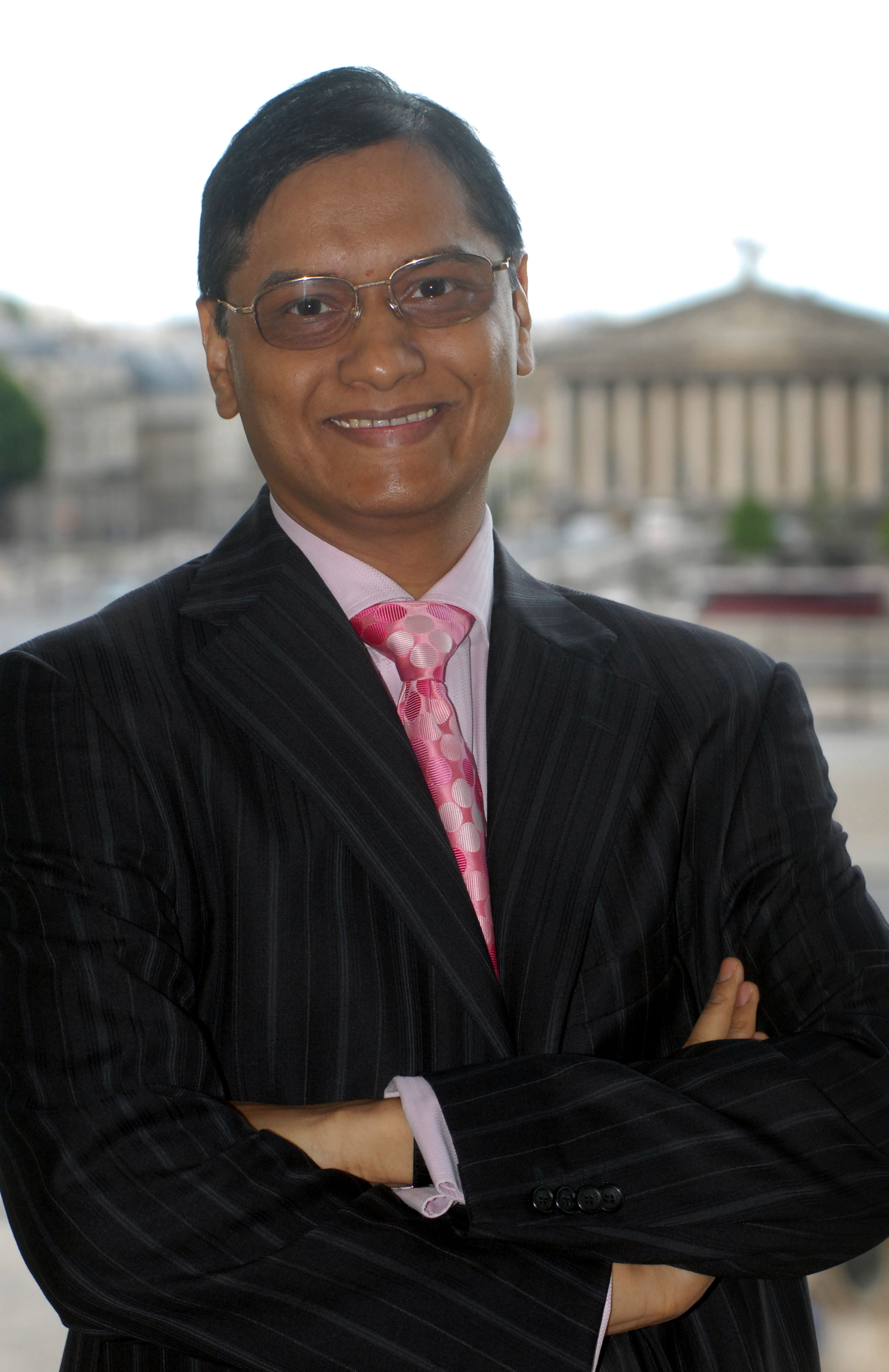
Vinay Maloo
Chairman,
Enso Group

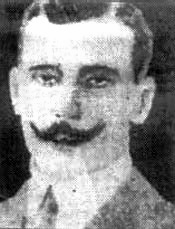
Norman Pritchard
Dual Silver Medalist,
1900 Paris Olympics

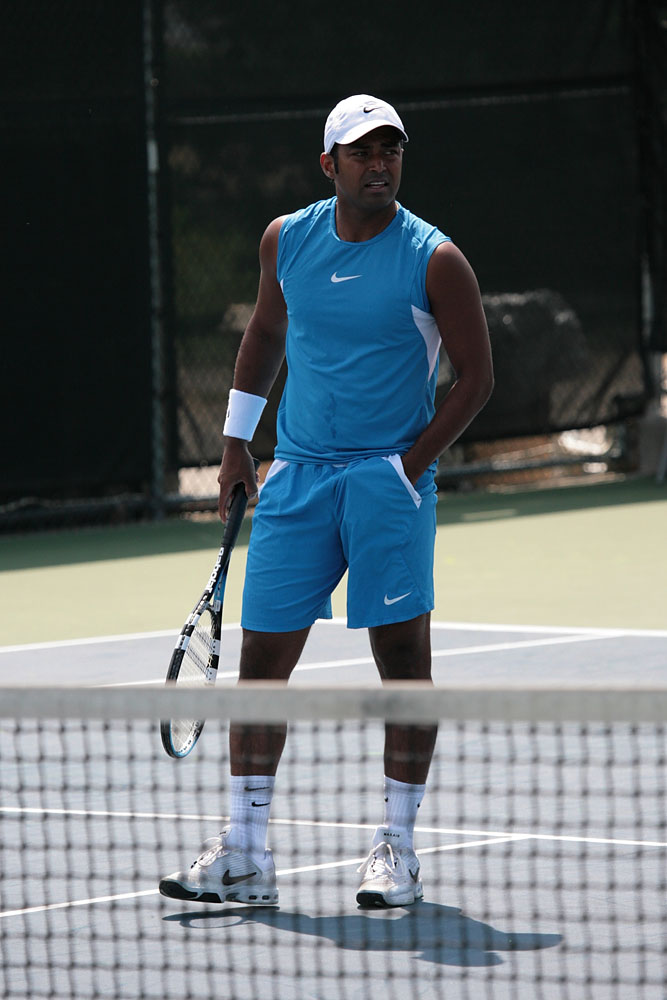
Leander Paes
Bronze Medalist,
1996 Atlanta Olympics

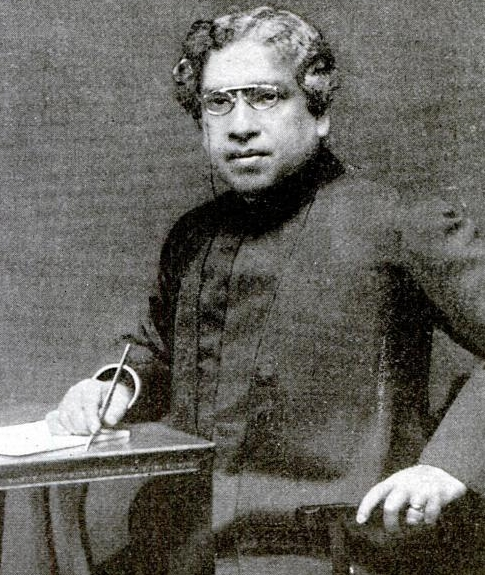
Jagadish Chandra Bose
Preeminent Scientist,
Fellow of the Royal Society

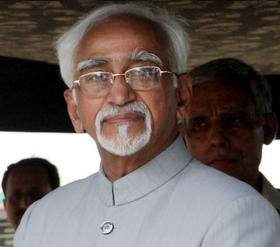
M. Hamid Ansari
Former Vice-President,
India

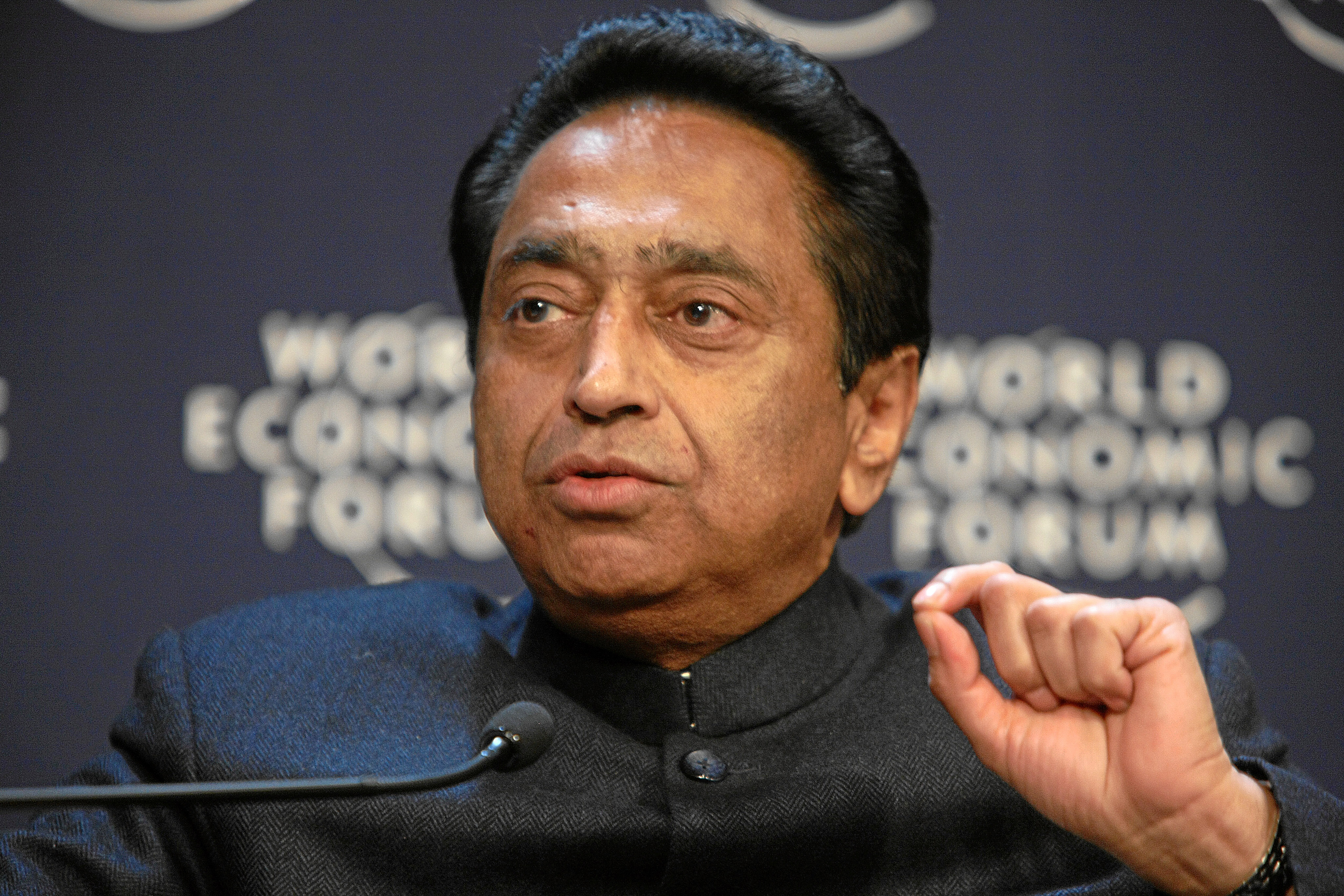
Kamal Nath
Member of Parliament, former Chief Minister of Madhya Pradesh

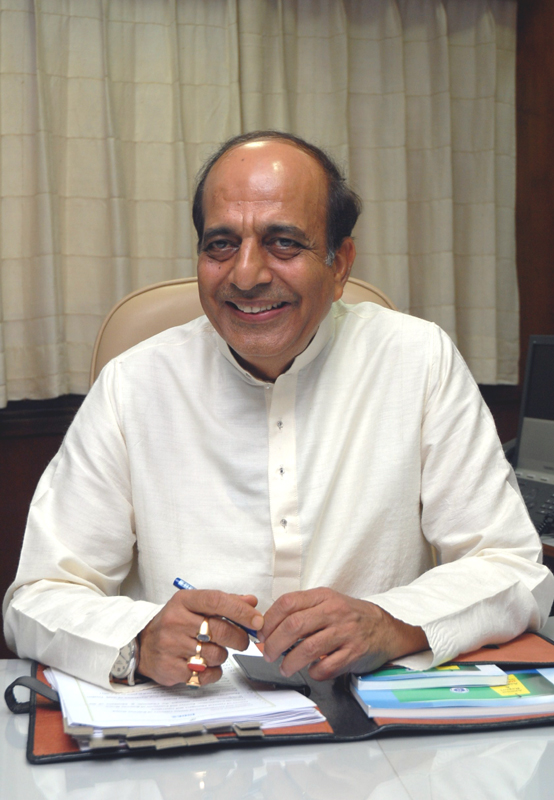
Dinesh Trivedi
High commissioner of India to Bangladesh

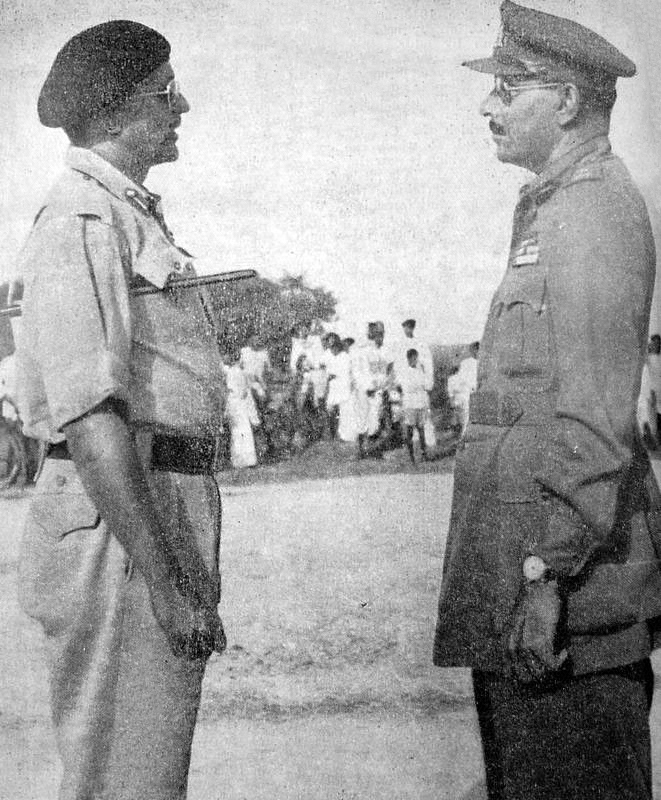
Jayanto Nath Chaudhuri
8th Chief of Army Staff

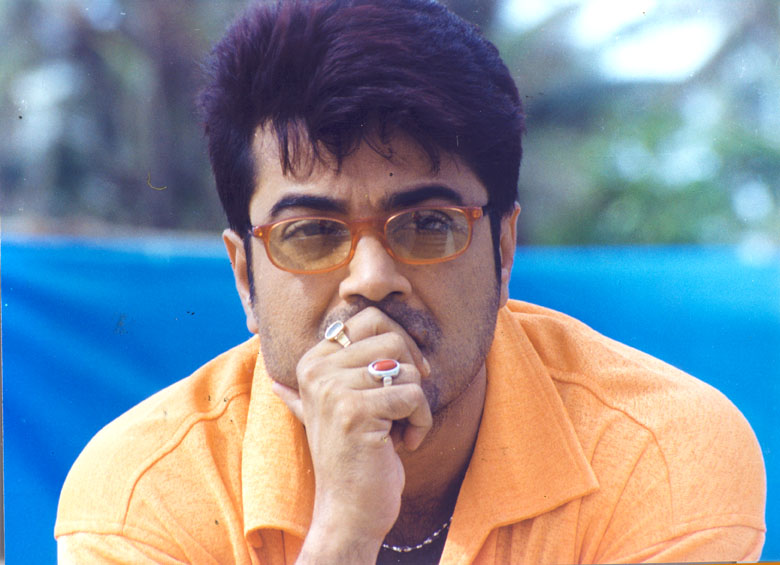
Prosenjit Chatterjee
National Film Award,
Jury Award, 2007

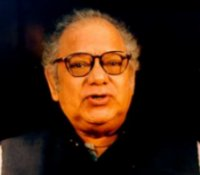
Buddhadeb Guha
Recipient of,
Ananda Puraskar

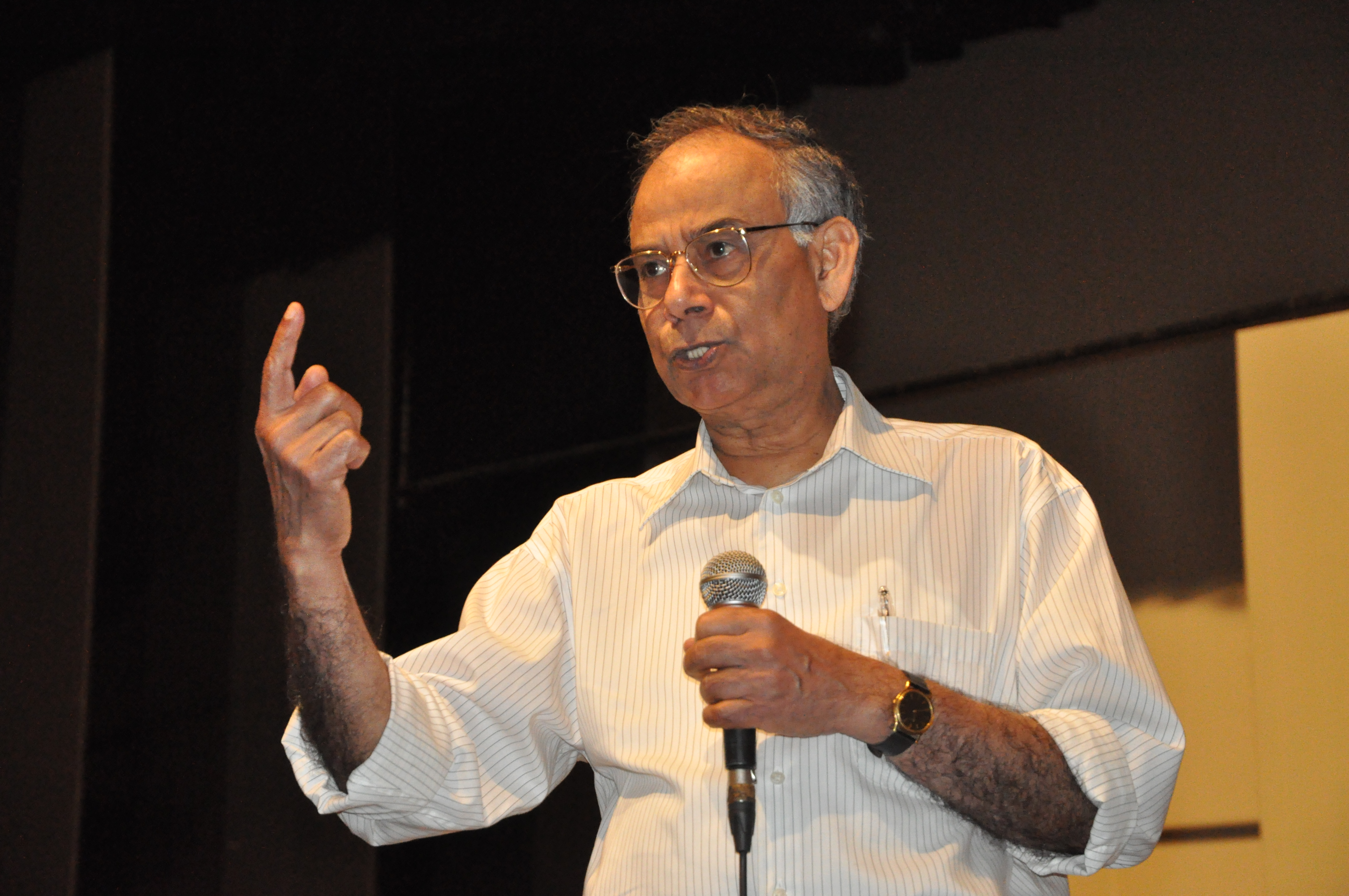
Ananda Chakrabarty
Microbiologist

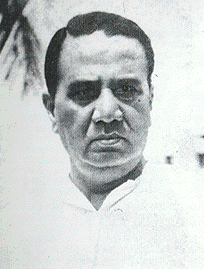
Huseyn Suhrawardy
Fifth,
Prime Minister of Pakistan

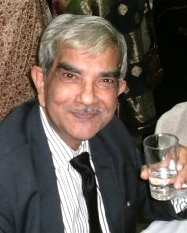
Jamal Nazrul Islam
Physicist, Mathematician,
Astronomer, Cosmologist

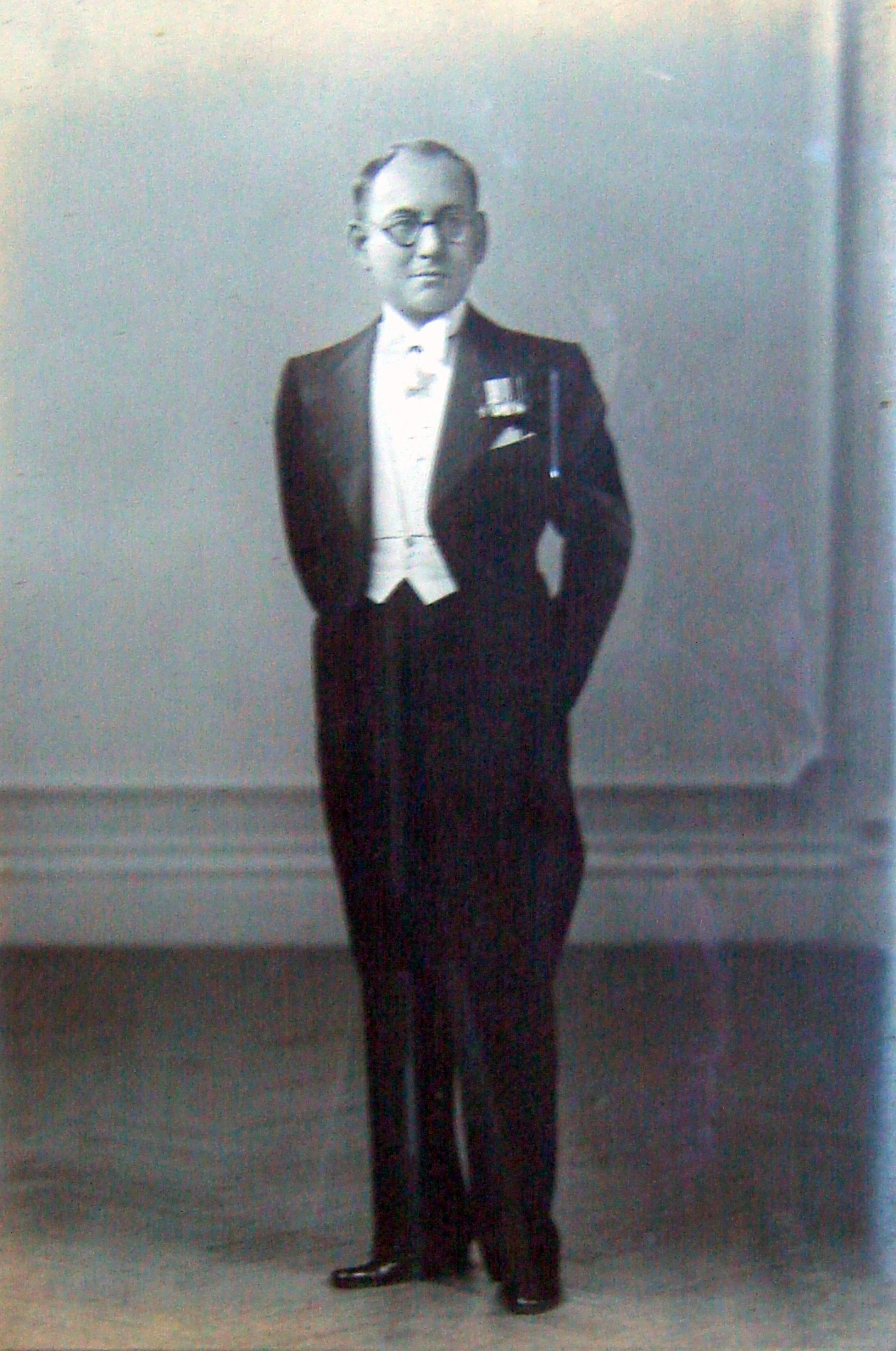
Kaji Manik Lal Rajbhandari
Nepalese politician

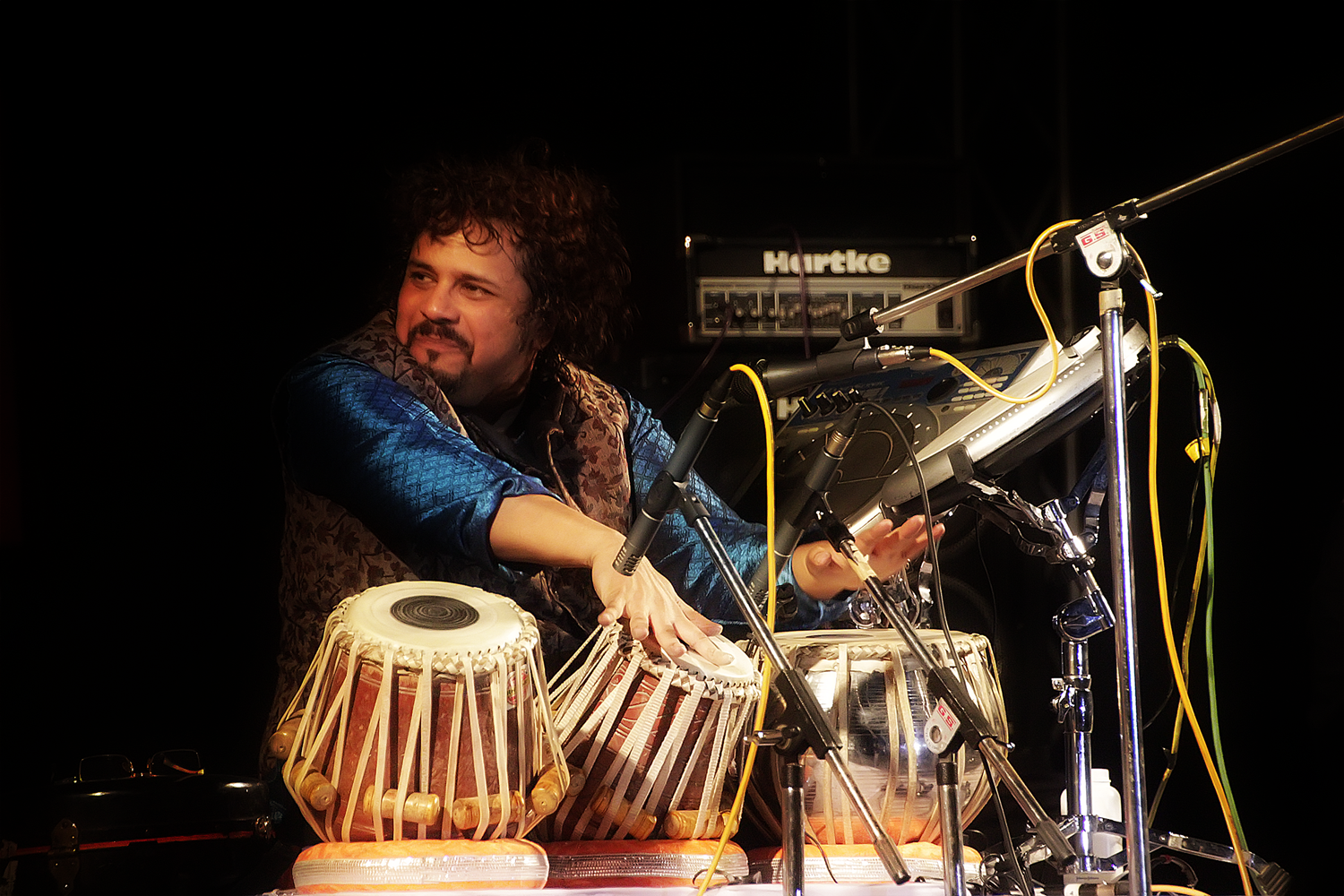
Bikram Ghosh, musician

== See also ==
- St. Xavier's Collegiate School
- List of Jesuit sites
- List of schools named after Francis Xavier
