= Kaji Manik Lal Rajbhandari =

Nepalese politician (born 1880)

Kaji Manik Lal Rajbhandari (1880-?) was a Nepalese politician. He served as Minister for Public Works, Communication, Law and Parliamentary Affairs, Health, and Local Self Governance in the Advisory Council government from August 1952 until June 1953. Kaji Manik Lal Rajbhandari was the father of Late Mananiya Shree Ganapat Lal Rajbhandari and Late Manik Laxmi Amatya who had two children, Mrigendra Bahadur Amatya and Sarojini Lata Amatya.

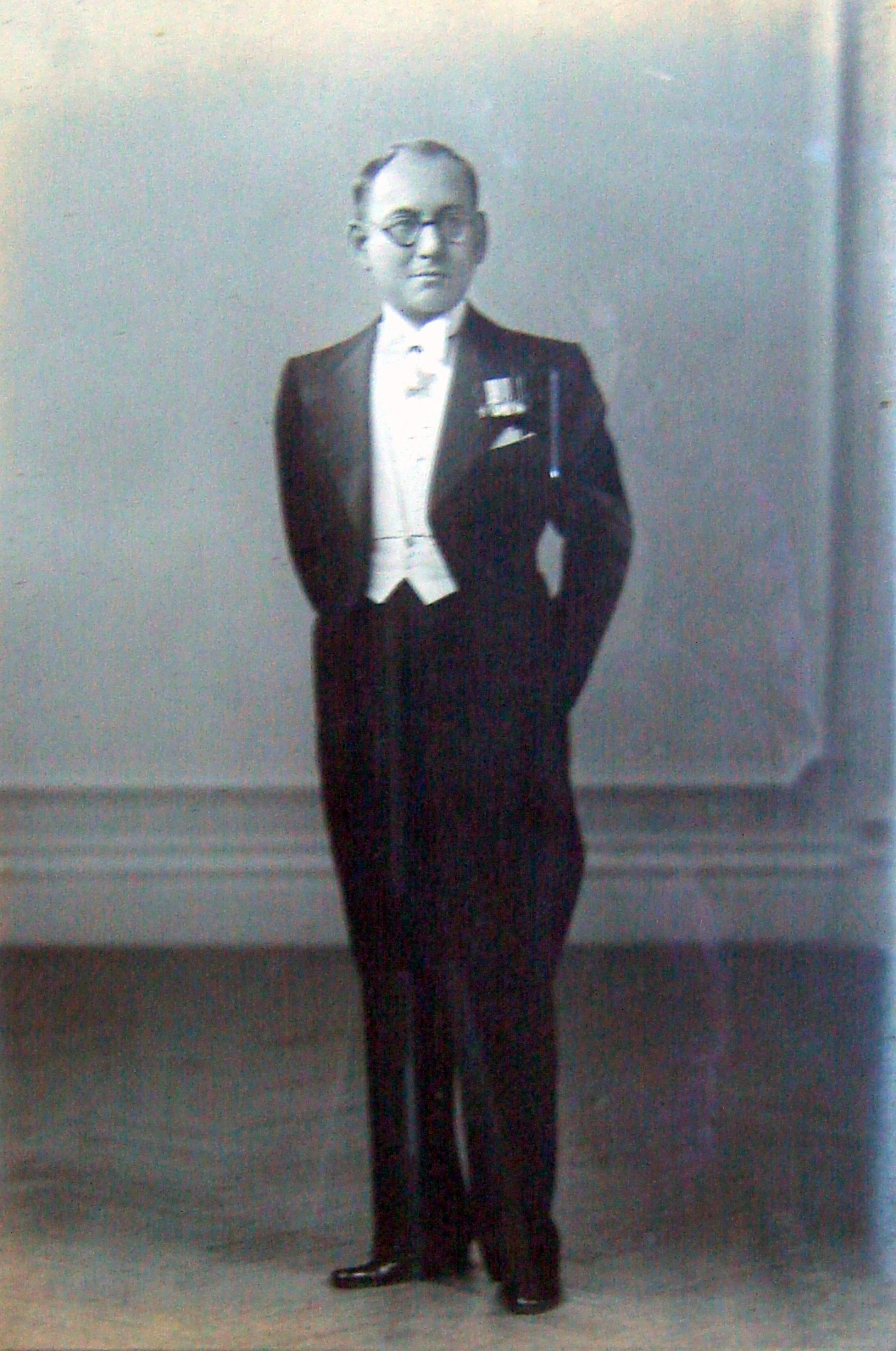
Bada Kaji Manik Lal Rajbhandari, December 1927

== Education ==
Bada Kaji Manik lal Rajbhandari was the first graduate of Nepal. He obtained his Degree in Bachelor of Arts from the St. Xavier's College, Kolkata, affiliated with the University of Calcutta (CU), in 1906.

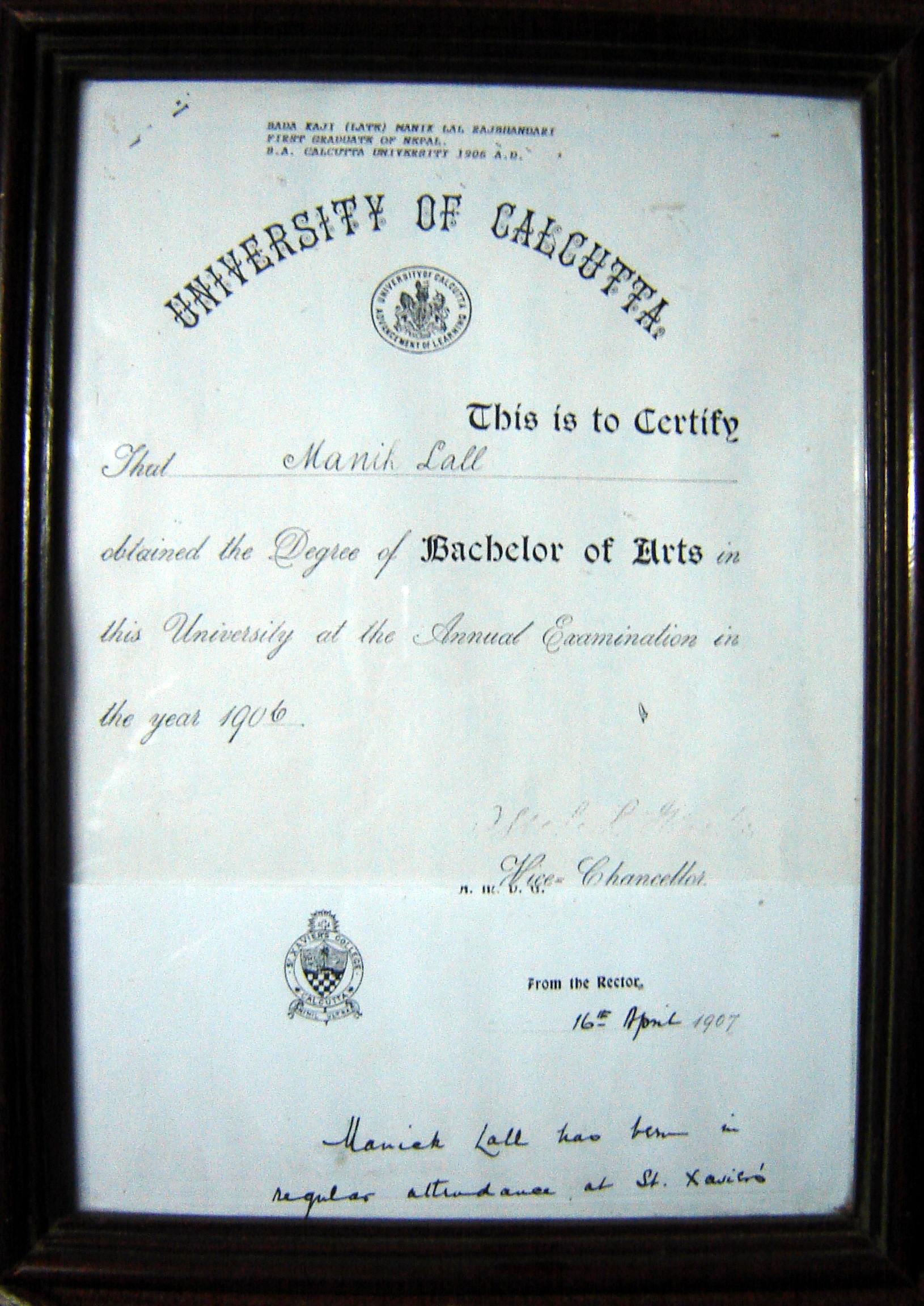
First Graduate of Nepal, Bada Kaji Manik Lal Rajbhandari's Bachelor's Certificate, 1906.

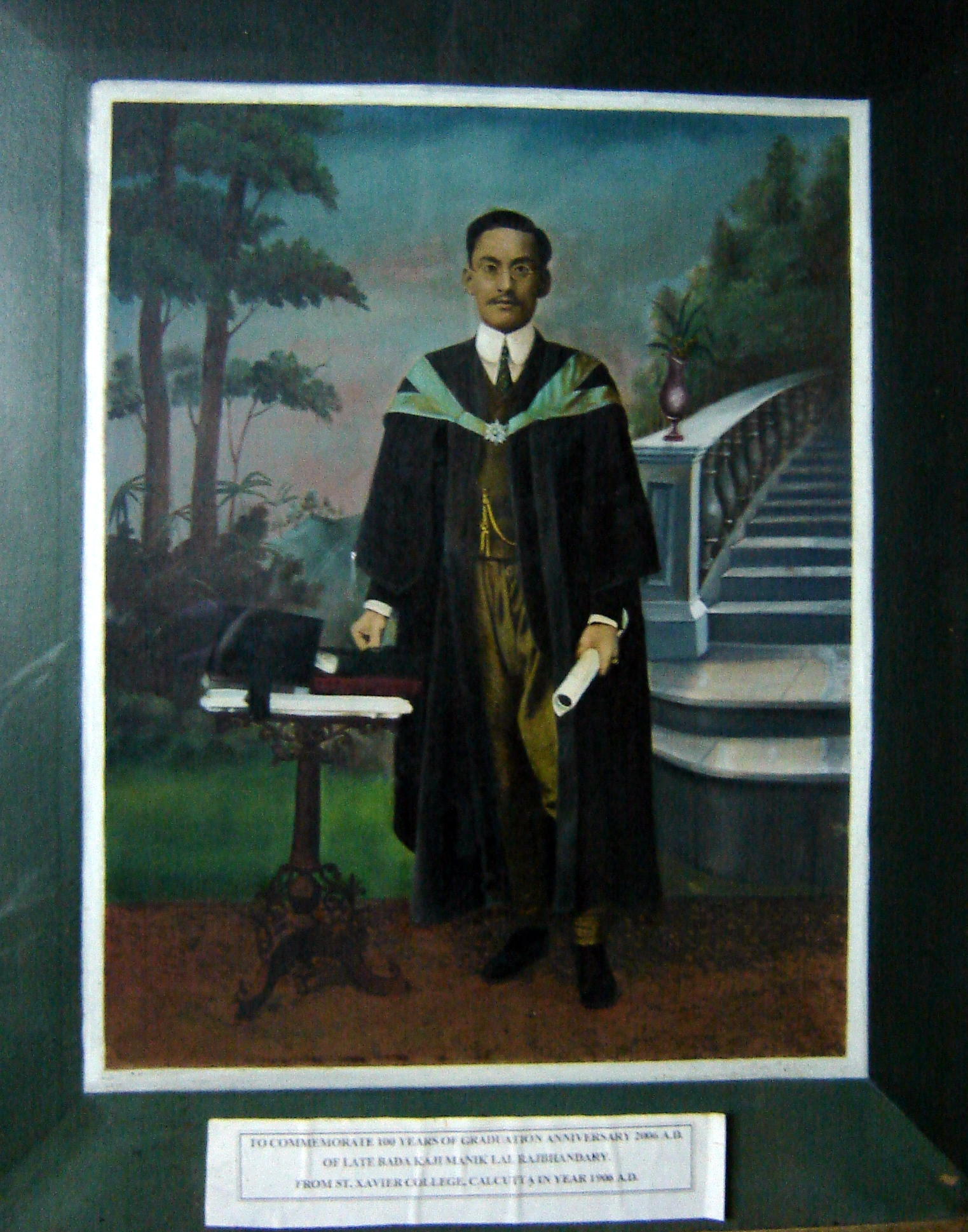
First Graduate of Nepal, Bada Kaji Manik Lal Rajbhandari, 1906

== Career ==
- Minister for Public Works, Communication, Law and Parliamentary Affairs, Health, and Local Self Governance in the Advisory Council Government, August 1952 – June 1953.
- First Secretary of Nepal Embassy in London/Great Britain, at the time of Shova Jung, 1945.
- He was a philatelist and numismatist.
- Councilor in the Royal Councilor's Government of 1952–53.

== Gallery ==
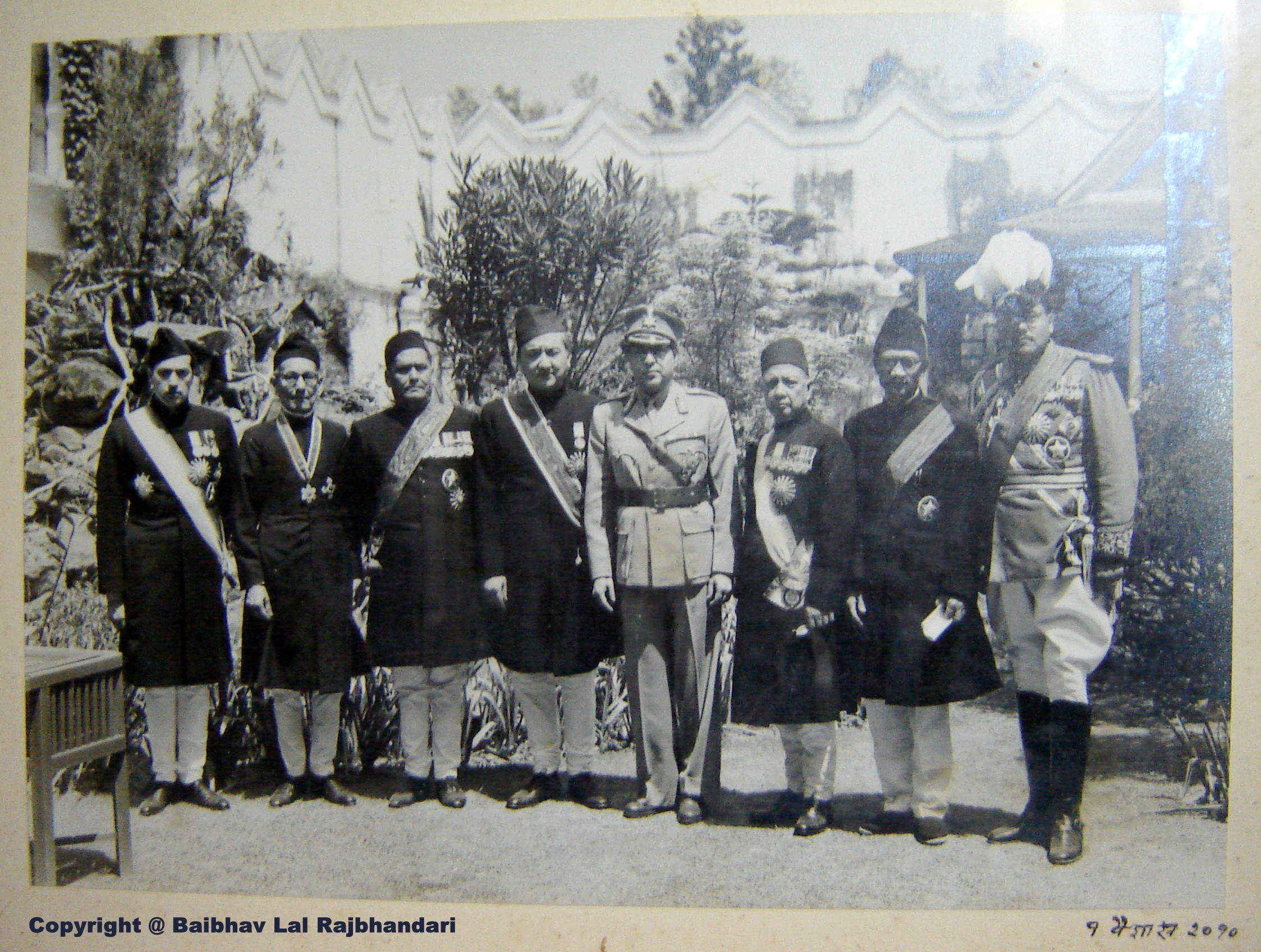
Royal Councilor's Government, 1952–53. Bada Kaji Manik Lal Rajbhandari second from left and King Tribhuvan fifth from left.

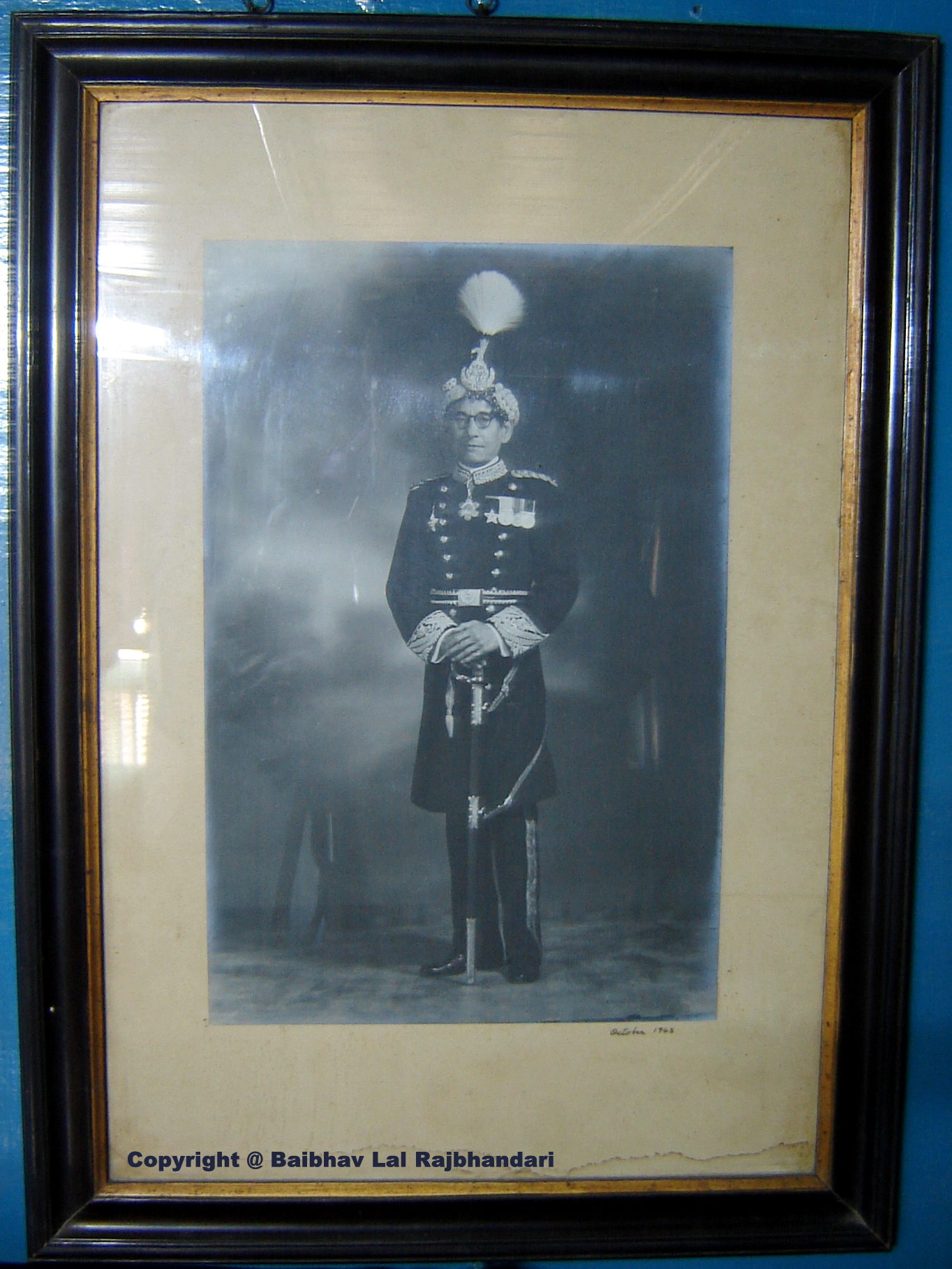
Bada Kaji Manik Lal Rajbhandari in uniform

== Personal life ==
He is believed to be amongst the first to own a car in Nepal, an Austin. He brought one of the first cinema projectors, wireless gramophones, typewriters, microscopes, and telescopes to Nepal. His residence is located in Kwalkhu, Mangalbazar in the Lalitpur district of Kathmandu Valley. It was later named The Graduate Centenary House, in honour of his graduation from St. Xaviers College, Calcutta. The house since has been the residence for his family members.

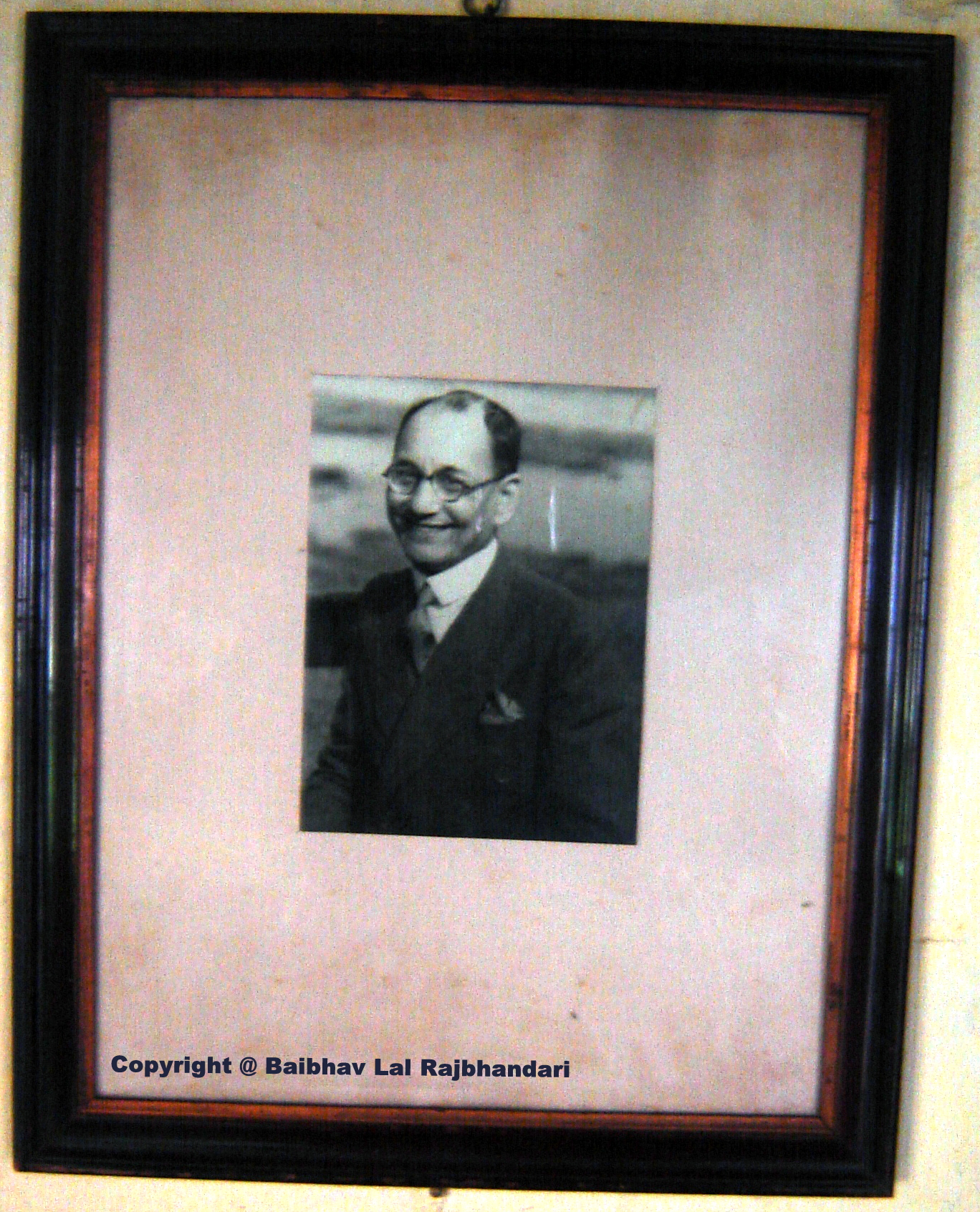
Bada Kaji Manik Lal Rajbhandari

== Titles ==
- Bada Kaji
- Bada Hakim
- Sardar
- Minister

== Honors ==
- Gorkha Dakshina Bahu First
