= Saifuddin Ahmed (academic) =

Political communication scholar and researcher

- Born: India
- Known for: Illusory truth effect in synthetic media; inhibition effect in political participation
- Awards: Nanyang Research Award (2025)

Academic background
- Education: University of California, Davis (Ph.D., 2018)

Academic work
- Discipline: Communication studies
- Sub-discipline: Misinformation, deepfakes, Political communication
- Institutions: Nanyang Technological University
- Website: dr.ntu.edu.sg/items/bfb5112a-2f3f-49d2-8a08-3552ff71fcb1

Saifuddin Ahmed (commonly known as Saif Ahmed) is a political communication scholar and associate professor at the Wee Kim Wee School of Communication and Information, Nanyang Technological University (NTU) in Singapore. He is best known for demonstrating that the illusory truth effect extends to synthetic media, that is, repeated social media exposure increases the perceived credibility of deepfakes regardless of prior skepticism, and for identifying the inhibition effect whereby privacy concerns paradoxically suppress online political participation among already-engaged users.

Ahmed has contributed to international policy discussions on disinformation through the United Nations Institute for Disarmament Research (UNIDIR). He has secured external funding from Temasek and Singapore's Ministry of Education Academic Research Fund (AcRF) totaling over S$900,000, supporting research on deepfakes, extremism, and public opinion on artificial intelligence. He has published over 75 peer-reviewed articles in journals including New Media & Society, Computers in Human Behavior, and Scientific Reports. He has been listed among the world's top 2% scientists by Stanford University and Elsevier for three consecutive years (2023–2025). In 2025, Ahmed received the Nanyang Research Award, an annual prize awarded by Nanyang Technological University for research excellence.

== Career ==
Ahmed received his Ph.D. in Communication from the University of California, Davis in 2018 and joined the Wee Kim Wee School of Communication and Information at NTU Singapore the same year, rising to associate professor in 2025. Since joining NTU, he has developed influential research programmes that examine how citizens engage with political misinformation and deepfakes, while critically interrogating the disruptive role of social media in democratic life.

== Research ==
Ahmed's research falls into two principal areas: the psychology of deepfake perception and digital misinformation, and the relationship between social media use and political participation.

=== Deepfakes and misinformation ===
Ahmed is among the first communication scholars to systematically examine how ordinary audiences perceive, process, and inadvertently spread deepfake media. An early cross-cultural study established that political interest and social network size, rather than media literacy alone, predict who shares deepfakes, documenting a third-person perception bias in which individuals consistently believe they are less susceptible to deepfakes than others. Contrary to prevailing assumptions that media literacy and cognitive ability protect audiences from disinformation, Ahmed found that cognitive ability alone is insufficient to inoculate individuals against deepfake-induced news scepticism, with social media news use moderating susceptibility.

A programme of cross-national work spanning eight countries extended the illusory truth effect to synthetic media, showing that repeated social media exposure increases the perceived credibility of viral deepfakes. A companion eight-country study, recognized by Scientific Reports as one of its top 100 papers of 2023 (out of 22,180 submissions), demonstrated that social media fatigue increases misinformation sharing, with the relationship conditioned by cognitive ability and dark personality traits such as narcissism. Separate research established that fear of missing out (FOMO) interacts with deficient self-regulation to drive deepfake sharing across multiple cultural contexts.

Ahmed has also examined the intersection of gender inequality and digital misinformation, finding that sexism and structural gender inequality, amplified by social media news use, significantly increase belief in misinformation targeting women politicians. Further work demonstrated that exposure to a deepfake depicting a government infrastructure failure substantially reduces trust in government, with implications for national security preparedness.

=== Social media, news, and political participation ===
Ahmed's second major research strand examines how social media news consumption shapes political engagement and exacerbates or attenuates existing social inequalities. Drawing on large-scale comparative data, he has documented that the relationship between internet use and political participation is not universal: press freedom, education level, and social network composition each moderate whether digital media narrows or widens existing participation gaps, with evidence from studies spanning over 100 countries.

Research on social network structure established that the diversity and size of one's social ties mediate the effect of incidental news exposure on political knowledge and engagement: politically diverse networks amplify knowledge gains, while homogeneous networks reinforce existing disparities among adolescents and young adults. A counterintuitive "inhibition effect" was identified whereby privacy concerns disrupt the otherwise positive relationship between social media use and online political participation, attenuating civic mobilization particularly among users who are already privacy-aware.

Cross-national analyses have consistently found that gender norms and structural inequality shape political participation gaps: social media news use does not equalize men's and women's political engagement, and in contexts of high gender inequality it may widen them. Additional work found that social media skepticism, distrust of platform information environments in particular, independently suppresses political participation, independently of partisan identity or political interest.

== Awards and recognition ==
Year	Award	Awarding body
2025	Nanyang Research Award	Nanyang Technological University — highest honor for research excellence
2023, 2024, 2025	World's Top 2% Scientists (Communication & Media Studies)	Stanford University and Elsevier
2023	Top 100 papers in Scientific Reports (out of 22,180 submissions)	Nature Portfolio
2023	Best Paper Award — ICA China Chapter	International Communication Association
2022	Best Paper Award — Political Communication Division	Association for Education in Journalism and Mass Communication (AEJMC)
2021	Best Paper Award — International Communication Division	AEJMC

== Media presence ==
Ahmed is frequently cited as an expert on disinformation, deepfakes, and social media in major international and regional media. He has been quoted or covered by The New York Times, Newsweek, Channel NewsAsia, The Straits Times, Lianhe Zaobao, The Hindu Business Line, Salon, The Wire, CounterPunch, Business Standard, and Japan Today.

== Selected publications ==
- Ahmed, S., Masood, M., & Bee, A.W.T. (2025). "Believing the Untrue: How Social Media, Sexism, and Structural Gender Inequality Influence Misinformation about Women Politicians." Journalism & Mass Communication Quarterly. doi:10.1177/10776990251313756
- Ahmed, S., Masood, M., Bee, A.W.T., & Ichikawa, K. (2025). "False Failures, Real Distrust: The Impact of an Infrastructure Failure Deepfake on Government Trust." Frontiers in Psychology. doi:10.3389/fpsyg.2025.1574840
- Ahmed, S., Bee, A.W.T., Ng, S.W.T., & Masood, M. (2024). "Social media news use amplifies the illusory truth effects of viral deepfakes: A cross-national study of eight countries." Journal of Broadcasting & Electronic Media. doi:10.1080/08838151.2024.2410783
- Ahmed, S., Bee, A.W.T., Masood, M., & Wei, T.H. (2024). "You have been blocked: Exploring the psychological, personality, and cognitive traits of blocking misinformation sources on social media." Telematics and Informatics, 89, 102123. doi:10.1016/j.tele.2024.102123
- Ahmed, S., Gil-Lopez, T., Lee, S., & Masood, M. (2024). "Pathways from Incidental News Exposure to Political Knowledge: Examining Paradoxical Effects of Political Discussion on Social Media with Strong and Weak Ties." New Media & Society. doi:10.1177/14614448241287763
- Ahmed, S., & Rasul, M.E. (2023). "Examining the association between social media fatigue, cognitive ability, narcissism and misinformation sharing: cross-national evidence from eight countries." Scientific Reports, 13(1), 15416. doi:10.1038/s41598-023-42614-z
- Ahmed, S. (2023). "Navigating the maze: Deepfakes, cognitive ability, and social media news skepticism." New Media & Society, 25(5), 1108–1129. doi:10.1177/14614448211019198
- Ahmed, S., & Lee, S. (2023). "The inhibition effect: Privacy concerns disrupt the positive effects of social media use on online political participation." New Media & Society. doi:10.1177/14614448231173328
- Ahmed, S. (2021). "Who inadvertently shares deepfakes? Analyzing the role of political interest, cognitive ability, and social network size." Telematics and Informatics, 57, 101508. doi:10.1016/j.tele.2020.101508
- Ahmed, S., & Cho, J. (2019). "The Internet and political (in)equality in the Arab world: A multi-country study of the relationship between Internet news use, press freedom, and protest participation." New Media & Society, 21(5), 1065–1084.
