= Ramkot, Nepal =

Ramkot रामकोट
- Village of Nagarjun Municipality
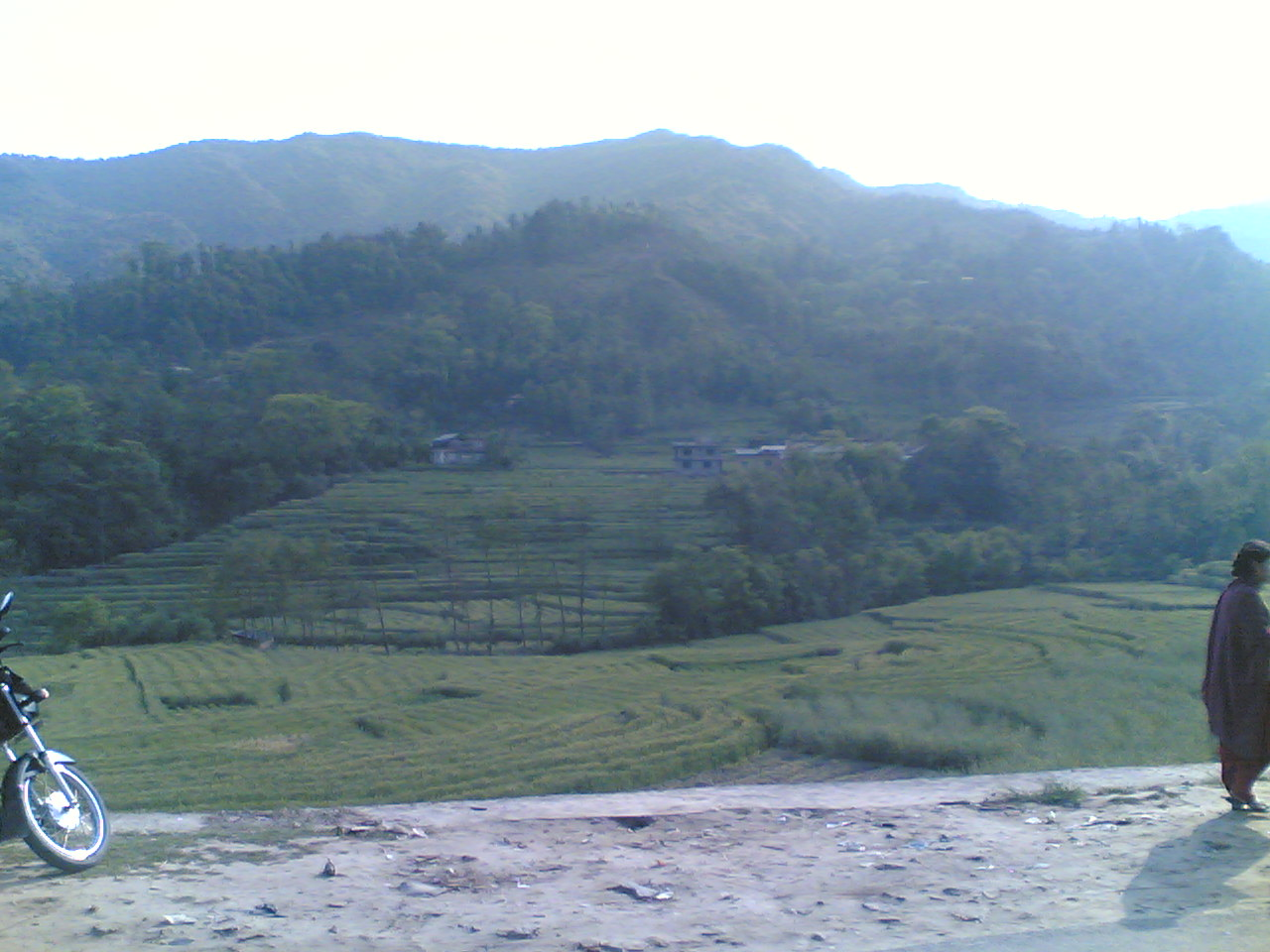
- Paddy field in Ramkot below a hill

- Location in Nepal
- Coordinates: 27°43′N 85°15′E
- Country: Nepal
- Province: Province No. 3
- District: Kathmandu

Population (2011)
  - Total: 8,759
- 50.2% males (4,399) and 49.8% females (4,360)
- Time zone: UTC+5:45 (Nepal Time)

Ramkot is a village of the Nagarjun Municipality, Bagmati Province, Nepal (formerly part of the village development committee). The 2011 Nepal census recorded that Ramkot had a population of 6,303 people in 1,427 independent households.

Ramkot is named after the Hindu deity, Rama. A local legend says that Rama spent a few days in Ramkot during exile and left behind a piece of his clothing, while another describes how Rama constructed a building to store his weapons, named Kot (house of keeping weapons). Sitapaila, an adjacent village, is named after Sita, Rama's wife, who is said to have visited the settlement.

== Location ==
=== Dandapauwa ===
Dandapauwa (डाँडापौवा) (27°43′N 85°16′E) is a ward of Ramkot that borders Taufical, Fasku, Puldol, JayantiGaun, and Gotamthok. The Manamati and Kolpini rivers flow through Dandapauwa, part of the district of Kathmandu.

== Demographics ==
Ramkot is a Puri/Giri village.

Major demographic groups in Dandapauwa include Sanyasi (puri),Newar, Brahmin, Chhetrie, and Tamang populations.

== Economy ==
Most of the population engage in agriculture so local tunnels are often built for farming. A grain factory, noodle factory, bitumen factory, and a pharmacy operate in the region. However, the tobacco factory was closed in 2013 due to extreme pollution emissions.

Small-scale companies can also be found. Financial companies include Kotasya Bhairab and Shyameshwor, named after local temples.

== Politics ==
Ramkot falls within the Kathmandu 9 parliamentary constituency. Since the 2017 national elections, the constituency has been represented by Krishna Gopal Shrestha of the Nepal Communist Party in the House of Representatives. Before the 2017 elections, the constituency was represented by Dhyan Govinda Ranjit of the Nepali Congress party, who was elected as a member of the 2nd Nepalese Constituent Assembly in the 2013 Nepalese Constituent Assembly election.
