= Rajopadhyaya =

Community of Newa Brahmins in Nepal

Rajopadhyaya (Newar: 𑐬𑐵𑐖𑑀𑐥𑐵𑐢𑑂𑐫𑐵𑐫; Nepali: राजोपाध्याय), also called Newa Brahmin (Newar: 𑐣𑐾𑐰𑐵𑑅 𑐧𑐬𑑂𑐴𑑂𑐩𑐸; Nepali: नेवार ब्राह्मण), is the main division of the Newar Brahmins in Nepal. The Rajopadhyayas claim to have originated in Kannauj, or modern day Kannauj in Uttar Pradesh, India. Kannauj is a city with a prestigious history from where the Newar Brahmins claim to come.

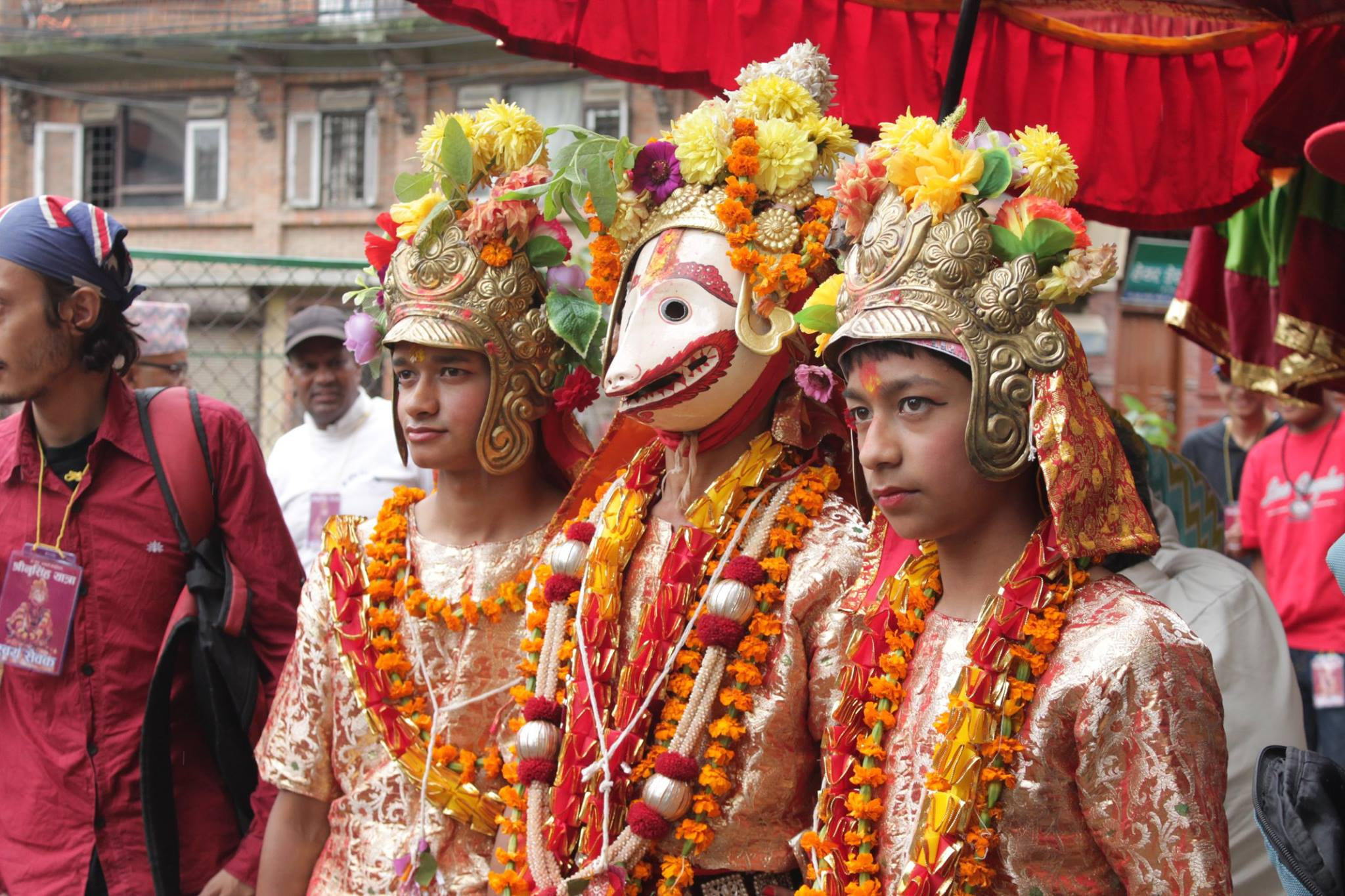
Rajopadhyayas wearing the mask and costumes of deities during the Narasimha Jatra.

In Sanskrit, Rājopādhyāya or Rāj-Upādhyāya literally means 'royal teacher' or 'guru' (Sanskrit: राज = royal + उपाध्याय = guru). Rajopadhyayas, also colloquially called Deva Brāhman or Dyabājyā (God-Grandfather) or Barmu (Brahmin), were the royal gurus and purohits of the Malla kings and their Hindu aristocracy (present day Chatharīyās). Today, the Rajopadhyaya Brahmans are the domestic priests of the high-caste Hindu Newars, principally the Chatharīyas and Śreşțhas, and also certain segments of clean-caste Hindu Newar groups (most notably Bhaktapur Jyapus) of the Kathmandu Valley. In theory, the Chatharīyas of the Kathmandu Valley do not call on other Brahmin groups, as Rajopadhyayas alone serve as their historical purohits and perform all their life-cycle Sanskara rituals, including bestowing their Gayatri Mantra verse and the sacred thread ('janai') in the Upanayana ceremony. This is opposed to all other clean-caste Newar groups who call upon a Buddhist Vajrāchārya as their family priest to conduct all life-cycle ceremonies.

Rajopadhyayas are an endogamous Brahmin group descended from Kānyakubja Brahmins of Kannauj who immigrated to Kathmandu Valley from 13th to 16th century CE. They are divided among the three cities of Kathmandu, Bhaktapur and Lalitpur into strictly exogamous clans, having three gotras: Gārgya of Lalitpur, Bharadwaja of Bhaktapur, and Kaushik of Kathmandu, all belonging to the Mādhyamdina school of the Shukla Yajurveda. Their holy language is Sanskrit, and they are all well-versed in Newar. As the chief Brahmin group among Newars and as the chief preceptor of the Vedic as well as Tantric knowledge, Rajopadhyayas were placed at the top of the Nepalese caste system and possess immense social prestige and power, especially among the Hindu Newars.

== Priesthood ==
Rajopadhyayas also serve as the Vedic and Tantric temple priests of some of the most important temples of the Vaishnav and Shaivism sects, including Krishna Mandir and the four cardinal Vishnu temples of Kathmandu Valley: Changu Narayan, Sesh Narayan/Budhanilkantha, Bishankhu Narayan, and Ichanghu Narayana, as well as the Kumbheshwor. In most other major temples with explicit Shakta and Tantra functions which require blood sacrifice and the use of alcohol, Rajopadhyayas are absent, and the priestly functions are performed by the Chatharīyā/Kşatrīya-status Karmāchāryas. Most of the other Shakta or Ganesh shrines are maintained by the farmer Jyapus or by unclean-castes like the Jogi/Kapali or the untouchable Chyāmaha/Déula. The lone exception to the rule of Rajopadhayayas not being part of the Shakta cult is Bhaktapur's Taleju Bhawani temple, the ista-devi of Malla kings, where they serve as the chief priests. In addition to their duties as purohits to Chatharīyās and Śresțhas, Rajopadhyayas also serve as hereditary pujāris of the following temples:

- Changu Narayan (a UNESCO World Heritage Site) in Bhaktapur
- Pasupatinath (another UNESCO World Heritage Site: Rajopadhyayas were the chief priests of the temple in the past in Kathmandu
- Taleju temples in Kathmandu, Bhaktapur and Lalitpur
- Dui Maju temple in Kathmandu and Bhaktapur
- Kumbheshwor Mahadev in Lalitpur
- Nyatapola (Siddhilaxmi) Temple in Bhaktapur
- Krishna Temple in Patan Durbar Square
- Sano Pashupati in Kathmandu Durbar Square
- Ichangu Narayan Temple in Halchowk
- Shesh Narayan in Farping
- Hanuman Agam temple in Kathmandu Durbar Square
- Laxmi Narayan temple in Changu Narayan complex

== Popular Rajopadhyaya Names ==
Rajopadhyayas popularly use the following surnames: Rajopadhyaya, Sharma, Upadhyaya, Acharya, among others. Some popular Rajopadhyaya names from history and popular culture include:

- Sudarshan Brahman (a mythical Brahmin who was slain at Changu Narayan)
- Gaya Juju (Gayo Bājé) of Sulimha, Patan
- Vishvanath Upādhyāya of Valimha, Patan
- Sahasra Shivānanda of Indrachowk
- Pundit Vamshi Dharānanda Rajopadhyaya of Changu Narayan
- Newa Priest and scholar Basav Juju Rajopadhyaya from Kathmandu is working to preserve and promote newa culture and ritual tradition around the United States of America.
- Narendra Rajopadhyay / Valchandra Rajopadhyay of Makhan Mahadev Temple OR known as Mandreshwor Mahadev / Sano Pashupatinath in Makhan Tole situated in Kathmandu, Nepal who is a priest that does regular work in traditional puja and so on.
- Rajesh Rajopadhyay who is the main priest of Makhan Mahadev Temple at Makhan Tole, Kathmandu, Nepal.

== See also ==
- Bahun
- Nepalese caste system
- Newar caste system
- Shaivism
- Shakta
- Gotras
