= Kathmandu 9 =

Parliamentary constituency in Nepal

- Parliamentary constituency for the House of Representatives
- Kathmandu 9 in Bagmati Province

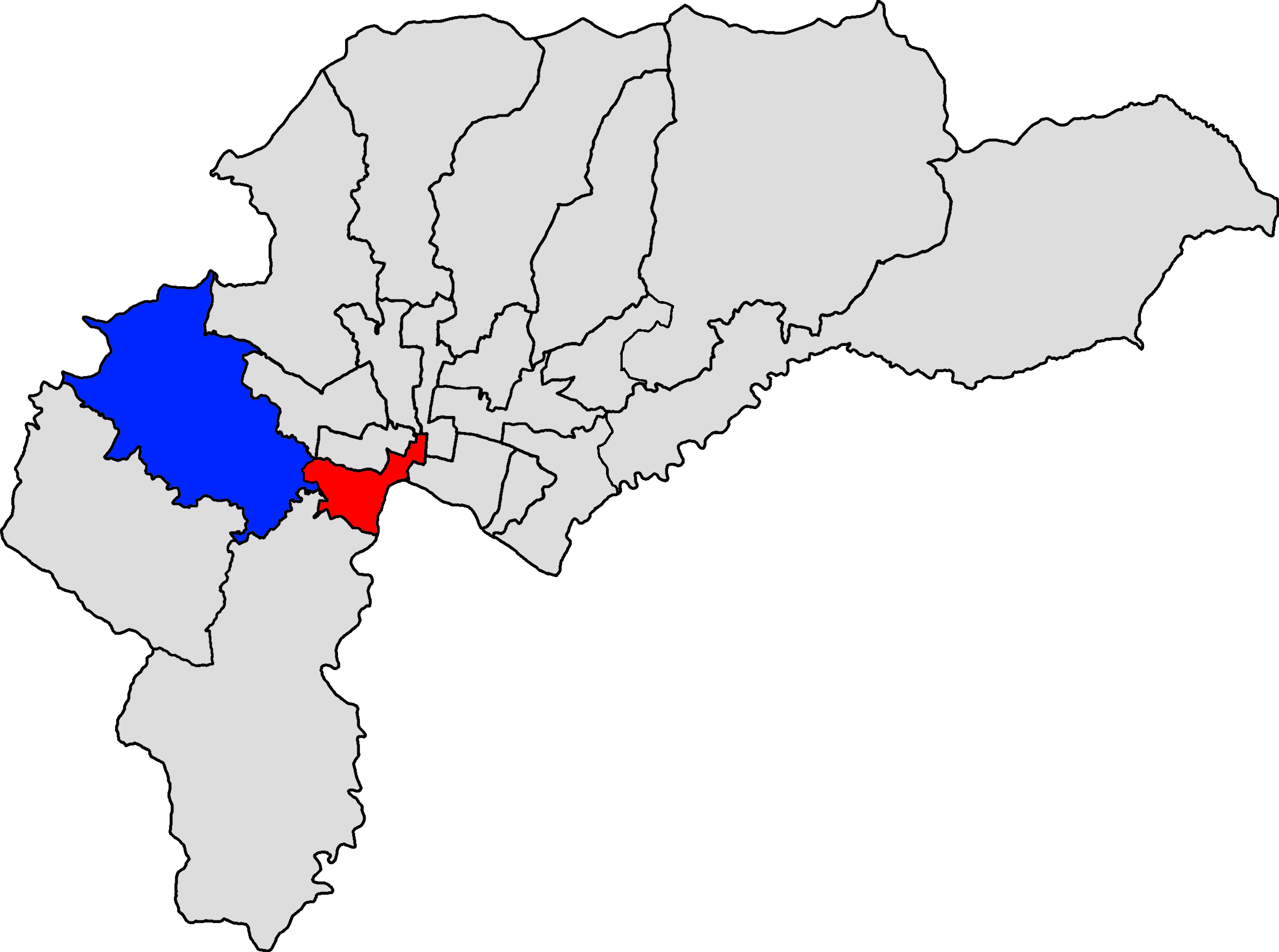
- Assembly segment Kathmandu 9(A) (red) and Kathmandu 9(B) (blue) within Kathmandu District
- Province: Bagmati Province
- District: Kathmandu District
- Electorate: 78,495
- Major settlements: Balkhu; Kalanki; Kuleshwor; Naikap; Soltimode; Sitapaila; Tankeshwar; Teku; Thankot; Tripureshwor

Current constituency
- Created: 2008
- Party: RSP
- Member of Parliament: Dol Prasad Aryal
- Municipalities: Chandragiri Municipality (some wards); Kathmandu Metropolitan City (some wards); Nagarjun Municipality (some wards)

Kathmandu 9 is one of 10 parliamentary constituencies of Kathmandu District in Nepal. This constituency came into existence on the Constituency Delimitation Commission (CDC) report submitted on 31 August 2017.

== Incorporated areas ==
Kathmandu 9 parliamentary constituency consists of wards 12, 14, 21 and 22 of Kathmandu Metropolitan City, wards 6, 7, 8, 9 and 10 of Nagarjun Municipality and wards 1, 12, 13, 14 and 15 of Chandragiri Municipality.

== Assembly segments ==
It encompasses the following Bagmati Province Provincial Assembly segment

- Kathmandu 9(A)
- Kathmandu 9(B)

== Members of Parliament ==
=== Parliament/Constituent Assembly ===
Election	Member	Party
2008	Dhyan Govinda Ranjit	Nepali Congress
2017	Krishna Gopal Shrestha	CPN (Unified Marxist–Leninist)
May 2018	Krishna Gopal Shrestha	Nepal Communist Party
March 2021	Krishna Gopal Shrestha	CPN (Unified Marxist–Leninist)
2022	Krishna Gopal Shrestha	CPN (Unified Marxist–Leninist)
2026	Dol Prasad Aryal	Rastriya Swatantra Party

=== Provincial Assembly ===
==== 9(A) ====
Election	Member	Party
2017	Ajaya Kranti Shakya	CPN (Unified Marxist–Leninist)
May 2018	Ajaya Kranti Shakya	Nepal Communist Party

==== 9(B) ====
Election	Member	Party
2017	Keshav Prasad Pokharel	CPN (Unified Marxist–Leninist)
May 2018	Keshav Prasad Pokharel	Nepal Communist Party

== Election results ==
=== Election in the 2020s ===
==== 2026 general election ====
Candidate	Party	Votes	%
Dol Prasad Aryal	Rastriya Swatantra Party	35,093	69.26
Nanu Maiya Bastola	Nepali Congress	5,460	10.78
Ajay Kranti Shakya	CPN (UML)	4,580	9.04
Dil Kumar Karki	Rastriya Prajatantra Party	1,457	2.88
Rameshwor Shrestha	Ujyaalo Nepal Party	1,426	2.81
Radha Krishna Maharjan	Nepali Communist Party	1,328	2.62
Shanta Maharjan	Nepal Workers Peasants Party	443	0.87
Others		883	1.74
Total		50,670	100.00
Valid votes		50,670	98.19
Invalid/blank votes		933	1.81
Total votes		51,603	100.00
Registered voters/turnout		78,495	65.74
Majority		29,633	
Rastriya Swatantra Party gain			

==== 2022 general election ====
Candidate	Party	Votes	%
Krishna Gopal Shrestha	CPN (UML)	11,956	28.12
Tek Bahadur Pokharel	Rastriya Swatantra Party	10,961	25.78
Kalpana Dhamala	CPN (Maoist Centre)	6,402	15.06
Devendra Pradhan	Rastriya Prajatantra Party	4,785	11.25
Milan Pandey	Sajha Party Nepal	2,327	5.47
Eras Shrestha	Hamro Nepali Party	1,586	3.73
Suman Maharjan	Nepal Workers Peasants Party	1,552	3.65
Others		2,948	6.93
Total		42,517	100.00
Majority		995	
CPN (UML) hold			

=== Election in the 2010s ===
==== 2017 legislative elections ====
Party	Candidate	Votes
CPN (Unified Marxist–Leninist)	Krishna Gopal Shrestha	22,852
Nepali Congress	Dhyan Govinda Ranjit	14,802
Bibeksheel Sajha Party	Milan Pandey	4,946
Others		2,475
Invalid votes		1,154
Result	CPN (UML) gain	
Source: Election Commission

==== 2017 Nepalese provincial elections ====
===== Kathmandu 9(A) =====
Party	Candidate	Votes
CPN (Unified Marxist–Leninist)	Ajaya Kranti Shakya	9,531
Nepali Congress	Indraman Tuladhar	7,193
Bibeksheel Sajha Party	Chakrapani Neupane	3,369
Others		1,494
Invalid votes		498
Result	CPN (UML) gain	
Source: Election Commission

===== Kathmandu 9(B) =====
Party	Candidate	Votes
CPN (Unified Marxist–Leninist)	Keshav Prasad Pokharel	12,156
Nepali Congress	Dharma Raj Gautam	9,110
Bibeksheel Sajha Party	Surendra Bahadur Ranabhaat	1,384
Others		1,034
Invalid votes		452
Result	CPN (UML) gain	
Source: Election Commission

==== 2013 Constituent Assembly election ====
Party	Candidate	Votes
Nepali Congress	Dhyan Govinda Ranjit	14,483
CPN (Unified Marxist–Leninist)	Krishna Gopal Shrestha	13,100
UCPN (Maoist)	Devendra Paudel	6,669
Rastriya Prajatantra Party Nepal	Devendra Pradhan	4,490
Federal Socialist Party, Nepal	Radha Krishna Mainali	1,547
Others		3,417
Result	Congress hold	
Source: Election Commission

=== Election in the 2000s ===
==== 2008 Constituent Assembly election ====
Party	Candidate	Votes
Nepali Congress	Dhyan Govinda Ranjit	12,501
UCPN (Maoist)	Maila Lama Tamang	12,292
CPN (Unified Marxist–Leninist)	Krishna Gopal Shrestha	12,194
Rastriya Prajatantra Party	Badri Raj Giri	1,110
Rastriya Prajatantra Party Nepal	Rukmani Basnet	1,083
Others		2,428
Invalid votes		1,787
Result	Congress gain	
Source: Election Commission

== See also ==
- List of parliamentary constituencies of Nepal
