= Caste system in Nepal =

Nepalese traditional social stratification system

The Nepalese caste system is the traditional system of social stratification of Nepal. The Nepalese caste system broadly borrows the classical Hindu Chaturvarnashram model, consisting of four broad social classes or varna: Brahmin, Kshatriya, Vaishya, Sudra.

The caste system defines social classes by a number of hierarchical endogamous groups often termed jaat. This custom was traditionally only prevalent in the three Indo Aryan societies of the Khas, Madhesi, and Newars. However, since the unification of Nepal in the 18th century, Nepal's various non-Hindu ethnic nationalities and tribes, previously called "Matwalis" (alcohol-drinkers) and now termed as "Adivasi/Janajati" (indigenous/nationalities), have been incorporated within the caste hierarchy to varying degrees of success. Despite the forceful integration by the state into the pan-Hindu social structure, the traditionally non-Hindu groups and tribes do not necessarily adhere to the customs and practices of the caste system.

The Government of Nepal legally abolished and criminalized any caste-based discrimination, including "untouchability" (the ostracism of a specific caste) - in 1963. With Nepal's step towards freedom and equality, Nepal, previously ruled by a Hindu monarchy, was a Hindu nation which has now become a secular state. On 28 May 2008, it was declared a republic, ending the period of the Hindu kingdom of Nepal.

== History ==
The ancient tribes living around the northern territory of modern Nepal seem to have been less influenced by the fourfold Varna system of Hinduism. Instead, nature worship, shamanism and ancestor worship was more common in sync with Tibetan spirituality among the Sino-Tibetan groups. Even Khas/Parbatiyas who are today overwhelmingly consolidated into the four Varna structure, have been following Masto tradition since ancient times whereby Masta tutelary deities known as bange-masta, bahiramasta, thado-masta, bahra-masta, athahra-masta are invoked and worshipped. This form of Masto worship among the Khasas is apparently not related to any Vedic scriptures and tradition of the Gangetic plains of India, and seems more closer to pre-Buddhist Shamanistic Bon practice of Tibet.

The earliest detailed record of the caste system in Nepal has been found in Kathmandu Valley from the 5th century CE during the Licchavi period (400-750 CE) with mentions of the presence of Brahmans (Vedic priests) and Chandala (untouchables). The existing caste structure as introduced by the Lichhavis was later fundamentally restructured during the reign of King Jayasthiti Malla (1380-1394). This restructuring was a result of over a millennia of newer Aryan immigrants from the plains since the time of the Lichchavis. Series of Aryan migration to Kathmandu led to increased population and formation of a complex urban and caste-based society. Among them, most notable migration was the advent of later Malla and Chathariya/Kshatriya and their Maithil Brahmins and others like the Khadgis (butchers), Dobhi, among others, with conquest of Karnat kingdom in 1324 CE by Ghiyath al-Din Tughluq, the founder of the Tughlaq dynasty and Sultan of Delhi. Jayasthiti Malla's restructuring also converted celibate Buddhist monks to householder status and inside the hierarchic fold for the first time to form the caste of Vajracharya and Shakya. It also solidified the supremacy of Kanyakubja Brahmin descendants like the Rajopadhyaya Brahmins over other priests like Maithil Brahmins. Karmacharyas and Joshis were all-together stripped off their Brahmin status by these new and arguably more well-read Brahmins, and assimilated them in the Kshatriya/Chathariya. The restructuring also yielded power to newly formed Malla aristocracy of the Chathariya Shrestha who formed the new powerful aristocratic caste of the Malla kingdom. Hence, the present Newar society's foundation firmly stands on this restructuring by Malla as Newar society continues to comprise the 4 varna and 64 different caste groups which were hierarchically allotted in Jayasthiti Malla's time according to the classical and religious Hindu scriptures like the Manusmriti. Gorkha king of the Chaubisi principality, Ram Shah (1609-1636) is noted to have introduced some rules and regulations about relations between different groups of people in the Gorkha kingdom too. As the Shah rulers conquered more territories and people, the concept of caste hierarchy more firmly applied as an organizing principle to consolidate diverse people under their authority. In 1854, early in the period of Rana rule, a National Legal Code (Muluki Ain) was proclaimed that laid out detailed codes for inter-caste behavior and specified punishments for their infringement.

== Traditional caste system ==
Although caste or tribe based hierarchy has been a hallmark for all ethnicities of Nepal, only three societies traditionally were part of the four Varna concept of social division and hierarchy. These societies/ethnicities were: Khas/Parbatiya and Newars in the hills and Madhesis in the plains.

=== Caste-origin Hill Hindu groups/Khas ===
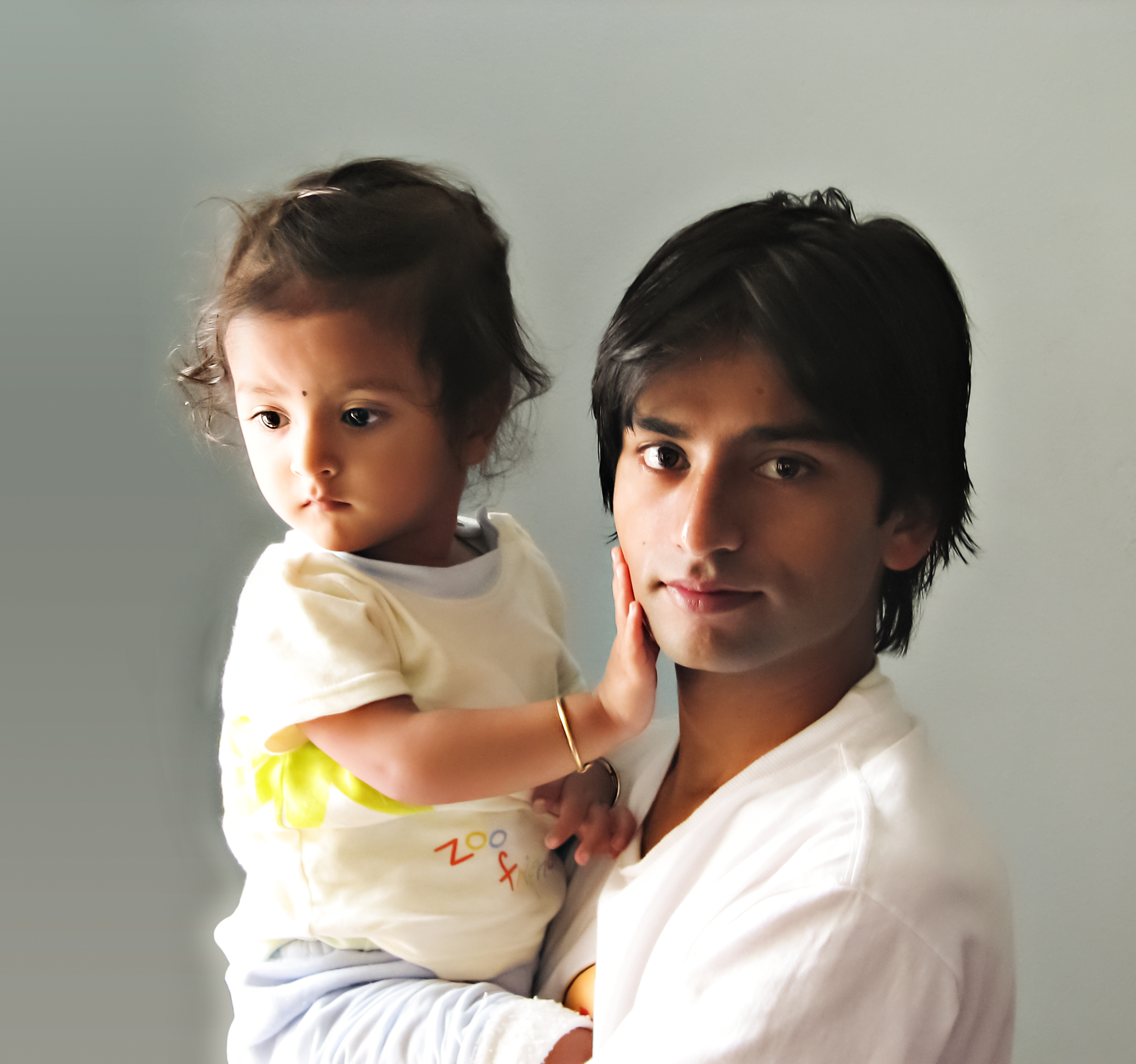
Members of Khas community

The social structure of caste-origin Hill Hindu or Khas groups is simple compared to the other two societies, reflecting only three groups in hierarchy, with the distinct absence of the Vaishya and Shudra varnas. Much of the previously animist/tribal Khas population of the western Nepal region acquired the 'Chhetri' status in the 1850s with the proclamation by the Rana Prime Minister Jung Bahadur Rana, making Chhetris the most populous caste/tribe of Nepal. The mother tongue of these groups is Kumaoni, Nepali and its dialects like Baitadeli and Doteli. In 2001 the CBS recorded only nine groups in the caste-origin Hill Hindu groups.

Parbatiya/Khas	
Twice-born/Khas-Arya :	(Brahmin): Kanyakubja Bahun
	(Kshatriya): Chhetri, Thakuri
Renouncer :	Dashnami Sanyasi and Kanphata Yogi
Service-castes (previously Untouchable) :	Kami
	Damai
	Sarki
	Badi

=== Caste-origin Nepal Mandala groups/Newārs ===
The case of Newār is exceptional. This group presents a complicated social structure that not only reflects the model of four Hindu varna categories and the unclean castes outside of it, but it is also clearly divided among the upper and lower Buddhist castes. Currently, Newars are divided into groups of over 25 occupational caste categories who share a common language (mother-tongue) Nepal Bhasa or speak Nepali.

Newārs (Nepal Mandal)	
Twice-born Hindus:	(Brahmin): Kanyakubja Rajopadhyaya
	(Kshatriya): Chatharīya Srēstha
	(Vaishya): Pāñchtharīya Srēstha, other Srēstha etc.
Twice-born Buddhists:	Vajracharya/Shakya (priests and goldsmiths)
	Urāy (Tuladhars/Bania) (traders and craftsmen)
Other pure castes:	Maharjans/Jyapus (farmers)
	Hindu Tamrakar, Shilpakar, etc. (metal and wood workers, merchants)
	Hindu Halwai (confectioners)
	Kumhāh/Prajapati (potters and farmers)
	Ranjitkar (cloth-dyers)
	Tandukar (farmers)
	Manandhar/Sāyami/Teli (oil-pressers and brewers)
	Malakar/Mali (florists)
	Nau/Napit (barbers/nail-cutters)
	Balami (farmers from outskrits)
	Pahari/Nagarkoti (farmers from outskirts)
	Kau/Nakarmi (iron-smiths)
	Dali/Putuwar (carriers)
	Chhipā/Ranjitkar (dyers)
Service-castes (previously Unclean or Untouchable) :	Bha/Karanjit (funeral priests)
	Khadgi, Naye, Kasai (butchers and musicians)
	Jogi, Kapali, Darshandhari (descendants of Kanphata Yogi sect, tailors, musicians)
	Dhobi, Rajak, Sangat (washermen)
	Kulu, Dom/Dusādh (leather-workers)
	Dyala, Podé, Chyāmaha/Chamāhār (sweepers, fishermen)

=== Caste-origin Madhesh Hindu groups ===
The social structure of the caste-origin Madhesi Hindu groups is complex, reflecting four varna groups with distinct hierarchical structure within them. These various cultural groups belong to four distinct language groups: Maithili, Bajika, Bhojpuri, and Awadhi. In 2001 the CBS recorded 43 caste-origin Hindu groups in the Madhesh. Caste prejudice is far less prevalent in cities nowadays, although nothing has changed in rural regions. As a result of occupational changes, increased education, their own efforts to emulate the upper castes and consolidation of political power, urban Dalits in the Terai have moved up in status. The National Report says, "Over the last 15-20 years, six groups, namely kath baniya, Rajbhar, Dhanuk, Sudi, Kalwar and Teli have socially upgraded their status from the water unacceptable to the water acceptable community within the Tarai origin Hindu caste groups."

Madhesi Hindus	
Twice-born :	(Brahmin): Maithil Brahmin, Kanyakubja Brahmin
	(Kshatriya): Rajput, Kayastha
	(Vaishya): Baniya (Marwari)
Other pure castes :	Yadav (Farmers/past Kshatriya)
	Kushwaha/Koeri (Farmers/ past Kshatriya)
	Halwai (Confectioners)
	Sunar (Goldsmiths)
	Lohar (Iron-smiths)
	Kumhar (Potters)
	Kurmi (Farmers)
	Māllāh (Fishermen)
	Kewat (Fisherman)
	Mali (Florists)
	Bhumihar (farmer)
Service-castes (previously Unclean or Untouchable) :	Kalwar (Alcohol brewers/merchants)
	Teli (Oil-pressers)
	Kath Baniya (Wood, timber traders, and general business)
	Rajbhar (Boatmen, fishermen, and agricultural laborers)
	Hajam/Thakur (Barbers)
	Sudi (Brewers)
	Paswan, Dusadh (Basket-makers)
	Musahar (Labourers)
	Chamar, Harijan, Ram (Leather-workers)
	Dhobi (Washermen)
	Dhanuk, Dhankar, Dharikar, Behera, Mandal (Agricultural laborers / security work)
	Khatwe, Khatik, Khateek (Bamboo craft workers )
	Tatma, Tanti, Das Weavers (Textile-making)
	Bantar, Bantaar, Bangali, Banbasi (Agricultural laborers, minor forest produce collectors)
	Dom (Cremation service workers, bamboo basket makers)
	Chidimar (Bird hunters, manual laborers)
	Pasi (Pig-rearing, manual labor)

== Muluki Ain (1854) ==
The Nepali civil code Muluki Ain was commissioned by Jung Bahadur Rana after his European tour and enacted in 1854. It was rooted in traditional Hindu Law and codified social practices for several centuries in Nepal. The law also comprised Prāyaścitta (avoidance and removal of sin) and Ācāra (the customary law of different castes and communities).

It was an attempt to include the entire Hindu as well as non-Hindu population of Nepal of that time into a single hierarchic civic code from the perspective of the Khas rulers. Terai and Newar Brahmins and Kshatriyas were officially placed below their Khas equivalents. Similarly, serious limitations and oversights of this code include the complete exclusion of the large middle-ranking Terai groups. Most notable contradiction is the inclusion of previously non-Hindu tribes "Adivasi Janajati" groups, as well as non-Nepalis including Muslims and Europeans into the hierarchical fold.

Hierarchies of Major Caste/Ethnic Groups in Nepal according to Muluki Ain:

Caste Division	Caste and Ethnic Groups
"Tagadhari" (Wearers of the Holy Thread)	Khas – Brahmin, Thakuri, Chhetri; Newar – Brahmin and Chatharīya Srēstha; Terai – Brahmin (referred in the code as Indian/Desi Brahmin) (no mention of Terai Kshatriya groups)
"Namasinya Matwali" (Non-enslavable Alcohol Drinkers)	Newar - Hindu Panchthariya Srēsthas and Buddhists Gubhaju/Baré (Vajracharya/Shākya), Urāy (Tuladhar and others), Jyapu, Manandhar, and other smaller pure occupational castes. Gurkha clans - Gurung, Magar, Kirat (Rai and Limbu)
"Masinya Matwali" (Enslavable Alcohol Drinkers)	Tamang, Sherpa, Thakali, Chepang, Gharti or Bhujel, Hayu, Kumal, and Tharu.
"Pani Na Chalne Chhoichhito Haalnu Naparne" (Water-unacceptable but touchable)	Newar lower impure occupational castes – Bha, Kapāli, Khadgi/Kasaĩ, Dhobi, Kulu. Mlechha: Muslims and Europeans
"Pani Na Chalne Chhoichhito Haalnu Parne" (Water-unacceptable and untouchable)	Khas occupational castes – Kami, Sarki, Damai, Badi. Terai occupational castes – Dhobi, Halkhor, Chamar, Dushad, Dom, Musahars, etc. Newar lowest occupational castes – Dom, Podhya, Chyamaha/Chandala, etc.

The social values preached by the Muluki Ain, however, were providing restrictive, anachronic and out of step with the spirit of times. These values were seen as a potent instrument of Rana political repression. After the Rana regime, caste rules relating to food, drink and intercaste marriage were openly flouted but the Muluki Ain had not been abrogated. In 1963, Legal Code was replaced by New 1964 Legal Code. The legal recognition to caste and all the discriminatory laws made on the grounds of caste were ceased.

== The caste system today ==
The caste system is still intact today but the rules are not as rigid as they were in the past. In 1963, a law (New Muluki Ain-1963) was passed making it illegal to discriminate against other castes and mandated treating all castes to equally under the law. Education is free and open to all castes.

The caste system conjoints a structural class divide which persists, in which lower castes/ethnicities are generally socio-economically are not equal like those of higher castes/ethnicities. Recent research has also shown that when it comes to Nepali people's impressions of social change, "Poverty, Human Resources and Region" explain more of the variation than "Ethnicity, Caste or Religious belonging" – i.e. people's perception of their own social situation has more to do with geography and objective social class, than with their association with the groups that the state has based its internal social policy on.

Participation of Khas-Brahmins in the civil service is 41.3% in spite of its population size of 12.2%. The population of Newars (all castes) is around 5%, but its occupancy in the civil service is more than one-third (33.2%), although vast majority of this share comes from the minority upper-caste segments of the Chathariya and Panchthariya Shrestha Newars. Upper-caste Newars remain the most over-represented community in terms of socio-political access. The population of Khas-Chhetris constitutes 17.6% but its participation is mere 14.7%. If these major three communities (upper-caste Khas (Bahun & Chhetri) and upper-caste Newars (Shresthas) or the 'BCN' combine their shares in the Government of Nepal, civil service employment is 89.2% in 1991. Their dominance is reflected in education, administration and economical activities of the nation. Among those 73.8% in higher education belong to the BCN, 22.0% Janajatis and 2.9% Dalit.

They have become major decision makers in the bureaucracy of Nepal has become crystal clear. In terms of earning/income generation, Newars have the highest per capita income of Rs. 38,193. Khas Brahmins come next with an average income of Rs. 24,399, Adivasi Janajatis ranks third with an average income of Rs. 15,630, Dalit Rs. 12,114 and Muslim ranks the lowest, Rs.11,014' The democratic transitions also failed to be inclusive management and functioning governance mainly because government was unable to understand and articulate the spirit of all Nepalese people irrespective of their caste, gender, ethnicity, and religion.

In this process the left outs were oppressed class (Dalits), women, the poorest of the poor, powerless and the second class citizen and indigenous nationalities (Adivasi Janajatis). In Nepal, high castes dominate 91.2% among the prominent position in politics and bureaucracy. The Dalits who constitute 12.8 percent of the total population of the country have no representation in the higher echelons of power (Gurung, H. 2006). Similarly, the Janajati has 32.0% (excluding Newars) of the total population of the country, has representation of 7.1%. In terms of education, 88.0% of Khas Brahmins & Chhetris, and Newars have access to school, 12.0% have never been to school. More than fifty (52.0%) of Hill Dalits, 47.0% of the Tarai Dalits, 48.0% of the Muslims and 30 percent of the Hill Adivasi Janajatis have never been to school.(Census, 2001)

In recent times, following the overthrow of the Nepali monarchy and move towards a federal republic, ethnicity and caste have taken center stage – the indigenous peoples (Adivasi Janajati) who make up a third of the country having been guaranteed rights that have not yet been fulfilled. There is an observable reaction to this among certain Khas Brahmin and Chhetri groups, seeking to prevent group-based rights from becoming an important factor in the country that earlier had a political system associated with group-based discrimination. Certain outside analysts have suggested that "seeking a balance in approach requires addressing both specific indigenous historical injustices while creating a common citizenship for all marginalised citizens regardless of identity, which remains a particularly challenging issue for Nepal".

According to Professor Madhusudan Subedi, economic and political advancements have pushed the caste system to break its stagnancy and status quo. New divisions and differences have given rise to new antagonisms and social norms. Working-class persons in urban areas who must make a living by selling their labour power. Traditional caste barriers have been broken down as a result of such social mobility. In the rural context, the traditional subsistence agriculture system and age-old caste structure have significantly changed, and a relationship based on wage labour on land is being developed.

== See also ==
- Gender inequality in Nepal
- Ethnic groups in Nepal
- Newar caste system
- Caste system in India
