= Newar dance =

Traditional dance of Newar communities

Kartik Pyakhan, a Newar dance drama

Nyatamaru Ajima Pyakhan, a Newar masked dance performed at Kirtipur.

Newar Dance (Nepal bhasa:𑐥𑑂𑐫𑐵𑐏𑑃) consists of the whole array of dances that are traditionally performed by Newars, an ethnic group primarily residing in Kathmandu Valley and surrounding areas of Nepal.

== Classification ==
The Newar dances can be classified as traditional masked dances, folk dances, and ritual dances.

- Traditional masked dances
1. Lakhey dance
2. Asta Matrika Dance
3. Navadurga dance
4. Pulukisi dance (elephant dance)
5. Sawabhakku
6. Neelbarahi Naach, Bode, Madhyapur Thimi

The Majipa Lakhey dance is a masked dance characterized by vigorous movements and loud music. It is performed by the Ranjitkars of Kathmandu during the Yanya Punhi festival, also known as Indra Jatra, which occurs in September. The dancer and his attendants wander about the streets setting the tone of the festivities. The Gunla Lakhey dance is a similar street performance which tours various parts of the city during Gunla, the tenth month in the Nepal Sambat calendar, which corresponds to August. Almost all Newar settlements have a Lakhey dance troupe.

- Folk dances
1. Jyapu Pyakhan
2. Tekanpur Pyakhan
- Ritual dances
1. Charya dance
2. Gathu Pyakhan
3. Kumha Pyakhan dance
4. Daitya Pyakhan

Charya Nritya (Chachaa Pyakhan in Nepal Bhasa) is a Buddhist ritual dance with a history going back more than 1,000 years. It is performed by Newar Buddhist priests known as Bajracharya as part of their esoteric meditation practices and rituals. The dancers represent various deities like the Five Buddhas, Manjusri, Vajrayogini and Tara. The song accompanying the dance opens with a salutation and describes the deity's characteristics and accessories. Performances were shown only to the initiated. The first public showing was held during the Fourth World Buddhist Conference held in Kathmandu in 1956.
