= Majipa Lakhey =

Demon in Nepalese folklore

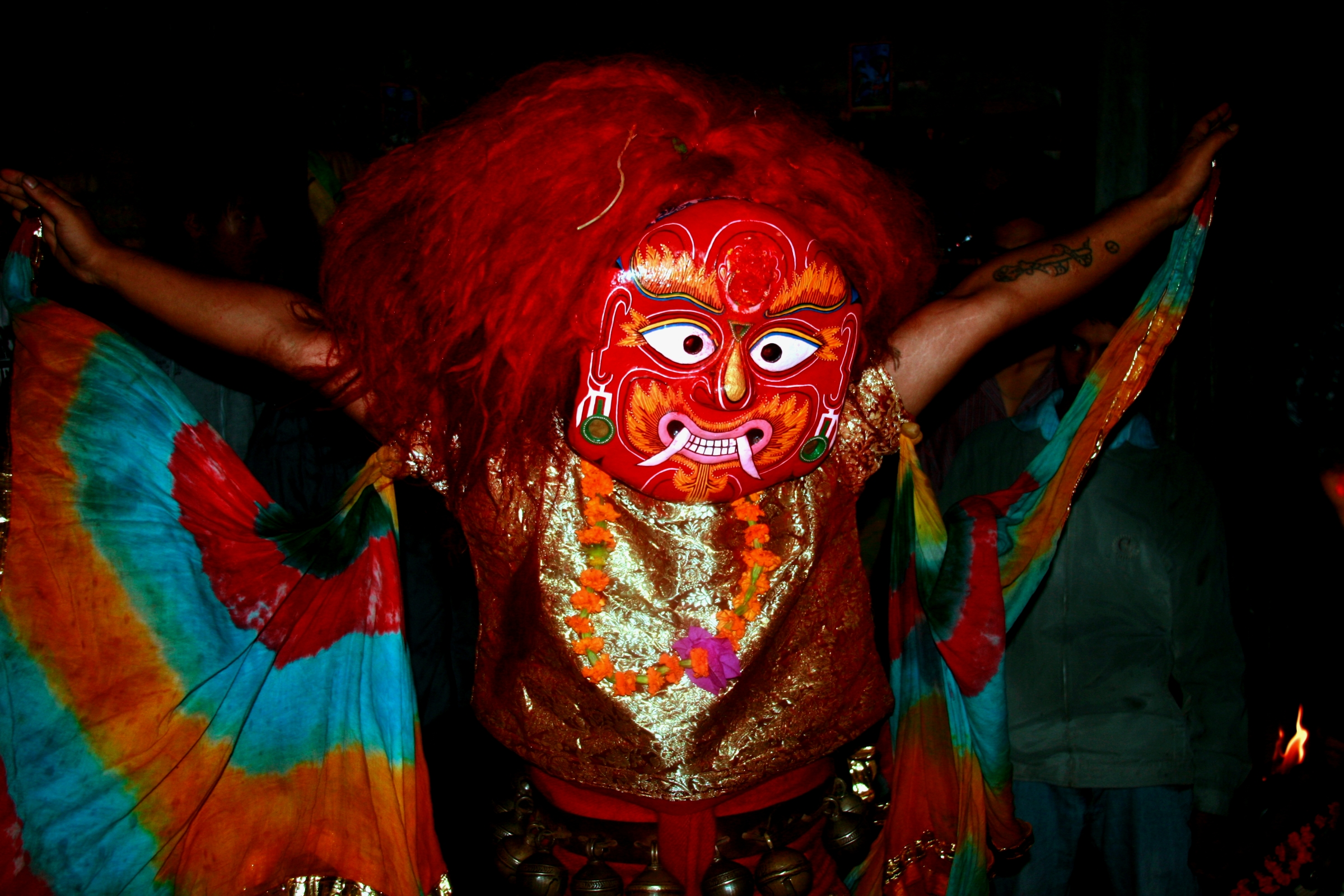
Majipa Lakhe of Kathmandu.

Majipa Lakhey (Nepal Bhasa: मजिपा लाखे, लाखे आजु Majipā Lākhē, Lākhē Āju) is a special lakhey in Nepalese folklore. He is also known as the Peaceful Bhairava (शान्त भैरव). The dance of this Lakhey takes place only in the week of the full moon of the month of Yenlaa of the Nepal Sambat calendar. He is considered to be the protector of the children.

== Etymology ==
The Newari word Majipa is derived from Sanskrit "Manjupattan" "Manjusri city". Lākhe is the term used to denote carnivorous demons. Majipa Lakhey literally means the "carnivorous demon of Majipa".

== Mythology ==
According to stories passed down through generations, majipa lakhey is supposed to have fallen in love with a girl from Majipa. So, the demon takes a form of a human and enters the city to see his beloved. Upon knowing the fact that the person is a Lakhey, the people capture the lakhey and present him to the king. The king makes a proposal to the demon that he will grant him a place in the city if he vows to protect the children from other demons and participate in the annual Yanyaa Punhi Jatra (also called Indra Jatra). The Lakhey agrees and is supposed to reside in Majipa ever since.

Another story links Lakhey to banishing the two cannibal children of the king Sawan Bhaku, after he was requested to do so by Akash Bhairav and Hanuman. However, the two children return to the city on Yanyaa Punhi to claim their rule and to devour humans. Lakhey is supposed to send them out of the city. This is symbolically represented in a dance conducted in Yanyaa Punhi every year. Majipa Lakhey's wife's name is Lashi, and their daughter's name was Lakhapati.

== Majipa Lakhey dance ==
During the Indra Jatra festival in Nepal, the Majipa Lakhey dance is conducted by the Ranjitkars of Kathmandu. Unlike in other traditional dances, the dancers are not trained in this dance. The Ranjitkars may have inherited this dance in their genes.

The costume of Lakhey consists of a mask with hair and costumes attached to it. Together, these costumes and the mask can weigh up to 50 kilograms (110 lb). Before donning the mask, 24 metres (79 ft) of clothing has to be worn. With all these additional weights, the Lakhey dance must still be performed easily and gracefully.

== See also ==
- Ranjitkar
- Lakhey
- Dance
- Newar
- Nepal
- Newari Dance
