= Nagarjun Municipality =

Nagarjun नागार्जुन
- Municipality (नगरपालिका)
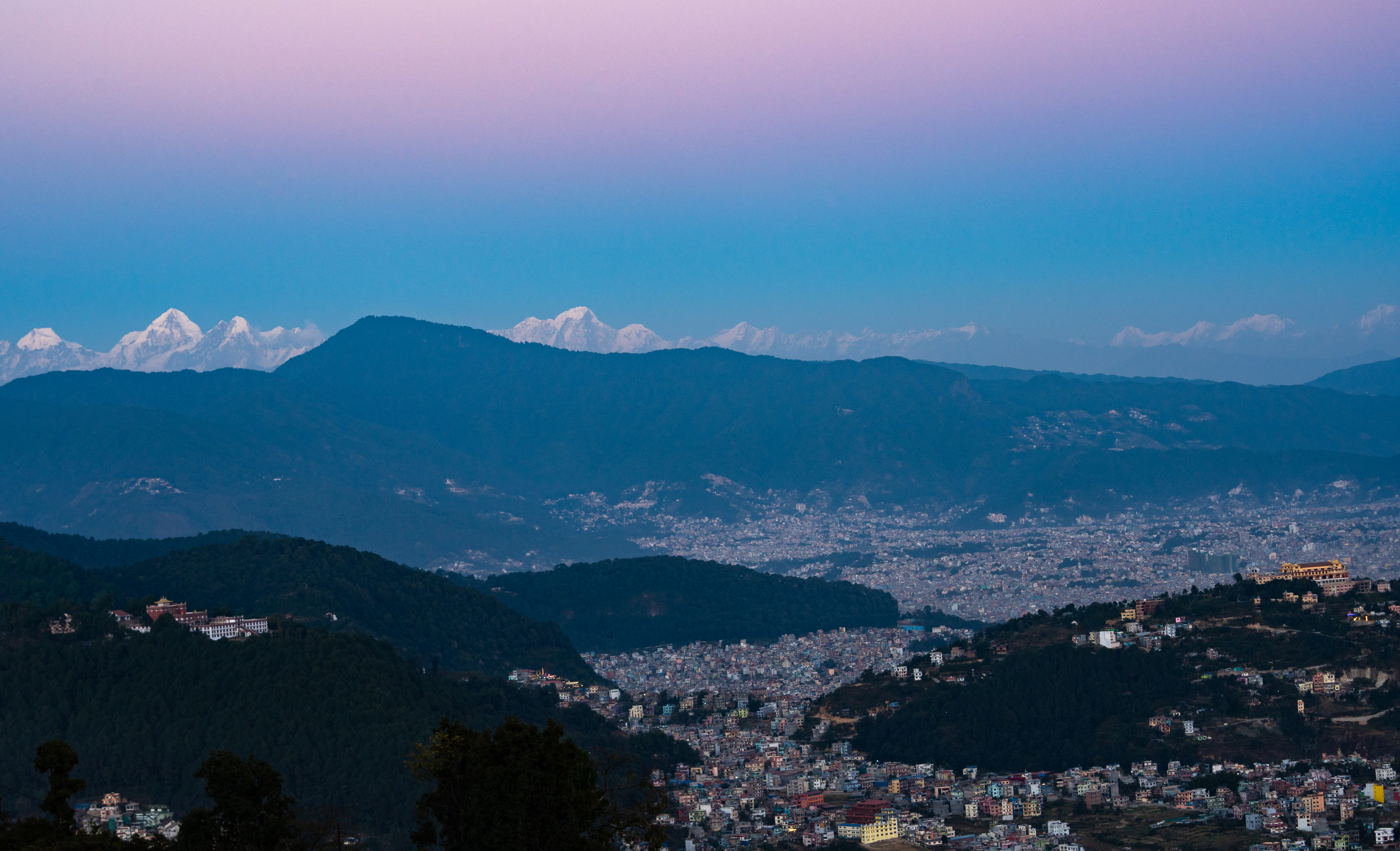
- Nagarjun municipality with Tarakeshwar and Budhanilkantha in background.

- Location in Nepal Nagarjun (Nepal)
- Coordinates: 27°43′57″N 85°15′24″E
- Country: Nepal
- Province: Bagmati
- District: Kathmandu
- Established: December 2014

Government
  - Mayor: Mohan Basnet (NC)
  - Deputy Mayor: Sushila Adhikari (NCP)

Area
  - Total: 29.8 km^{2} (11.5 sq mi)

Population (2021 Nepal census)
  - Total: 115,437
  - Density: 3,870/km^{2} (10,000/sq mi)
  - Ethnicities: Newar; Bahun; Chhetri; Tamang; Magar
- Time zone: UTC+5:45 (Nepal Time)
- Website: www.nagarjunmun.gov.np/en

Nagarjun is a municipality in Kathmandu District in Bagmati Province of Nepal. It was formed on 2 December 2014 by merging the former VDCs of Bhimdhunga, Ichangu Narayan, Ramkot, Syuchatar and Sitapaila. The office of the municipality is located at Harisiddhi, Sitapaila. There are ten wards in the municipality. The residence of Nepal's former king, Gyanendra, is in Nagarjun.

== Geography ==
It is surrounded by 13,14, 15 and 16 number wards of Kathmandu Metropolitan City on the east, Dhading District on the west, Tarkeshwar Municipality on the north and Chandragiri Municipality on the south. The area of the municipality is 29.8 square kilometres (11.5 sq mi) and the average altitude is 1,300 metres (4,300 ft) to 2,500 metres (8,200 ft) above sea level.

== Demographics ==
At the time of the 2011 Nepal census, Nagarjun Municipality had a population of 68,863. Of these, 71.1% spoke Nepali, 11.3% Newar, 8.9% Tamang, 2.0% Gurung, 1.4% Magar, 1.3% Maithili, 0.6% Rai, 0.6% Sherpa, 0.6% Tharu, 0.5% Bhojpuri, 0.4% Hindi, 0.2% Limbu, 0.2% Tibetan, 0.1% Doteli, 0.1% Kham, 0.1% Thakali, 0.1% Urdu and 0.2% other languages as their first language.

In terms of ethnicity/caste, 23.6% were Chhetri, 22.0% Hill Brahmin, 17.5% Newar, 13.6% Tamang, 4.8% Magar, 3.9% Sanyasi/Dasnami, 3.3% Gurung, 1.6% Thakuri, 1.4% Rai, 1.1% Tharu, 0.8% Kami, 0.8% Musalman, 0.7% other Dalit, 0.6% Sherpa, 0.5% Damai/Dholi, 0.4% Limbu, 0.3% Gharti/Bhujel, 0.3% Thakali, 0.2% Badi, 0.2% Ghale, 0.2% Majhi, 0.2% Sarki, 0.2% Yadav, 0.1% Bhote, 0.1% Terai Brahmin, 0.1% Dhanuk, 0.1% Dura, 0.1% Hajjam/Thakur, 0.1% Halwai, 0.1% Kalwar, 0.1% Koiri/Kushwaha, 0.1% Kumal, 0.1% Marwadi, 0.1% Sunuwar, 0.1% Teli, 0.1% other Terai and 0.2% others.

In terms of religion, 82.3% were Hindu, 14.1% Buddhist, 2.4% Christian, 0.8% Muslim, 0.3% Kirati and 0.1% others.

In terms of literacy, 85.1% could read and write, 1.7% could only read and 13.1% could neither read nor write.

The population of the municipality grew to 115,437 at the 2021 Nepal census. Around 99.4% of the residents were Nepali citizens and 89.2% were literate in 2021.

== Popular sites ==
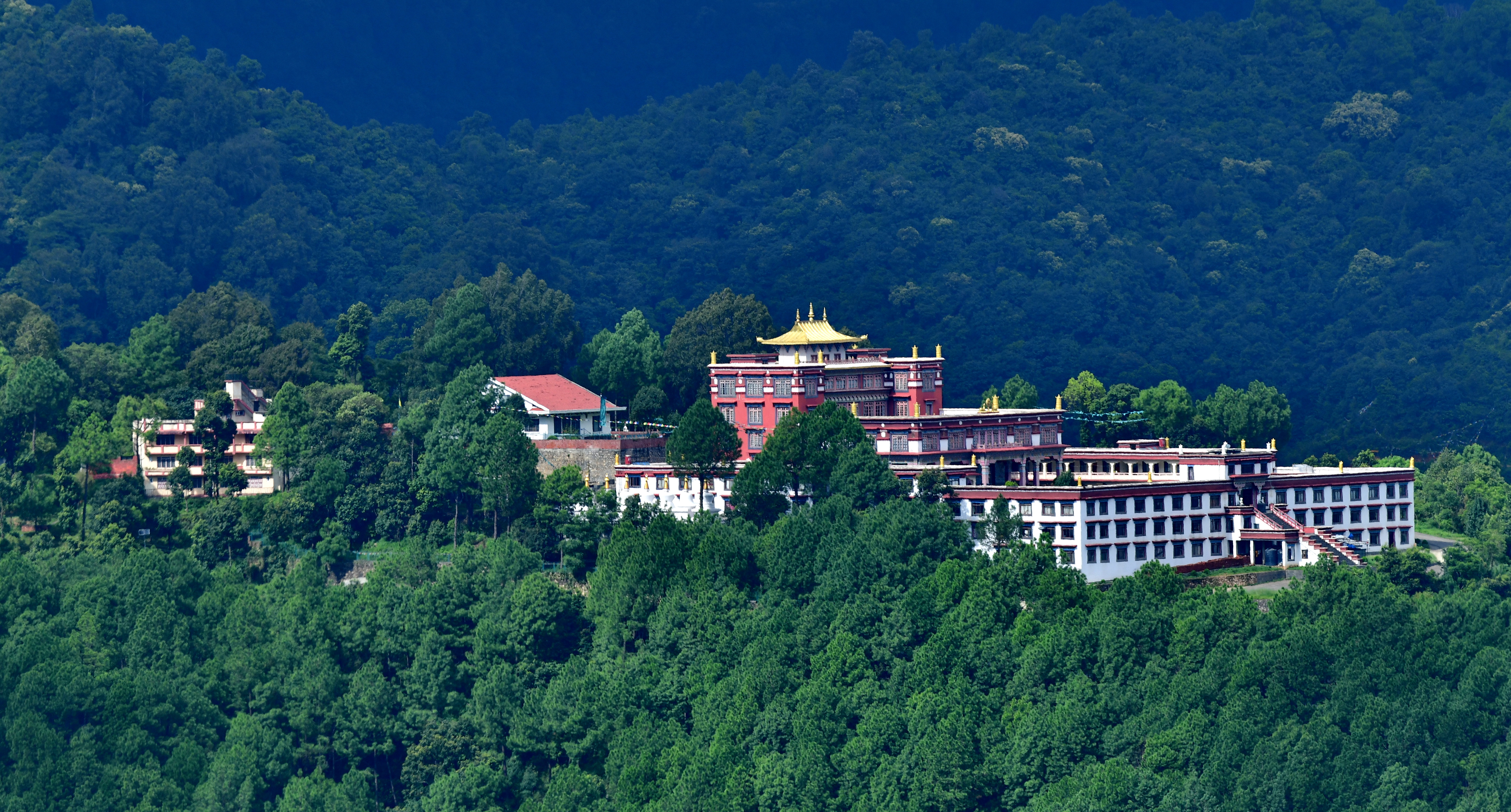
Amitabha Monastery, Ramkot

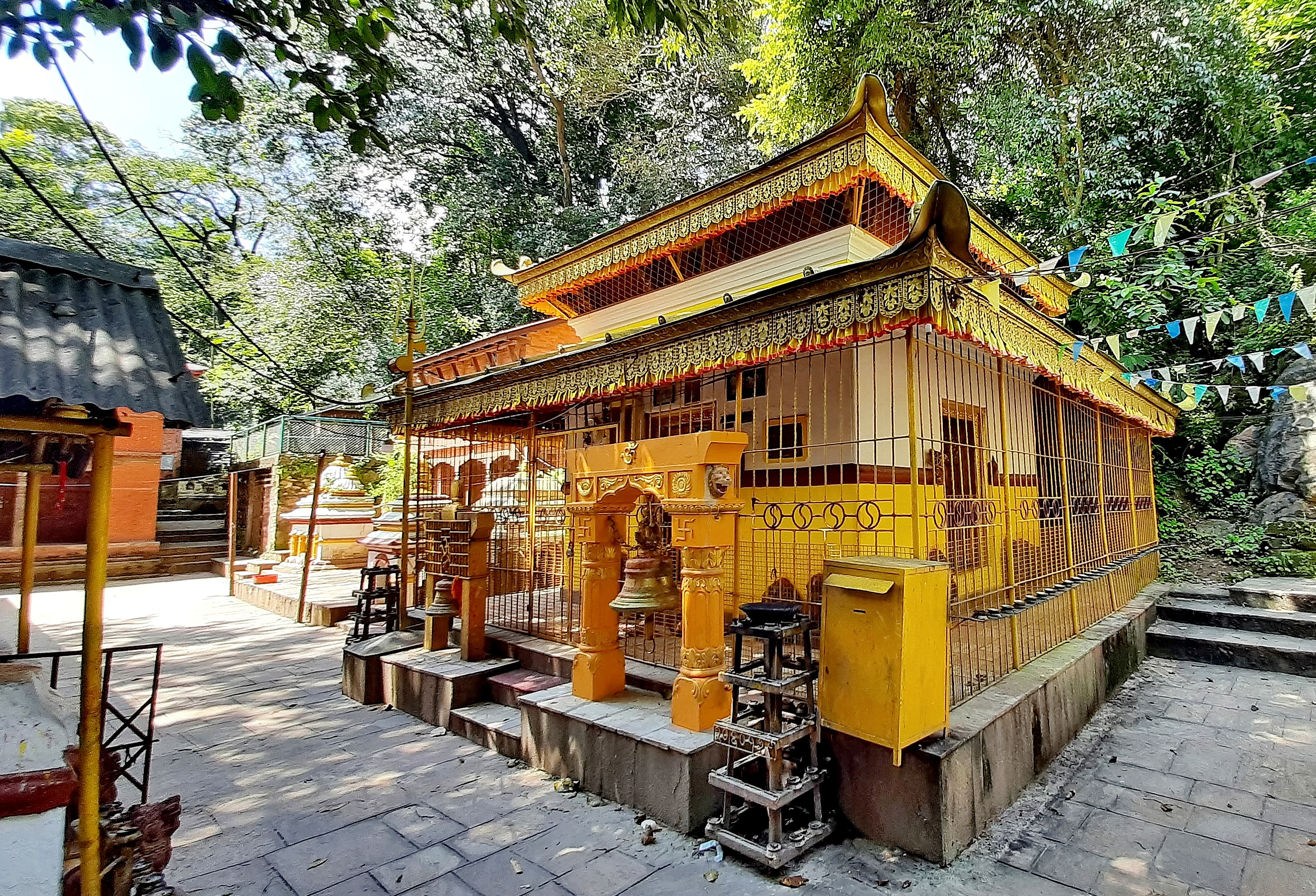
Aadeswor Mahadev Temple, a Shiva Temple in Sitapaila

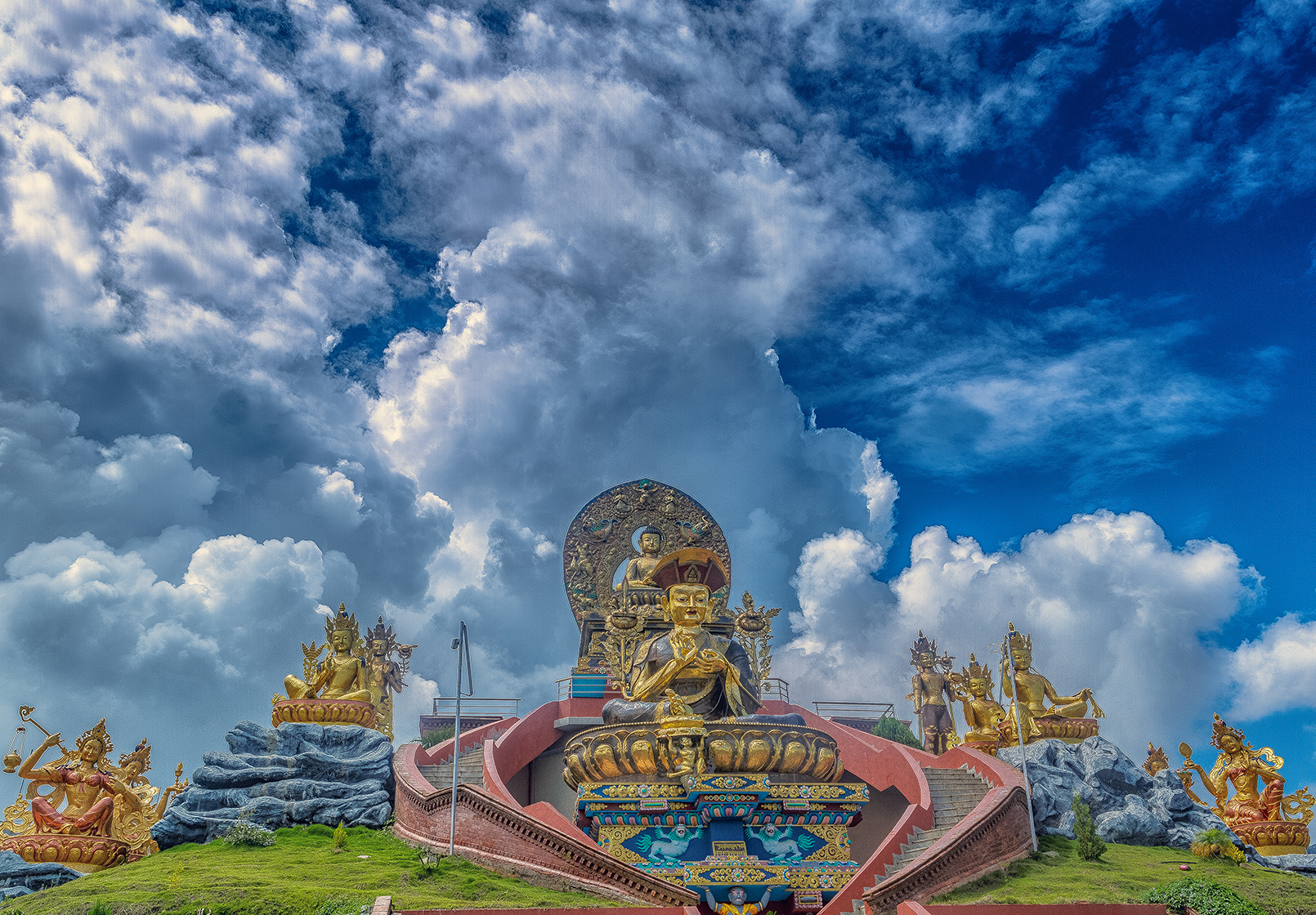
Statues inside Amitabha Monastery, Ramkot

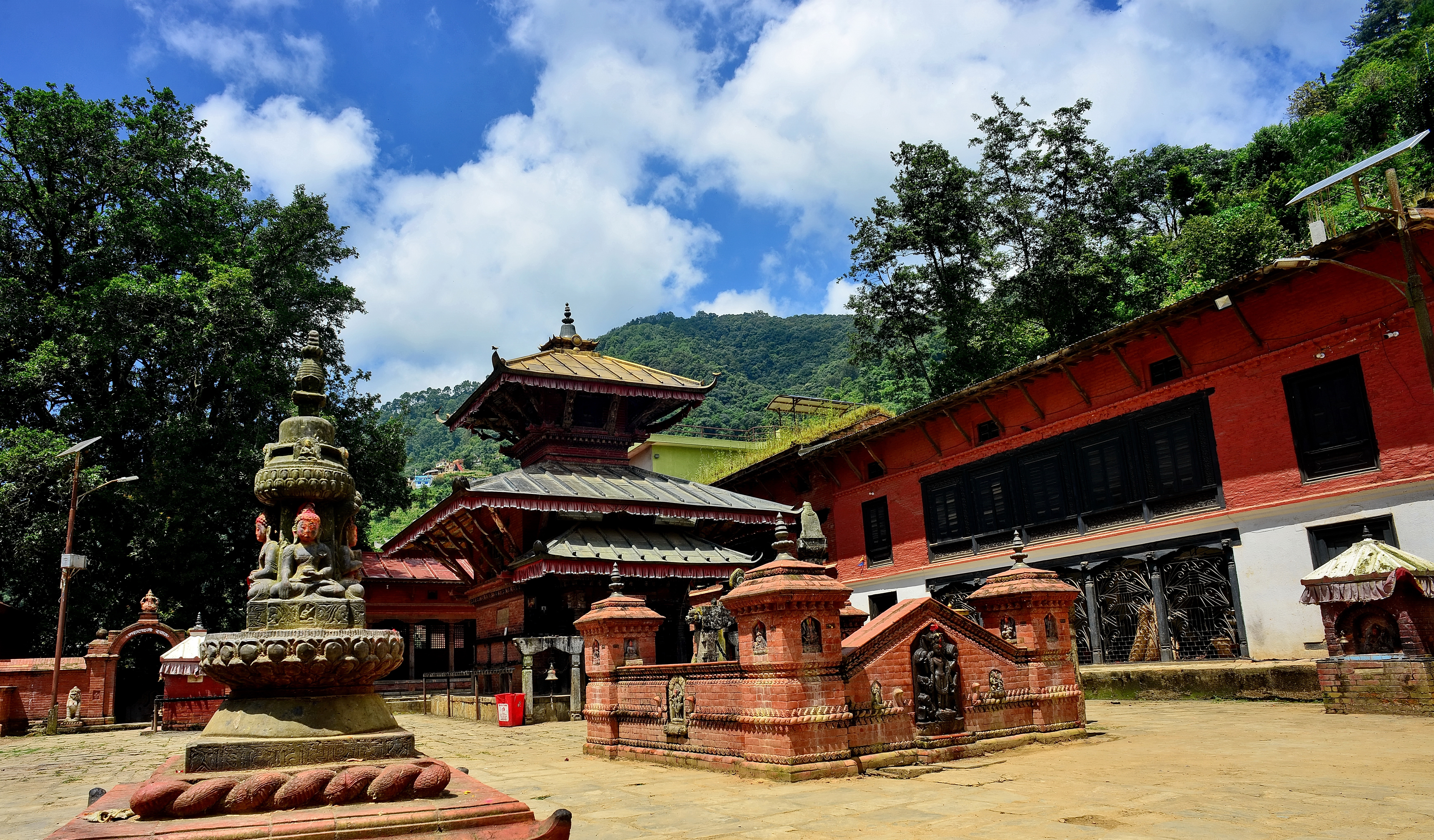
Ichangu Narayan Temple
- Ichangu Narayan Temple
- Amitabha Monastery
- Aadeswor Mahadev Temple
- Halchowk Akash Bhairav
- Tarkeshwar Temple
- Badri Narayan Dham
- Sahid Park
- Switzerland Park
- Panch Kanya Temple
- Bhuwaneswori Temple
