= Krishna Gopal Shrestha =

Nepali politician

Honourable Krishna Gopal Shrestha
- कृष्ण गोपाल श्रेष्ठ

Minister of Education, Science and Technology
- In office 25 December 2020 – 13 July 2021
- President: Bidya Devi Bhandari
- Prime Minister: K. P. Sharma Oli
- Preceded by: Giriraj Mani Pokharel
- Succeeded by: Devendra Paudel

Minister of Forests and Environment
- In office 24 June 2021 – 12 July 2021
- President: Bidya Devi Bhandari
- Prime Minister: K. P. Sharma Oli
- Preceded by: Narad Muni Rana

Minister of Labour, Employment and Social Security
- In office 24 June 2021 – 13 July 2021
- President: Bidya Devi Bhandari
- Prime Minister: K. P. Sharma Oli
- Preceded by: Bimal Prasad Shrivastav

Minister of Youth and Sports
- In office 24 June 2021 – 13 July 2021
- President: Bidya Devi Bhandari
- Prime Minister: K. P. Sharma Oli
- Preceded by: Ekbal Miya

Minister of Health and Population
- In office 24 June 2021 – 13 July 2021
- President: Bidya Devi Bhandari
- Prime Minister: K. P. Sharma Oli
- Preceded by: Sher Bahadur Tamang

Minister of Urban Development
- In office 14 October 2020 – 25 December 2020
- President: Bidya Devi Bhandari
- Prime Minister: K. P. Sharma Oli

State Minister for Local Development
- In office 10 June 2004 – 2 February 2005
- Monarch: Gyanendra
- Prime Minister: Sher Bahadur Deuba

Member of Parliament, Pratinidhi Sabha
- In office 4 March 2018 – 12 September 2025
- Preceded by: Dhyan Govinda Ranjit
- Succeeded by: Dol Prasad Aryal (elect)
- Constituency: Kathmandu 9
- In office October 1994 – May 1999
- Preceded by: Constituency created
- Succeeded by: Tirtha Ram Dangol
- Constituency: Kathmandu 9
- In office 1992 – August 1994
- Preceded by: Madan Bhandari
- Succeeded by: Rajendra Prasad Shrestha
- Constituency: Kathmandu 5

Personal details
- Born: 22 September 1958 (age 67)
- Party: CPN (UML)
- Other political affiliations: CPN (ML)

Krishna Gopal Shrestha (Nepali: कृष्ण गोपाल श्रेष्ठ) is a Nepali communist politician and former minister of Nepal. He belongs to the CPN(UML).

== Political career ==
Shrestha joined politics in 1979 as a member of CPN ML, the predecessor of CPN UML. He was arrested and imprisoned multiple times during the fight against the partyless Panchayat system. He became the party's Kathmandu district secretary in 1982. He became Bhaktapur district secretary in 1986, and Lalitpur district secretary in 1990. After the formation of CPN UML, he had remained the party's central committee member from 1998 to 2018, when the party was merged with CPN (Maoist Centre).

He was elected from Kathmandu-5 constituency in the by-election of 1992, after party secretary Madan Bhandari vacated the seat. He won the 1994 legislative election from Kathmandu-7 constituency. He was defeated in Kathmandu-9 in the 1999 election.

He was appointed the State Minister for Local Development in 2005.

In the 2008 constituent assembly election, he contested from Kathmandu-9 again, but was defeated. In the 2013 election for the second constituent assembly, he was the CPN UML candidate in Kathmandu-9 constituency but lost again to his longtime rival Dhyan Govinda Ranjit of Nepali Congress.

In the 2017 election, he was elected from Kathmandu-9 constituency representing CPN UML of the left alliance.

Following the merger of CPN UML with CPN (Maoist Centre), he was appointed the deputy chief of the treasury and financial management department of the new party.

== Personal life ==
He was born on October 1, 1958, to Hari Lal and Hari Maya Shrestha in Kathmandu. He has said that he came from a humble background, and was admitted directly to the fifth grade, having been self-taught up to that point. He went on to achieve a Master's Degree in Economics. He has two daughters.
