= Bhimdhunga =

Bhimdhunga भीमढुंगा
- Village of Nagarjun Municipality
- Location in Nepal
- Coordinates: 27°43′48″N 85°14′24″E
- Country: Nepal
- Province: Province No. 3
- District: Kathmandu

Population (2011)
  - Total: 2,915
  - Religions: Hindu
- Time zone: UTC+5:45 (Nepal Time)

Bhimdhunga is a village and former Village Development Committee that is now part of Nagarjun Municipality in Province No. 3 of central Nepal. At the time of the 2011 Nepal census it had a population of 2,915 and had 619 houses in it.

== Toponymy ==
=== Linguistic family ===
- Linguistic family: Indoeuropean
- Language: Sanskrit

=== Etymology ===
“Bhim” is the name of one of the Pandava brothers, regarded as strong and brave. “Dhunga” means stone. According to tradition, the place contains a stone said to have been thrown or moved by Bhim, which is why it is called Bhimdhunga.

Bhim (भीम) is the name of a legendary warrior figure from the Mahabharata, derived from Sanskrit भीम (bhīma) meaning “formidable, mighty, terrifying". Dhunga (ढुंगा) means “stone” and comes from Sanskrit शिला (śilā) or local Nepali term ढुंगा (ḍhuṅgā) meaning “rock/stone".
