= Syuchatar =

Syuchatar स्यूचाटार
- Village of Nagarjun Municipality
- Location in Nepal
- Coordinates: 27.71°N 85.27°E
- Country: Nepal
- Province: Bagmati Province
- District: Kathmandu

Population (1991)
  - Total: 4,449
- Time zone: UTC+5:45 (Nepal Time)

Syuchatar is a village and former Village Development Committee that is now a part of the Nagarjun Municipality in Province No. 3 in central Nepal. At the time of the 1991 Nepal census it had a population of 4,449 and had 779 households in it.
