= Ichangu Narayan =

Ichangu Narayan इचंगुनारायण
- Village of Nagarjun Municipality
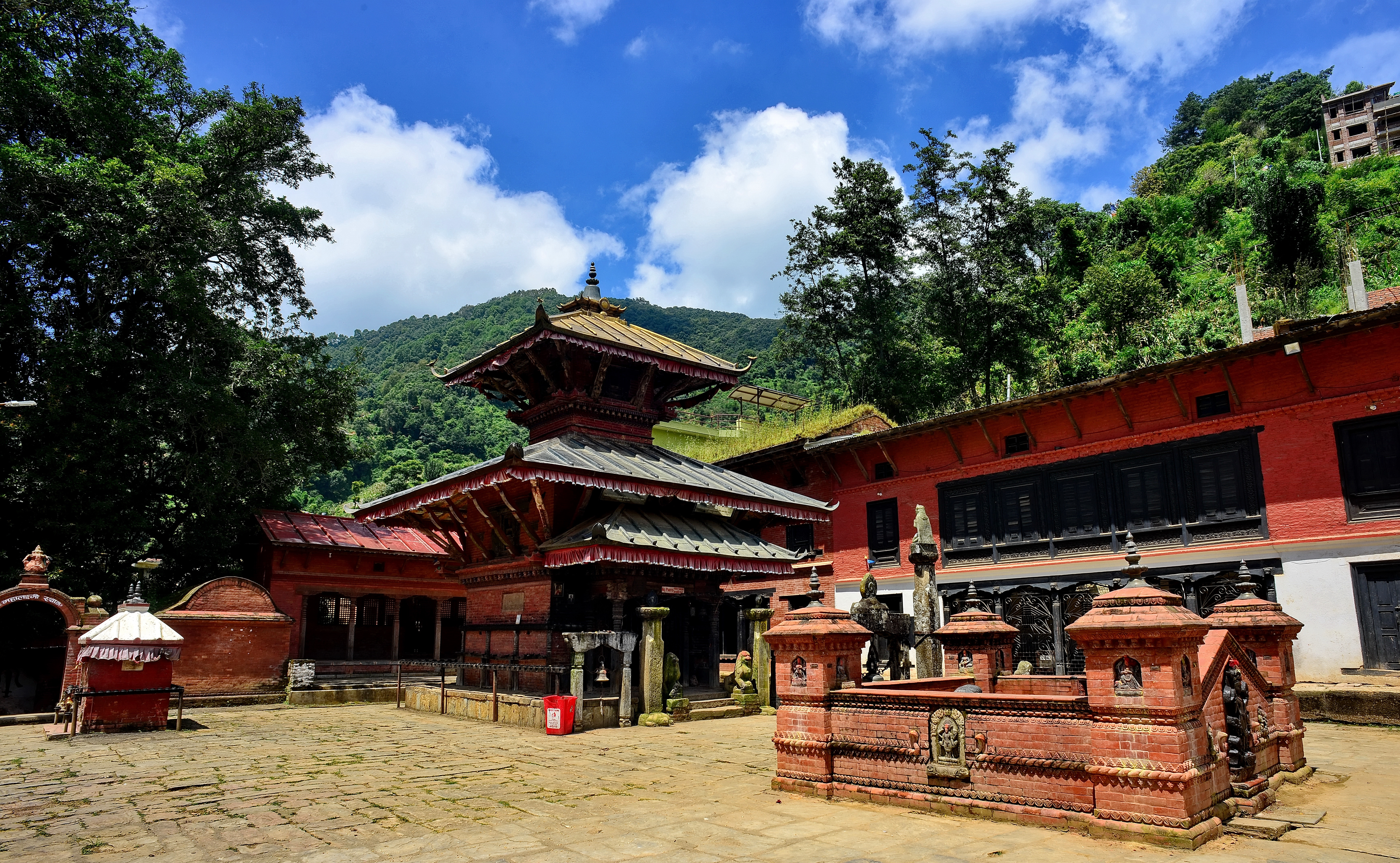
- Inchangunarayan temple in Nagarjuna municipality of Kathmandu

- Location in Nepal
- Coordinates: 27.44°N 85.16°E
- Country: Nepal
- Province: Province No. 3
- District: Kathmandu

Population (2011)
  - Total: 24,425
- Time zone: UTC+5:45 (Nepal Time)

Ichangu Narayan is a village and former Village Development Committee that is now part of Nagarjun Municipality in Province No. 3 of central Nepal. At the time of the 2011 Nepal census it had a population of 24,425 and had 6,288 households in it.

== Toponymy ==
=== Language origin ===
- Linguistic family: Sino-Tibetan / Indoeuropean
- Language: Newari / Sanskrit

=== Etymology ===
“Ichangu” is likely of Newar (Nepal Bhasa) origin, though its precise etymology is unclear; it refers to a local settlement or ancient toponym. “Narayan” is an epithet of the Hindu god Vishnu. Therefore, Ichangu Narayan means “the temple of Vishnu (Narayan) at Ichangu.”

Ichangu (इचंगु) likely from Newar/Nepal Bhasa, possibly related to terrain or clan names, but the etymology is uncertain. Narayan (नारायण) is an epithet of Vishnu, from Sanskrit नारायण (Nārāyaṇa) meaning “the resting place of man / the supreme being.” The toponym Ichangu Narayan is a hybrid name, combining a local Newar settlement name with a Sanskrit religious epithet, indicating the sacred Vishnu temple located at Ichangu, west of Kathmandu.
