= Ranjitkar =

Ranjitkars
Regions with significant populations
- Nepal

Languages
- Nepal Bhasa

Religion
- Buddhism, Hinduism

Related ethnic groups
- probably Indo-Aryans eg-Thakuri, Maithil and Sino-Tibetan eg-Kirants, Tibetans, Magar, Gurung in and around Nepal

Ranjitkar (रञ्जितकार a.k.a. Chhipaa or Ranjit) is one of the castes of Newar. The Newari caste system is divided according to profession. The Ranjitkar caste is concerned with the dyeing of clothes as well as other color related activities. The word "Ranjitkar" comes from Sanskrit origins crudely meaning "people concerned with colors" whereas the word "Chhipaa" is a Nepal Bhasa compound word which can be roughly translated as "color and allow to dry".

== History ==
There are very few written historic documents on Ranjitkars. However, judging by the extravagant clothing that are seen in the sculptures, one can speculate that Ranjitkars or some other people were present in the Nepal during the Licchavi era by latest. The first mention of Ranjitkars in written history might have been during the declaration of the division of castes by Jayasthiti Malla.

== Race ==
Ethnically, Ranjitkars like other Newar communities are of diverse origin including but not limited to various Indic and Tibeto-Burman tribes. They have features resembling both Tibeto Burman and Aryans. So, one may infer that Ranjitkars are heterogeneous groups rather that a kin or ethnically homogeneous group.

== Religion ==
Like all Newās, Ranjitkars follow a syncretic Hindu-Buddhist religion. The priest of Ranjitkars are Bajrachharyas who are Buddhists. However, most of the rituals performed are Hindu. Recently, an emergence of Theravada Buddhism has been observed in the Ranjitkars especially amongst those in Kathmandu.

== Language ==
Nepal Bhasa is the native tongue of the Ranjitkars. Nowadays many youngsters use the Nepali language as well.

== Location ==
There are three main localities of Ranjitkars in Kathmandu valley. They are in Majipā (मजिपा) of Yen (Downtown Kathmandu), a locality in Yala (Patan) and Golmadi in Bhaktapur. Besides these, Ranjitkars have settlements in Kirtipur, Hetaunda, Bhimphedi, Madhyapur, Dhulikhel, Banepa, Trishuli, Balaju, Mahalaxmi and other cities of Nepal. With modernization and migration, many Ranjitkars have migrated and settled in different parts of the globe.

== Festivals ==
Ranjitkars celebrate almost all of the festivals of Newars. The major festivals which celebrated by the community are as follows:

=== Majipa Lakhey Dance ===
Majipa Lakhey (Lakhey Aaju, Devnagari: मजिपा लाखे, लाखे आजु) is a special Lakhey. He is also known as the peaceful Bhairav. The dance of this lakhey takes place only in the week of full moon of Yenlaa month of Nepal Sambat during Kumari Jatra which is the biggest religious street festival in Kathmandu, Nepal. This lakhey is considered to be the protector of the children. The dance is especially conducted by the Ranjitkars of Kathmandu. The dress and mask of the Majipa Lakhey are kept in Majipa Lakhey Chhen (Home).

=== Baalaa Charhe ===
Also known as Baalaa Chaturdashi, it is celebrated according to lunar calendar. The festival is primarily centered in Yen(Kathmandu). It is a festival revering the deitified female ancestor called Ajima (from Newari Aji=grandmother, Ma=Mother). A guthi of Baakunani actively participates in the jatra held on the day.

=== Yenya Punhi ===
Yenya Punhi is celebrated on the full moon day of Yenla month of the Nepali calendar. Also known as Indra Jatra, it is one of the greatest festival of Yen. Majipa Lakhe dance is one of the main attractions of the jatra. Majipa Lakhey is considered as the calm Bhairab who protects children from evils and demons. A guthi in Lakhenani organises the dance which takes place for a week. Majipa Lakhey Deity is one of the most popular symbol of Nepalese culture and religion.

=== Buddha Jayanti ===
The day marks the birth, enlightenment and nirvana of Gautama Buddha.

== Lifestyle ==
With the Independence of India, annexation of Tibet by the People's Republic of China and fall of Rana regime in Nepal, the traditional lifestyle breathed its last and made way for new Nepal. The traditional designated dye related work became non-viable due to open market of Nepal which allowed open inflow of refined fabrics and dyed products. So, most of the Ranjitkars have given up the traditional profession. However, some have "evolved" their profession by working as experts for the Royals of Nepal. These people blend the valuable metals into the clothes as well as maintain and repair Shreepech (crown of Nepal).

In the last six decades, Ranjitkars have evolved as one of the literate castes of Nepal. Ranjitkars have thus been contributing in almost every walk of Nepalese society as educated professionals.

== Famous Ranjitkars ==
- Dhyan Govinda Ranjit
