= Sitapaila =

Sitapaila सीतापाइला
- Village of Nagarjun Municipality
- Location in Nepal
- Coordinates: 27.72°N 85.28°E
- Country: Nepal
- Province: Province No. 3
- District: Kathmandu

Population (1991)
  - Total: 5,156
- Time zone: UTC+5:45 (Nepal Time)

Sitapaila is a village and former Village Development Committee that is now part of Nagarjun Municipality in Province No. 3 of central Nepal. The name of the community comes from "Sita" who was the wife of Lord Ram and daughter of Nepalese King Janak and "paila" meaning footsteps in Nepali. At the time of the 1991 Nepal census it had a population of 5,156 and had 1,008 households in it.
