= Lakhey =

Demon in Nepalese Folklore

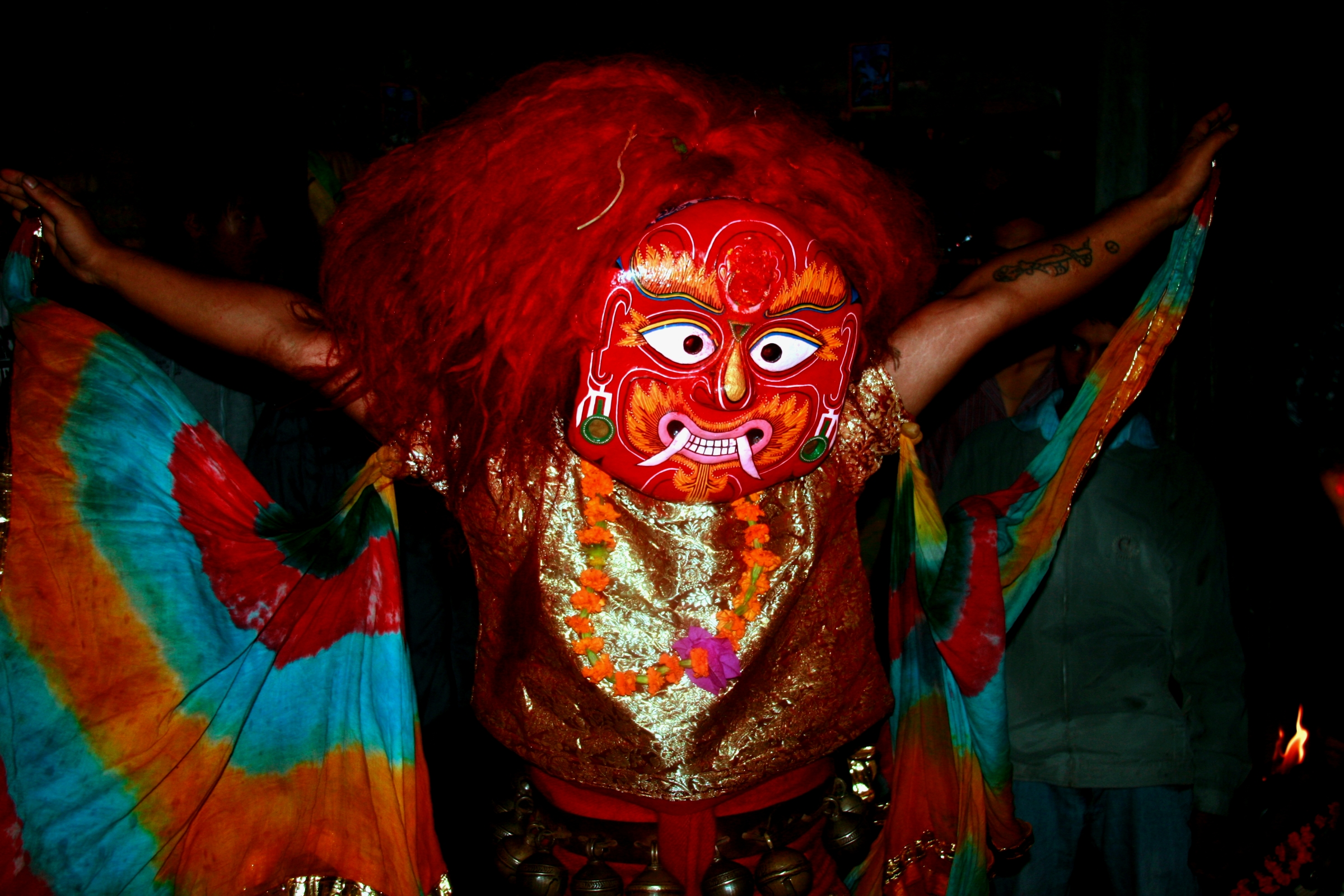
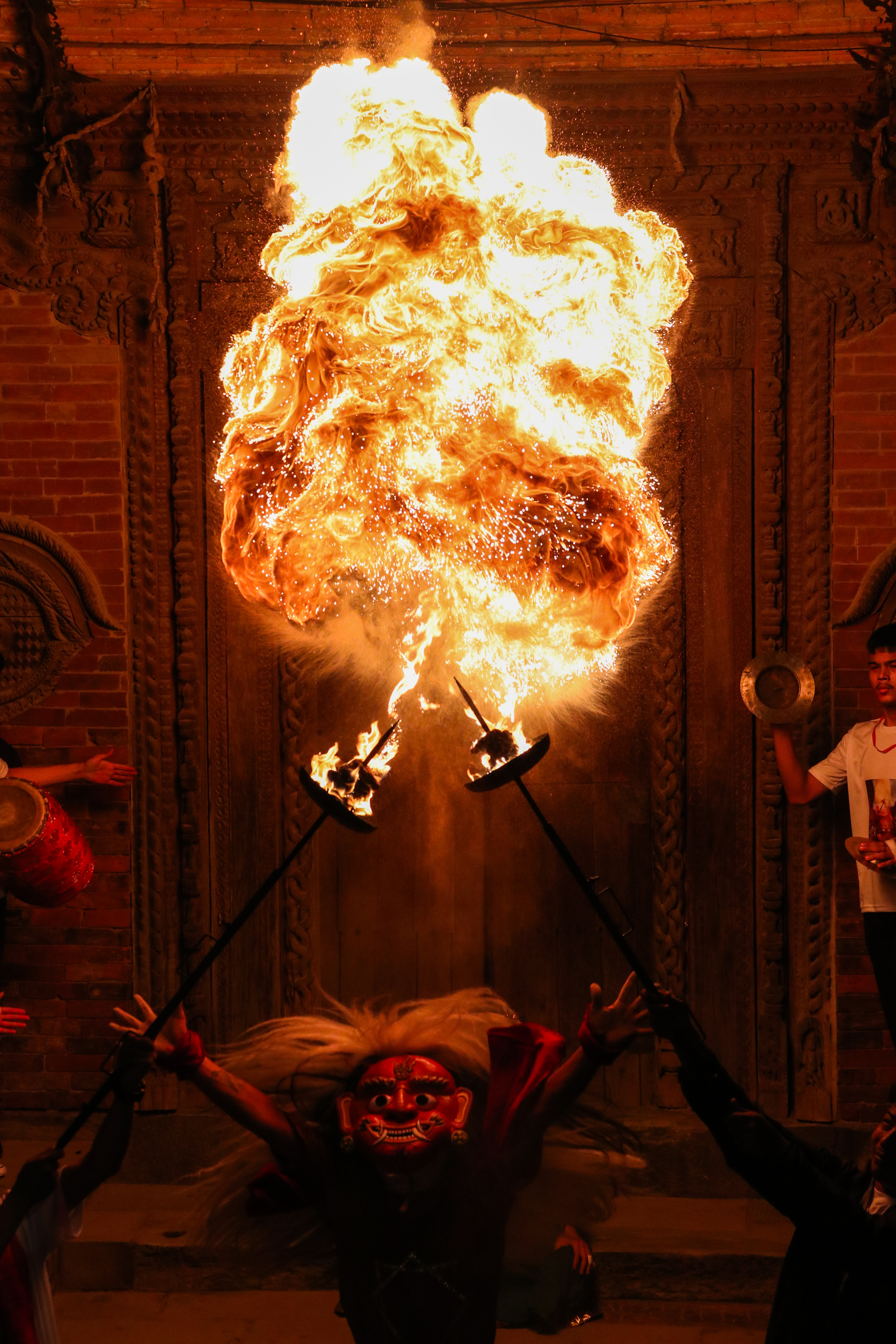
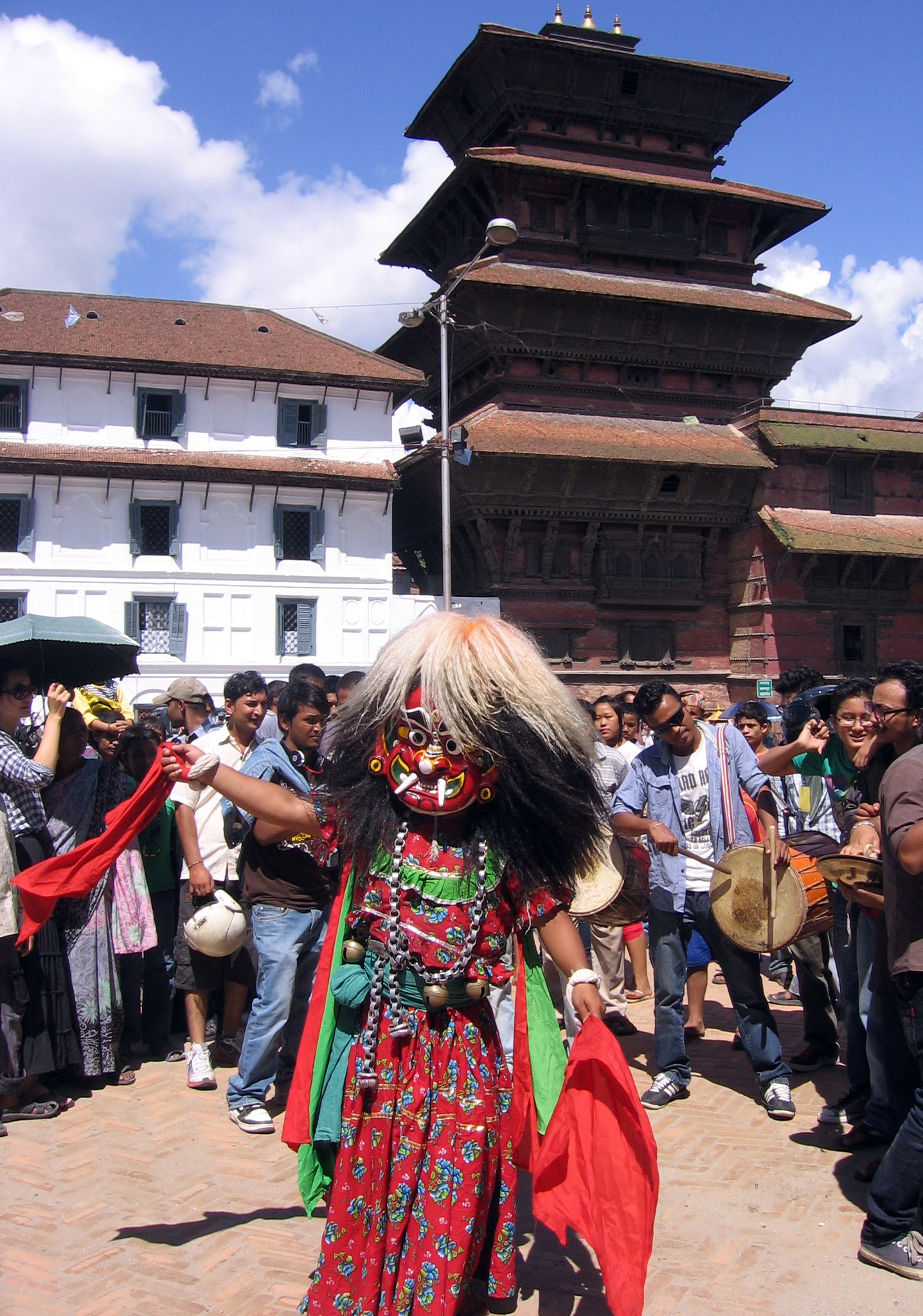
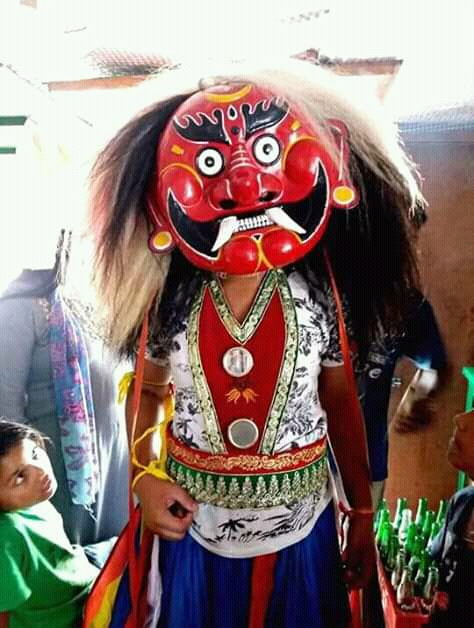
Lakhey Dance. Clockwise from upper left: Majipa Lakhey of Kathmandu, Mipwa Lakhey of Lalitpur, A Lakhey and Bhojpur Lakhey.

Lākhey (Nepal Bhasa: लाखे or 𑐮𑐵𑐏𑐾, lā-khé) (alternative spellings Lākhe, Lākhay, 𑐮𑐵𑐏𑐫𑑂 ) is a demon in Nepalese folklore. He is depicted with a ferocious face, protruding fangs and a mane of red, white or black hair. The traditional performance represents the dance of a demon in the carnival of God. Lakhes figure prominently in the traditional Newar culture of Nepal Mandala. The Lakhe tradition is found in the Kathmandu Valley and other Newar settlements throughout Nepal.

Lakhes are said to be demons who used to live in the forests and later became protectors to the townspeople. A female Lakhe is known as Lasin (𑐮𑐳𑐶𑑄). The other common legendary being in Nepalese folklore is the Khyāh, who is depicted as a fat, hairy ape-like creature.

== Lakhey Dance ==
Lakhey Dance is one of the most popular dances of Nepal. Performers wearing a Lakhe costume and mask perform dances on the streets and city squares during festivals. The mask is made of papier-mâché, and yak tails are used for the hair. The Lakhe dance is characterised by wild movements and thumping music.

The most famous Lakhe is Majipa Lakhey of Kathmandu who appears during the Yenya (Indra Jatra) festival in September. He is worshipped as a deity. City dwellers offer food and ritual items to him as he moves through the city accompanied by his musical band giving dance performances.

The Lakhe stops at major crossroads and market squares to give a performance. During the dance, a small boy, known as Jhyalincha (झ्यालिंचा), taunts the Lakhe, making him chase him in anger. Jhyalincha always manages to slip into the crowd and escape.

Gunla Lakhe comes out during Gunla, the 10th month in the Nepal Sambat calendar, which corresponds to August.

== Other Lakhes ==
There are other Lakhes with particular characteristics. These mythical beings are said to reside in various parts of the city.

- Michyāh Lākhe (मिच्या: लाखे) (meaning "fire burning demon" in Nepal Bhasa) is a spirit who is said to cause a fire by spontaneous combustion wherever it resides. People possessed by Michyāh Lakhe are also believed to cause a fire.
- Minpu Lākhe (मिंपू लाखे) also causes a fire.

== See also ==
- Majipa Lakhey
- Indra Jatra
