= Amitabha Monastery =

Himalayan Buddhist monastery in Nepal

Druk Amitabha Monastery
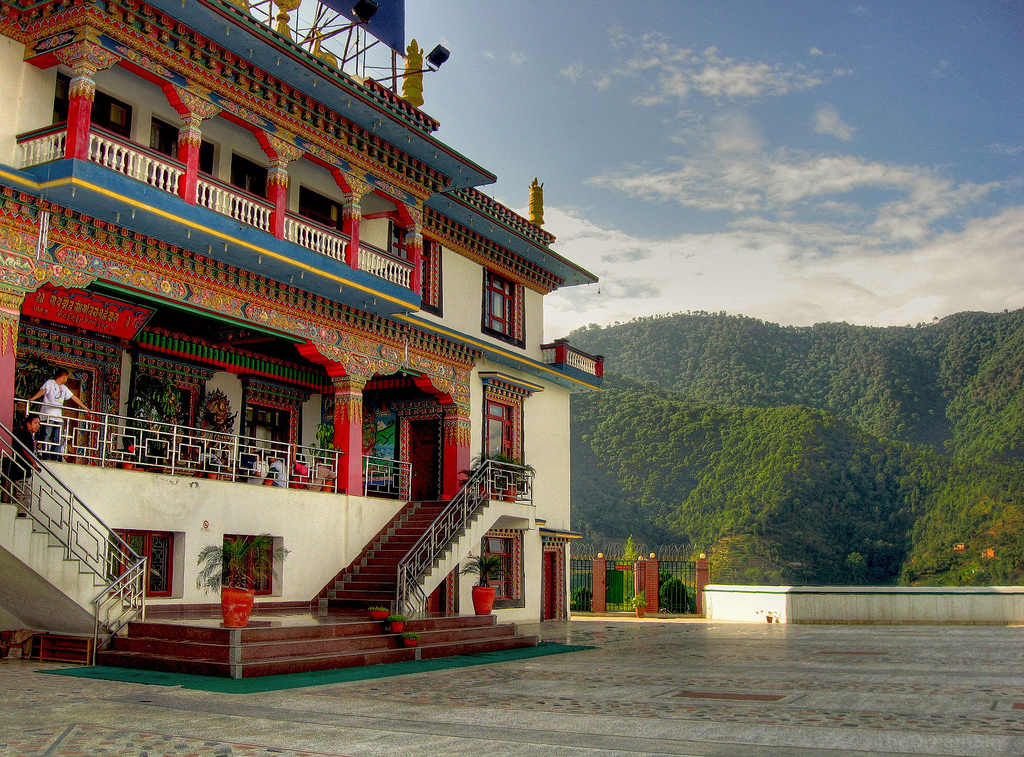

- Location within Nepal

Religion
- Affiliation: Tibetan Buddhism
- Deity: Amitābha

Location
- Location: Kathmandu
- Country: Nepal
- Interactive map of Druk Amitabha Monastery

Amitabha Monastery is a Himalayan Buddhist monastery in Nepal.

== Overview ==
The Amitabha Monastery sits on the top of Druk Amitabha mountain overlooking Kathmandu Valley. It is a center for spiritual practice and for humanitarian causes It has a hall that seats up to 2,000 people, a library, administration office for the Drukpa Lineage, a nunnery, residences for 300 nuns, and a medical clinic. It is a refuge for animals saved from butchering and has vegetable gardens to provide food for the center. The hiking trail here are as attractive as the monastery and the surrounding scenarios.

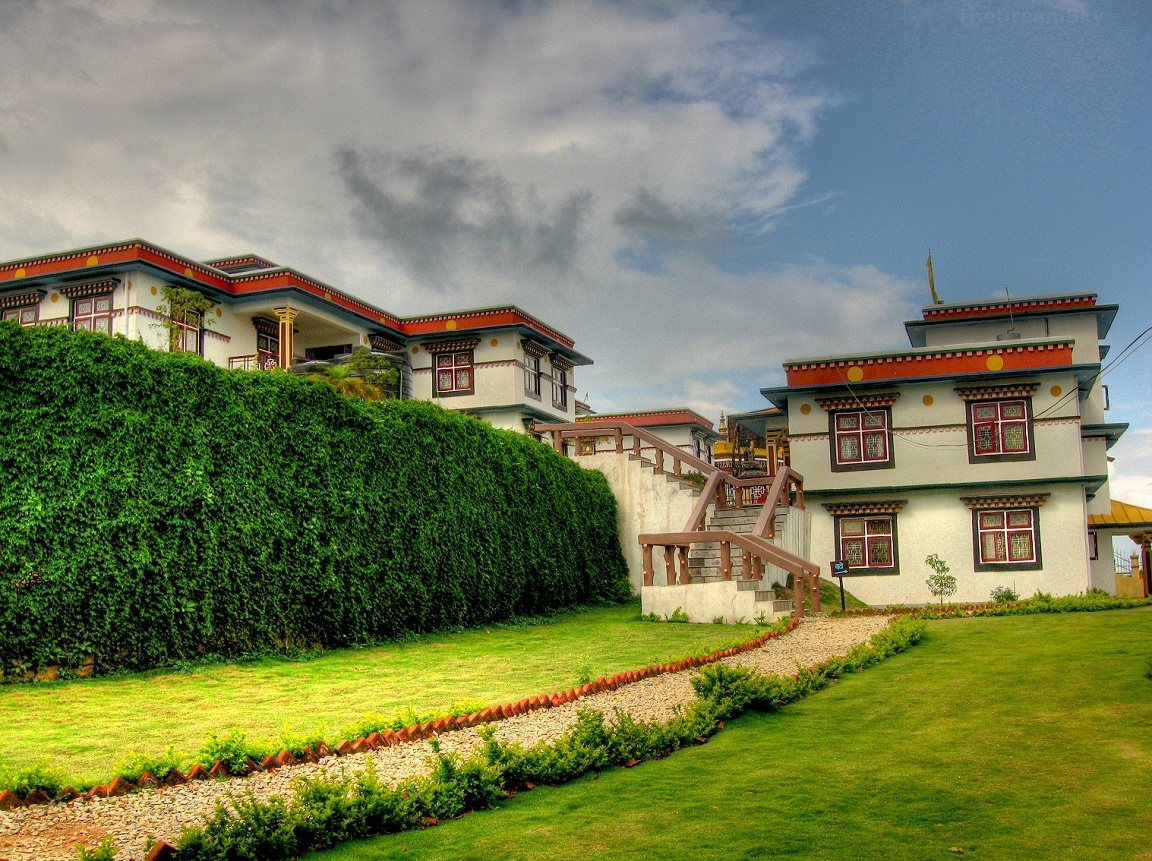
Amitabha Monastery

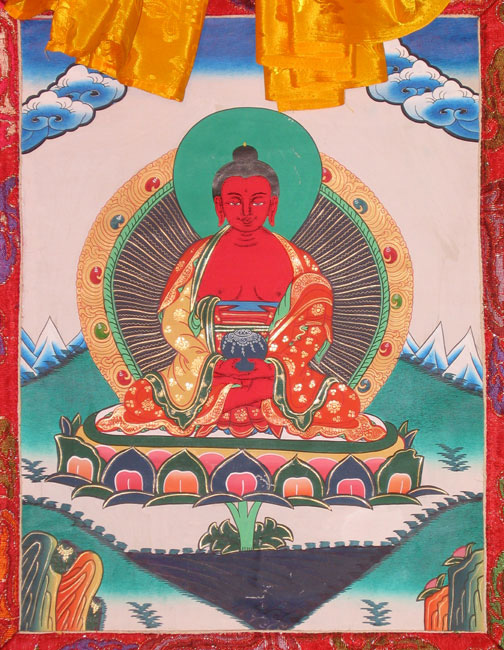
Buddha Amitābha in Himalayan Buddhism, traditional Thangka painting.
