= Ichangu Narayan Temple =

Ancient hindu temple in Kathmandu, Nepal

KID Temple
- इचंगुनारायण मन्दिर
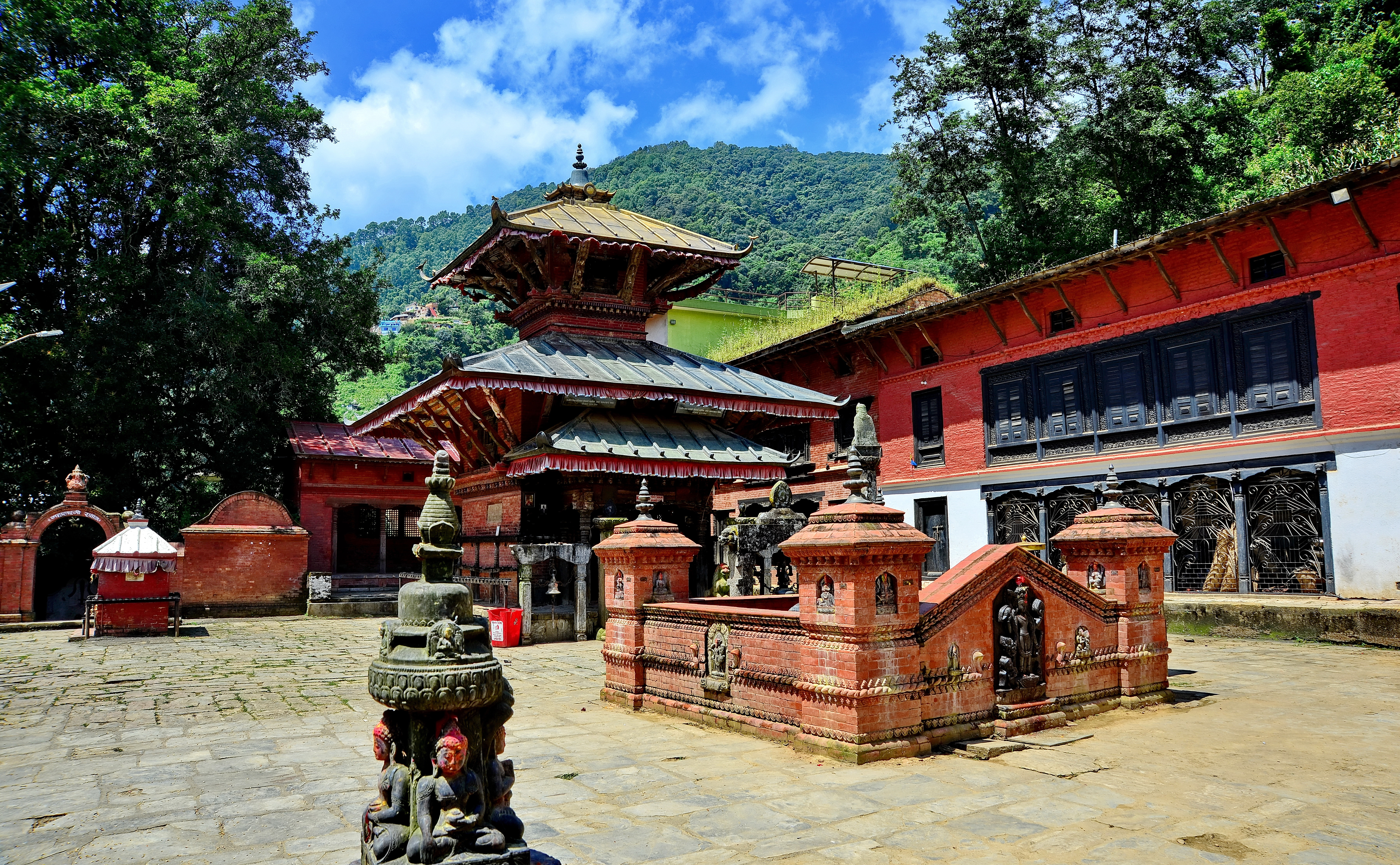

- Location in Nepal

Religion
- Affiliation: Hinduism
- District: Kathmandu
- Deity: Narayana

Location
- Country: Nepal
- Interactive map of KID Temple
- Coordinates: 27.7262°N 85.2515°E

Ichangu Narayan Temple (Nepali: इचंगु नारायण मन्दिर) is a 5th-century Hindu temple located in Kathmandu, Nepal. It is one of the four major Narayan (chaar Narayan) temples of Kathmandu valley alongside Changu Narayan, Bisankhu Narayan and Sheshnarayan. It was built by King Haridutta of the Lichhavi dynasty.

The temple was rebuilt in the 18th century. The temple has two stories and has a pogoda architecture. The courtyard of the temple houses statues of various Hindu deities such as Garudas and Mahalaxmi. The idols were stolen from the temple several times, but they were recovered.
