= Kapali (Newar caste) =

Kapali is one of the Caste of Newar community in Nepal. It is an ancient caste of Nepal. Kapali caste are found in various parts of Nepal. Newar Kapalis predominantly used to possess high tantric power. The Newar people are the historical inhabitants of the Kathmandu Valley and its surrounding areas in Nepal.

== Description ==
Generally, Kapalis of Shiva Gotra are widely found in Nepal. They follow mixed Hinduism as well as Buddhism. They mostly follow Hinduism and consider Shiva as the supreme body whereas Guru Gorakhnath is considered as the supreme deity for their welfare. Kapali are taken as kid of Lord Shiva. Although, in different time period, Kapali have developed their own Tantric system. Kapali plays Myali ( a musical instrument like Flute) which has the immense power to call God in the stone idol. The musical instrument is also capable to make the rainfall from the sky as per Sadhak's power. Kapalis had served as nurse, doctor or delivery person during the Malla Dynasty of Nepal. They were given lands and home near the three Durbar Squares of Kathmandu valley in request by Malla Kings to stay near the palace.

Kapali also known as Darshandhari are Hatha Yogi in Newari traditions.

In every festival of Newar Culture, a person from Kapali caste is called to play Myali in order to perform pooja to activate the deity of the idol. Kapalis, the children of Yogis, also considered as pure as [Kush] are buried because Yogis and Jogis can't be burnt due to their holiness. The term Kapali is used from the very earlier period as earlier as marriage of Sati Devi and Lord Shiva. Here, Shiva as BirBhadra cuts off the arrogant head to Daksha Prajapati [son of Lord Brahma] . Kapala means skull or head. Goddess Kali is also called Kapalini. The Khatvanga used by Buddhist is said to be gift by the Kapali. Khatvanga basically is like stick of skeleton of arm, having mystical power developed by tantra sadhana done by Kapalis in the crematory ground. Bhagwan Matsyanendra Nath used Kapalika tradition mystics.

Predominantly, they are found in Kathmandu Valley (Patan City, Bhaktapur, Kirtipur).

== See also ==
- Culture of Nepal
- Newar caste system
