= Dhyan Govinda Ranjit =

Nepalese politician

Dhyan Govinda Ranjit during Election Campaign in 2008

Dhyan Govinda Ranjit a.k.a. Dhyan Govinda Ranjitkar (Nepali/Nepal Bhasa: ध्यान गोबिन्द रञ्जित) is a Nepalese politician and a leader of Nepali Congress. He is a member of Nepalese constituent assembly/Nepalese Parliament. Ranjit has twice been elected to the Nepalese Constituent Assembly from Kathmandu constituency on two consecutive elections. He is an elected member of Nepali Congress parliamentary party working committee (Nepali: संसदीय दलको कार्यसमिति) representing Province-3 (Nepali: Pradesh-3). He was a representative of Nepali Congress in work editing committee (Nepali:कार्य व्यवस्था परामर्श समिति) . He is the Past President of Kathmandu District Committee of Nepali Congress.

Ranjit has been active in Nepalese politics since the "civil disobidience movement" (bhadra awagya andolan) in 1954 (2014 Bikram Sambat). He was amongst the first group of activists imprisoned in the coup d'état of 1960 (2017 Bikram Sambat) by King Mahendra for advocating democracy and supporting elected Prime Minister, Bishweshwar Prasad Koirala. During King Mahendra's direct rule after coup d'etat of 1960 (1 Poush 2017), he was accused of Sedition (Nepali:राजद्रोह) for trying to establish democratic political system against King's direct autocratic system due to which he was imprisoned for around a decade in various prisons in Nepal and spent many years in exile along with leaders like Bishweshwar Prasad Koirala, Girija Prasad Koirala, Ganesh Man Singh and Krishna Prasad Bhattarai.

== Early life ==
Ranjit was born in Majipat, Kathmandu to Narayan Govinda Ranjit and Mohan Devi Ranjit. He obtained school level education from J.P. High School. He was arrested at a young age of 17 during King's direct rule of Nepal for supporting democracy. In spite of being in and out of prison for most of his life for advocating freedom and democracy in Nepal, he obtained Master of Arts (Political Science) and studied Master of Public Administration and Bachelor of Law.

== Struggle for democracy ==
Ranjit was active to restore democracy in Nepal during entire 30-year period of autocratic rule by Nepalese Monarchy called as Panchayati Regime. He was one of the founders of Nepal Student Union (Nepali:Nepal Bidhyarthi Sangh) and served in various capacity as leader of Nepal Student Union (Nepali:Nepal Bidhyarthi Sangh) and then banned Nepali Congress.

He was one of the main leaders involved in restoration of democracy during king's direct rule in Nepal.

== Imprisonment and exile ==
Ranjit was imprisoned by the partyless Panchayati Government of Nepal for more than ten years for advocating freedom and multi party democracy in Nepal. During the partyless Panchayati Regime (1960–1990), he spent many years in exile in India along with Supreme Leader of Nepali Congress Ganesh Man Singh.

After restoration of democracy, he ran for election for Member of Parliament in 1994 (2051 Bikram Sambat) from Kathmandu Constituency No. 7 on behalf of Nepali Congress.

== Role in Nepalese Constituent Assembly/Nepalese Parliament ==
Ranjit is an elected member of Nepalese Constituent Assembly/Nepalese Parliament. He has been elected to Constituent Assembly for the second time from Kathmandu constituency in November 2013. He was also elected from the same constituency in 2008.

Ranjit was an elected member of the Nepali Congress parliamentary party working committee. He was a representative of Nepali Congress in work editing committee (Nepali: कार्य व्यवस्था परामर्श समिति) of Nepalese Constituent Assembly/Nepalese Parliament, an important committee coordinating all activities of Nepalese Constituent Assembly/Nepalese Parliament. Ranjit represented Nepali Congress in National Interest Preservation Committee, which is a thematic committee of Nepalese Constituent Assembly.

== Social service ==
Ranjit is advisor to numerous social organizations in Nepal. In the past, he has been elected to the executive committee of Nepal Council of World Affairs.

== Other news ==
In November 2013, Ranjit got elected to Constituent Assembly for the second time from Kathmandu.

He was the coordinator of Nepali Congress Mahasamiti preparation committee which successfully carried out preparations for Nepali Congress Mahasamiti meeting held from November 1 to November 3, 2009, in Kathmandu, Nepal. The party has 1,250 representatives in the Mahasamiti, the second powerful body in the party.

He was the chief guest in an interaction programme jointly organized by the Russian Center for Science and Culture and the Nepal Council of World Affairs in February 2009. The interaction programme was titled ‘foreign policy of Russia in the present context’ and marked the 200th anniversary of the diplomatic day of Russia.

On 29 December 2008, he presented a letter of appreciation to Park Young Seok, a Korean mountaineer who has climbed all of the world's 14 mountains above 8,000 metres. The facilitation programme was organized by Nepal Korea Cooperation Council.

He was the chief guest in the programme organized on 16 June 2008 at the Russian Centre of Science and Culture to mark the 45th Anniversary of the Cosmos Flight by the world's first woman cosmonaut Valentina Terehkova (i.e. on June 16, 1963).

In April 2008 he won the Kathmandu-9 seat in the Constituent Assembly election, under the first-past-the-post (FPTP) system.

He was the Coordinator of the Martyrs Day Main Organising Committee 2063 (2007) to mark Martyrs Day in Nepal.

In the past, he served as the head of seven party alliance delegates overseeing the activities of the city.

== See also ==
- Nepali Congress
- Bishweshwar Prasad Koirala
- Ganesh Man Singh
- Krishna Prasad Bhattarai
- Girija Prasad Koirala
- Sher Bahadur Deuba
