= Bhirkot, Gorkha =

Mirkot Gorkha भिरकोट Bhirkot, Gorkha
- Village Development Committee
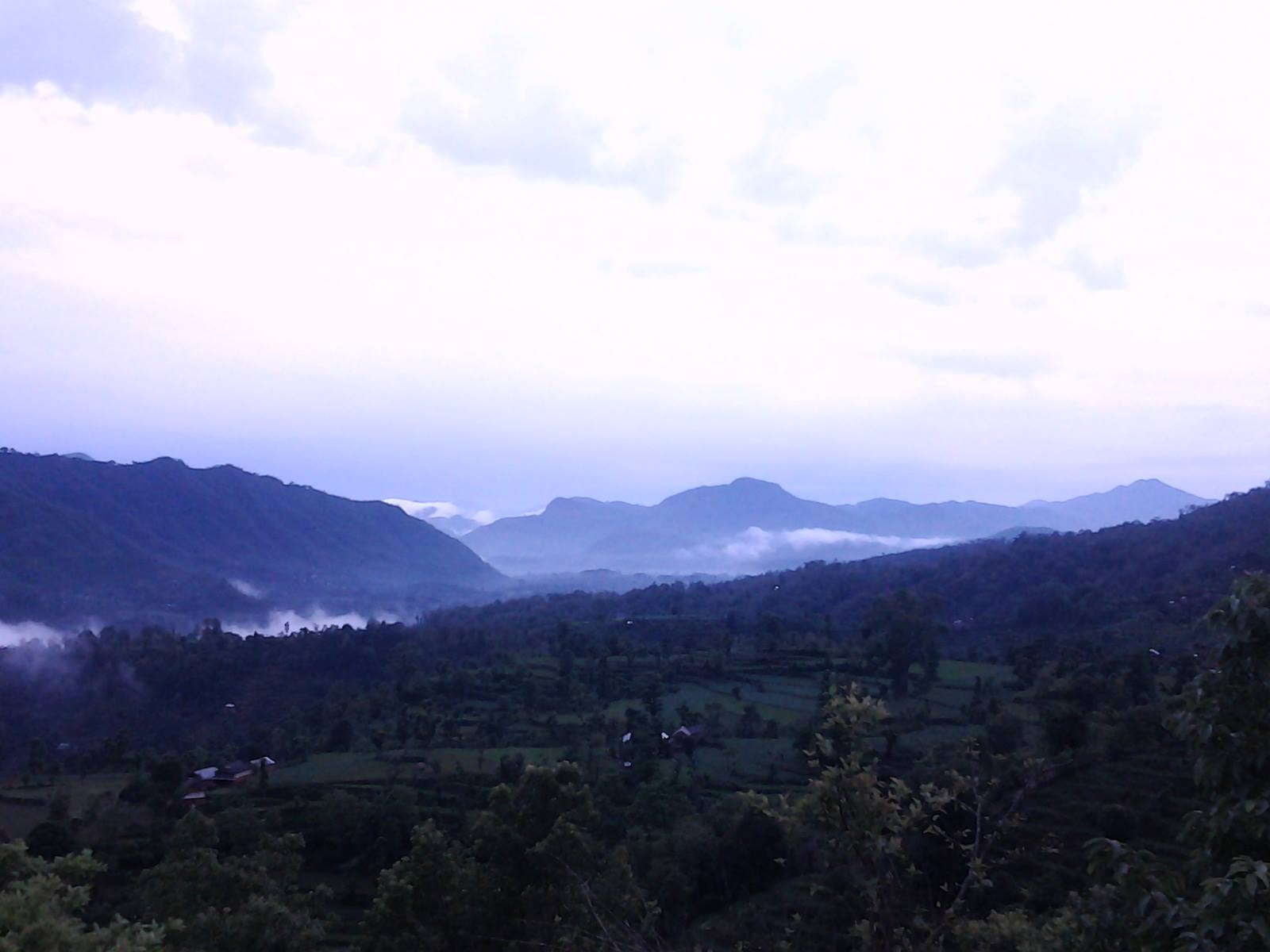

- Location in Nepal Mirkot Gorkha (Nepal)
- Coordinates: 28°0′0″N 84°38′0″E
- Country: Nepal
- Zone: Gandaki Zone
- District: Gorkha District

Population (2011)A populated Place Of Gorkha District.
  - Total: 5,261
- Male 2407 & Female 2854
- Time zone: UTC+5:45 (Nepal Time)
- Postal code: 34000 D.P.O.
- Area code: 064
- भिरकोट: Bhirkot
- Website: www.hamrogorkha.com

Mirkot ( मिरकोट ) is a village development committee in Gorkha District in the Gandaki Zone of northern-central Nepal. It is also known as Bhirkot, Gorkha. It lies on the western side of the headquarters of Gorkha. According to the National Population and Housing Census 2011, it had a population of 5,261 (2,407 male and 2,854 female), and had 1,388 households in the village. Its neighbourhood VDCs are Gaikhur, Dhuwakot, Khoplang, Chyangli, Palumtar, Chhoprak, and Deurali. Cities auch as Kotgadi, Lakang, Mahadev Temple are significant to Mirkot’s background. The central part of Mirkot VDC is called Bagdanda and is where the main office of the VDC and Mirkot Higher Secondary School are located.

•Major villages: Bagdanda, Sanabesi, Sera, Dhaukhola, Supare, Ramche, Kusuntar, Panthini, Lakang, Britti, Tari, Jhahare, Simalgaira, Lazikot, Dharapani, Jogi Dihi etc.

•Major Historical Attractions: Kotgadi, Lakang Kalika, Mahadev Temple, Historical Pond of Lazikot, etc.

•Ethnic Group: People are mainly from Brahamin, Kchetri, Gurung, Dalit, Magar, Lama, Tamang, other community.
