= Mirkot =

Mirkot Gorkha मिरकोट गोरखा
- Village Development Committee
- A hilly view of Mirkot.

- Location in Nepal Mirkot Gorkha (Nepal)
- Coordinates: 28°0′0″N 84°38′0″E
- Country: Nepal
- Region: Western
- District: Gorkha District

Population (2011)A populated Place Of Gorkha District.
  - Total: 5,261
- Male 2407 & Female 2854
- Time zone: UTC+5:45 (Nepal Time)
- Postal code: 34000 D.P.O.
- Area code: 064
- मिरकोट: Mirkot
- Website: www.hamrogorkha.com

Mirkot ( मिरकोट ) was a village development committee in Gorkha District in the Gandaki Zone of northern-central Nepal. It lied on the western side of the headquarters of Gorkha. According to the National Population and Housing Census 2011, it had a population of 5261 (2407 male and 2854 female), and had 1388 households in the village.

Its neighbourhood VDCs were Gaikhur, Dhuwakot, Khoplang, Chyangli, Palumtar, Chhoprak and Deurali. The central part of Mirkot VDC was the village of Bagdanda, where the main office of the VDC and Mirkot Higher Secondary School were located.

The major villages in the area included Bagdanda, Sanabesi, Sera, Dhaukhola, Supare, Ramche, Kusuntar, Panthini, Lakang, Britti, Moho Riya, Jhahare, Simalgaira, Lajikot, Dharapani, Jogi Dihi, and Tari. Attractions included Kotgadi, Lakang Kalika, Mahadev Temple, and the Historical Pond of Lazikot. Its population were mainly from Brahmin, Chhetri, Gurung, Dalit, Magar, Lama, and Tamang.

The village development committee structure was dissolved on 10 March 2017 to be replaced by gaunpalika.

== Gallery ==
Kotgadhi.

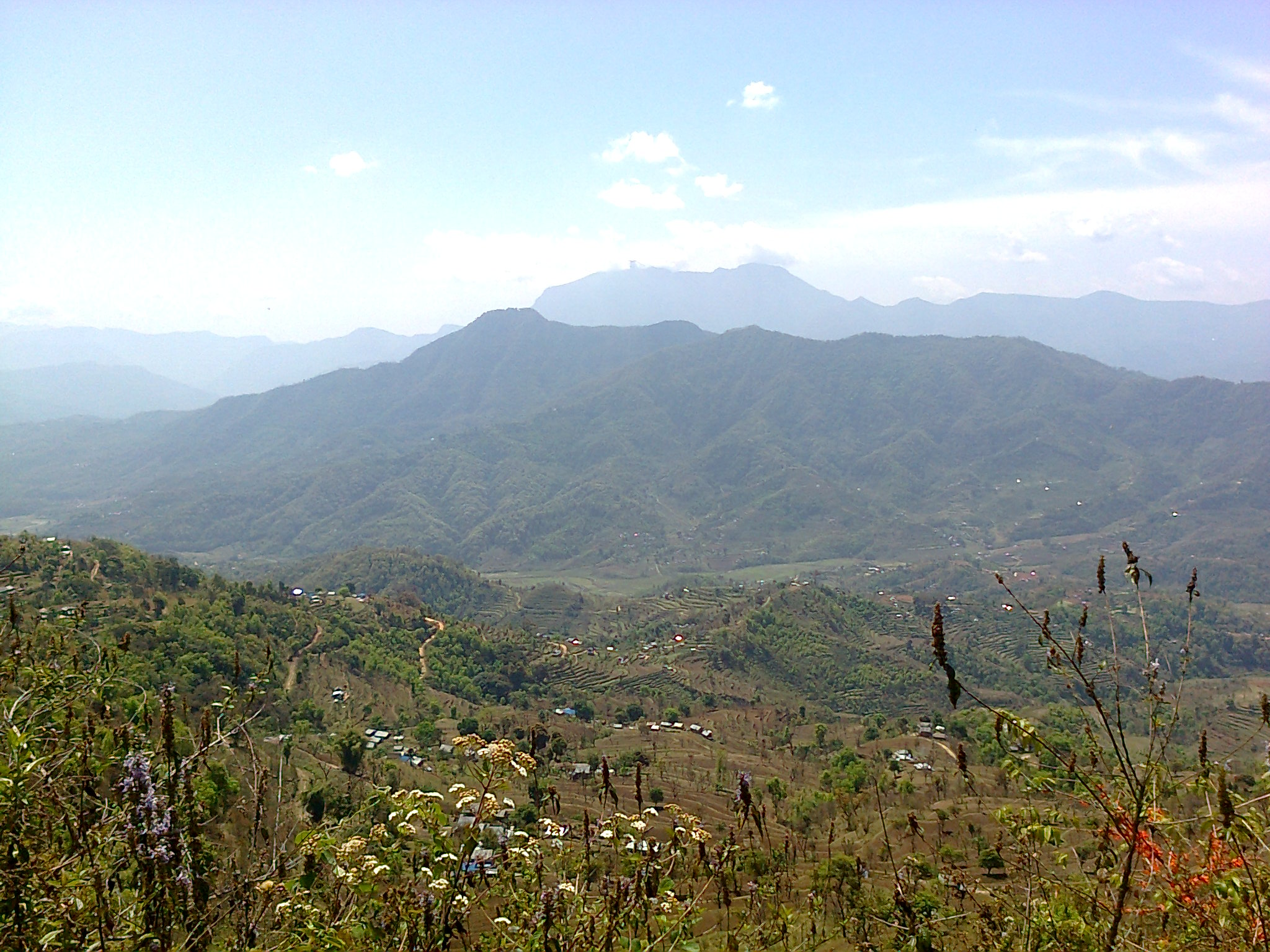
Mirkot Village View.

A Village of Mirkot VDC.

Mirkot School.

Mahadev Temple, Mirkot.

Lakang Kalika
