= Ram Narayan Bidari =

Nepali politician

Member of Rastriya Sabha
- In office 10 March 2018 – 3 March 2022
- President: Bidya Devi Bhandari
- Prime Minister: Pushpa Kamal Dahal

Personal details
- Party: CPN (Maoist Centre)
- Other political affiliations: CPN (UML); Nepal Communist Party
- Profession: Lawyer

Ram Narayan Bidari is a Nepali politician. He is a member of the constitutional assembly and also a former member of National Assembly. He used to be a member of Nepal Communist Party (Maoist Center). After the party's unification with CPN UML, he remained a member of the resulting Nepal Communist Party (NCP). He was previously a member of parliament from Maoist Center and was a member of the House Impeachment Recommendations Committee. He was picked as member and secretary to the 14-member Parliamentary Board by his party in 2016.

Bidari is a senior advocate in Civil and Criminal law. He is based in Kathmandu. He has an education of up to Bachelor of Laws. He is known for speaking out when various actions from the executive and legislature contravene procedures or laws.

== Views ==
In August 2016, Bidari spoke in support of Chief of the Commission for the Investigation of Abuse of Authority, Lokman Singh Karki, after an impeachment discussion was launched by Nepali Congress lawmakers following the allegations by Dr. Govinda K.C. that Karki was promoting corruption in the Nepali medical sector.

In May 2017, as a member of the House Impeachment Committee, he alleged that his signature, collected for a different purpose, was being used to launch impeachment proceedings against Chief Justice Sushila Karki. He suggested he would take no further action on the matter only if it was done under the explicit direction of party chair Pushpa Kamal Dahal.

He was one of the first lawmakers to raise the issue of regulating social media in Nepal. In June 2019, the "IT Bill" drafted with his involvement was introduced. The bill was criticised for proposing harsh penalties for actions related to internet use that are generally protected by freedom of speech.

In August 2018, Bidari was elected unopposed to Delegated Management and Government Assurance Committee of the National Assembly.

In July 2019, Bidari said that even ministries were unaware of all the laws they implemented. As such the parliament committee he chairs directed all ministries and other government affiliates to submit "delegate laws" or by-laws. He expressed concern over the lack of certainty that all government bodies had appropriate delegate laws and that no one had verified that all such laws were compliant with their parental laws. He suggested that delegate laws were created in a whim without verifying compliance. The same month, Bidari criticised the government (his own party) for failing to manage disasters effectively even though they were aware that monsoon causes devastation every year.

In May 2019, Bidari was one of the few lawmakers to support Finance minister Yubaraj Khatiwada's proposal to discontinue budgetary allocations to MP's offices for their discretionary investment in small projects in their constituencies; instead favouring accumulation of the capital at the executive branch for investment in national level projects. Bidari opposed such pork-barrel funds, opining that legislators should not wade into executive matters with such programs. That same month, he joined the opposition to the "Passport Bill" put forward by his own party, alleging that the provision to deny passports to citizens facing a criminal charge that has not yet been adjudicated, was "flawed". The Bill was returned to the House by the President following the criticism.
