= Minister of Home Affairs (Nepal) =

Head of the Ministry of Home Affairs

- गृहमन्त्री
- Emblem of Nepal

- Flag of Nepal
- Incumbent; Sudan Gurung since 9 June 2026
- Ministry of Home Affairs
- Style: His Excellency
- Member of: Council of Ministers
- Reports to: Prime Minister
- Appointer: The President
- Inaugural holder: B. P. Koirala
- Formation: 21 February 1951; 75 years ago
- First holder: Rameshowe sherestha

The Minister of Home Affairs (Nepali: गृहमन्त्री, romanized: Gṛha Mantrī; or simply, the Home Minister) is the head of the Ministry of Home Affairs of the Government of Nepal. One of the senior-most officers in the Federal Cabinet, the chief responsibility of the home minister is the maintenance of Nepal's internal security; the country's large police force comes under its jurisdiction.

== List of ministers of home affairs ==
This is a list of former ministers of home affairs since 1991:

#	Name	Term of office			Prime Minister	Minister's party
1	Sher Bahadur Deuba	29 May 1991	30 November 1994	3 years, 185 days	Girija Prasad Koirala	Nepali Congress
2	K. P. Sharma Oli	30 November 1994	12 September 1995	286 days	Man Mohan Adhikari	CPN (UML)
3	Khum Bahadur Khadka	12 September 1995	12 March 1997	1 year, 181 days	Sher Bahadur Deuba	Nepali Congress
4	Bam Dev Gautam	12 March 1997	7 October 1997	209 days	Lokendra Bahadur Chand	CPN (UML)
5	Budhhiman Tamang	27 October 1997	3 December 1997	37 days	Surya Bahadur Thapa	RPP
(3)	Khum Bahadur Khadka	3 December 1997	15 April 1998	133 days	Surya Bahadur Thapa	Nepali Congress
6	Govinda Raj Joshi	21 April 1998	25 December 1998	248 days	Girija Prasad Koirala	Nepali Congress
6	Govinda Raj Joshi	25 December 1998	31 May 1999	157 days	Girija Prasad Koirala	Nepali Congress
7	Purna Bahadur Khadka	30 June 1999	22 March 2000	266 days	Krishna Prasad Bhattarai	Nepali Congress
(6)	Govinda Raj Joshi	22 March 2000	29 September 2000	191 days	Girija Prasad Koirala	Nepali Congress
8	Ram Chandra Paudel	29 September 2000	26 July 2001	300 days	Girija Prasad Koirala	Nepali Congress
(3)	Khum Bahadur Khadka	26 July 2001	4 October 2002	1 year, 70 days	Sher Bahadur Deuba	Nepali Congress
9	Dharma Bahadur Thapa	11 October 2002	11 April 2003	182 days	Lokendra Bahadur Chand	Independent
10	Badri Prasad Mandal	11 April 2003	5 June 2003	55 days	Lokendra Bahadur Chand	Nepal Sadbhawana Party
11	Kamal Thapa	5 June 2003	10 June 2004	1 year, 5 days	Surya Bahadur Thapa	RPP
(7)	Purna Bahadur Khadka	5 July 2004	1 February 2005	211 days	Sher Bahadur Deuba	Nepali Congress (Democratic)
12	Krishna Prasad Sitaula	29 April 2006	1 April 2007	337 days	Girija Prasad Koirala	Nepali Congress
12	Krishna Prasad Sitaula	1 April 2007	18 August 2008	1 year, 139 days	Girija Prasad Koirala	Nepali Congress
(4)	Bam Dev Gautam	18 August 2008	25 May 2009	280 days	Pushpa Kamal Dahal	CPN (UML)
13	Bhim Bahadur Rawal	25 May 2009	6 February 2011	1 year, 257 days	Madhav Kumar Nepal	CPN (UML)
14	Krishna Bahadur Mahara	6 February 2011	29 August 2011	204 days	Jhala Nath Khanal	Maoist Centre
15	Bijay Kumar Gachhadar	4 September 2011	14 March 2013	1 year, 191 days	Baburam Bhattarai	MJFN (L)
16	Madhav Ghimire	14 March 2013	11 February 2014	334 days	Khil Raj Regmi	Independent
(4)	Bam Dev Gautam	25 February 2014	12 October 2015	1 year, 229 days	Sushil Koirala	CPN (UML)
17	Shakti Bahadur Basnet	19 October 2015	4 August 2016	290 days	KP Sharma Oli	Maoist Centre
18	Bimalendra Nidhi	4 August 2016	7 June 2017	307 days	Pushpa Kamal Dahal	Nepali Congress
19	Janardan Sharma	7 June 2017	17 October 2017	132 days	Sher Bahadur Deuba	Maoist Centre
20	Ram Bahadur Thapa	26 February 2018 (Note: Became member of NCP after merger of CPN(UML) and CPN(MC) on 17 May 2018)	20 May 2021	3 years, 83 days	KP Sharma Oli	Maoist Centre
21	Khagaraj Adhikari	10 June 2021	22 June 2021	12 days	KP Sharma Oli	CPN (UML)
22	Bishnu Prasad Paudel	24 June 2021	13 July 2021	19 days	KP Sharma Oli	CPN (UML)
24	Bal Krishna Khand	13 July 2021	26 December 2022	1 year, 166 days	Sher Bahadur Deuba	Nepali Congress
23	Rabi Lamichhane	26 December 2022	27 January 2023	32 days	Pushpa Kamal Dahal	RSP
24	Narayan Kaji Shrestha	31 March 2023	4 March 2024	339 days	Pushpa Kamal Dahal	Maoist Centre
(23)	Rabi Lamichhane	6 March 2024	15 July 2024	131 days	Pushpa Kamal Dahal	RSP
25	Ramesh Lekhak	15 July 2024	8 September 2025	1 year, 55 days	KP Sharma Oli	Nepali Congress
26	Om Prakash Aryal	15 September 2025	27 March 2026	193 days	Sushila Karki	Independent
27	Sudan Gurung	27 March 2026	22 April 2026	26 days	Balendra Shah	RSP
(27)	Sudan Gurung	9 June 2026	Incumbent	133 days	Balendra Shah	RSP
