= Rajendra Bajgain =

Nepalese politician

- राजेन्द्र बजगाईं

Member of the House of Representatives
- In office 22 December 2022 – 12 September 2025
- Preceded by: Hari Raj Adhikari
- Succeeded by: Sudan Gurung
- Constituency: Gorkha 1

Personal details
- Born: 10 May 1973 (age 52) Gorkha District
- Party: Nepali Congress
- Spouse: Pooja Paudel
- Parent: Thir Prasad Bajgain (father)

Rajendra Bajgain (Nepali: राजेन्द्र बजगाईं) is a Nepalese politician, belonging to the Nepali Congress who served as a member of the 2nd Federal Parliament of Nepal. In the 2022 Nepalese general election, he won the election from Gorkha 1 (constituency).
