= Om Prakash Aryal =

Nepali politician

- ओम प्रकाश आर्यल

Minister of Home Affairs
- In office 15 September 2025 – 26 March 2026
- President: Ram Chandra Poudel
- Prime Minister: Sushila Karki
- Preceded by: Ramesh Lekhak
- Succeeded by: Sudan Gurung

Minister of Law, Justice and Parliamentary Affairs of Nepal
- In office 15 September 2025 – 22 September 2025
- President: Ram Chandra Poudel
- Prime Minister: Sushila Karki
- Preceded by: Ajay Chaurasiya
- Succeeded by: Anil Kumar Sinha

Personal details
- Born: January 1, 1976 (age 50) Amarpur village, Gulmi District, Kingdom of Nepal
- Citizenship: Nepali
- Profession: Advocate; Politician

Om Prakash Aryal is a Nepalese lawyer and senior advocate known for his public interest litigations. He has also served as a legal advisor to Kathmandu Metropolitan City. Aryal was appointed Minister for Home Affairs in the interim government led by Prime Minister Sushila Karki in 2025.

== Early life and education ==
Om Prakash Aryal was born around 1976 in Amarpur village, Gulmi District, western Nepal. Aryal grew up in a modest family. His grandfather was a junior judicial officia. His father was a retired Indian Army soldier. Aryal attended a local public school, which often lacked resources. At the time, Nepal was under a monarchy with the Panchayat system, limiting freedoms. In 1995, Aryal moved to Kathmandu, Nepal's capital, aiming to study music at Ratna Rajya Campus. Music was his first passion however, he failed the English test for admission, Next to the music campus was Nepal Law Campus, part of Tribhuvan University. Aryal enrolled there to study law. Tribhuvan University, Nepal's oldest and largest, offers degrees in many fields. Aryal earned his law degree, learning about the constitution, crimes, and rights, and how courts function.

== Career ==
=== Supreme Court of Nepal ===
After graduating, Aryal became a Supreme Court advocate, allowing him to argue in Nepal's highest court. His early work included risky cases during the Maoist insurgency (1996–2006), when rebels fought the government, and many people disappeared. Aryal filed habeas corpus petitions, court orders ensuring lawful detention. He also challenged state benefits for former rulers in areas like Bajhang and Mustang. Though the court rejected these, his bold approach stood out. During Popular Movement-II in 2006, he worked at the National Human Rights Commission (NHRC), monitoring rights abuses and witnessing government brutality, including by official Lokman Singh Karki.

==== Notable Cases ====
Aryal is known for landmark cases. One major case was against Lokman Singh Karki's 2013 appointment to the Commission for the Investigation of Abuse of Authority (CIAA), which fights corruption. Aryal argued Karki lacked moral integrity, citing past reports. After years, the Supreme Court suspended Karki in 2016, leading to his impeachment. Another case was the Giribandhu Tea Estate land dispute, where Aryal sought contempt action in 2025 for non-compliance with court orders. He also opposed a Chief Justice-led government in 2013.

=== Appointment as Home Minister ===
Aryal was appointed as the Minister for Home Affairs and Minister for Law, Justice and Parliamentary Affairs in the interim government led by Prime Minister Sushila Karki on 15 September 2025. His selection followed widespread youth-led protests that led to the fall of the previous government. Reports described him as a non-partisan figure with a record of integrity and public interest litigation, particularly his legal challenges against corruption and abuse of authority.

==== Notable decisions as Home Minister ====
As Minister for Home Affairs (and Law, Justice & Parliamentary Affairs) from 15 September 2025, Aryal made several key decisions early in his tenure:

- He ordered the withdrawal of police personnel and security escorts assigned beyond legal limits to politicians, former officials, and bureaucrats, stating that security resources must not be misused for personal or political benefit.
- He initiated investigations into the deaths of protesters during the 2025 “Gen Z” movement, calling for accountability within law enforcement agencies.
- He emphasized police modernization and reforms, prioritizing transparency, professionalism, and respect for human rights within security agencies.
