= Palungtar =

Palungtar पालुङटार
- Municipality
- Location in Nepal Palungtar (Nepal)
- Coordinates: 28.05°N 84.50°E
- Country: Nepal
- Province: Gandaki Province
- District: Gorkha District

Government
  - Mayor: Bibas Chintan (NCP)
  - Deputy Mayor: Bandana Pandey (NCP)

Population (2011 Nepal census)
  - Total: 38,174
- Time zone: UTC+5:45 (NST)
- Postal code: 3401
- Area code: 064
- Website: palungtarmun.gov.np

Palungtar is a municipality in Gorkha District in Gandaki Province, central Nepal. It is made up of the seven former Village Development Committees Aanppipal, Chyangli, Dhuwakot, Gaikhur, Khoplang, Mirkot and Palumtar. It lies on the bank of Marshyangdi River. The Government of Nepal plans to make Palungtar the country's first Smart City. At the time of the 2011 Nepal census it had a population of 38,174 people living in 9,924 individual households.

== Demographics ==
At the time of the 2011 Nepal census, Palungtar Municipality had a population of 38,244. Of these, 89.9% spoke Nepali, 4.8% Tamang, 1.5% Magar, 1.3% Gurung, 1.1% Newar, 0.6% Kumhali, 0.5% Urdu, 0.1% Bhojpuri and 0.1% other languages as their first language.

In terms of ethnicity/caste, 16.3% were Chhetri, 13.4% Hill Brahmin, 10.3% Kumal, 10.2% Sarki, 9.0% Newar, 8.5% Magar, 7.6% Tamang, 6.7% Kami, 5.0% Gurung, 4.5% Damai/Dholi, 3.9% Sanyasi/Dasnami, 1.6% Gharti/Bhujel, 0.8% Musalman, 0.6% Thakuri, 0.5% Brahmu/Baramo, 0.2% Gaine, 0.1% Badi, 0.1% Darai, 0.1% Ghale, 0.1% Kamar, 0.1% Majhi, 0.1% Rai and 0.2% others.

In terms of religion, 86.3% were Hindu, 7.0% Buddhist, 5.8% Christian, 0.8% Muslim and 0.1% others.

In terms of literacy, 69.2% could both read and write, 2.1% could read but not write and 28.7% could neither read nor write.

== Transportation ==
Palungtar Airport is an out-of-service airport that lies in Palungtar.
