= Gaikhur =

Gaikhur गाईखुर
- Former Village development committee
- Location in Nepal Gaikhur (Nepal)
- Coordinates: 28.02°N 84.48°E
- Country: Nepal
- Province: Gandaki Province
- District: Gorkha District

Population (1991)
  - Total: 4,793
- Time zone: UTC+5:45 (Nepal Time)
- Name meaning: Gaikhur: gai = "cow" and khur = "foot". A temple located in this village has a cow's footsteps on stone. Therefore, this village is named as "cow's footsteps", or Gaikhur.

Gaikhur is a former village development committee currently located in Palungtar municipality of Gorkha District in the Gandaki Province (previously Gandaki Zone) of northern-central Nepal. At the time of the 1991 Nepal census it had a population of 4,793 and had 948 houses in the town. Mirkot, Palungtar, Khoplang, Dhuwakot were the neighbouring VDCs of Gaikhur. Gaikhur lies on the western side of Gorkha Bazar.

It is the birthplace of Hit Raj Pandey, who is a local and development minister under the current government.
