= Sudan Gurung =

Home Minister of Nepal

- सुधन गुरुङ

Minister of Home Affairs
- Incumbent
- Assumed office 9 June 2026
- President: Ram Chandra Paudel
- Prime Minister: Balendra Shah
- Preceded by: Balendra Shah
- In office 27 March 2026 – 22 April 2026
- President: Ram Chandra Paudel
- Prime Minister: Balendra Shah
- Preceded by: Om Prakash Aryal
- Succeeded by: Balendra Shah

Member of the House of Representatives
- Incumbent
- Assumed office 26 March 2026
- Preceded by: Rajendra Bajgain
- Constituency: Gorkha 1

Personal details
- Born: Sudhan Gurung; 18 July 1987 (age 39) Gorkha, Nepal
- Party: Rastriya Swatantra Party (since 2026)
- Parent: Dil Bahadur Gurung (father)
- Education: Kalika Gurukul School (SLC)
- Profession: Politician; DJ; social activist; entrepreneur

Sudan Gurung (Note: Nepali: सुधन गुरुङ, romanized: Sūdan Gūrung, pronounced [/ˈsu.dʱʌn ɡu.ruŋ/], simple pronunciation: SOO-dhan goo-RUNG) (born 18 July 1987) is a Nepalese politician, social activist, and entrepreneur who has served as the Minister of Home Affairs of Nepal since 9 June 2026. He previously held the same office from 27 March 2026 to 22 April 2026, temporarily resigning after controversy over financial conduct on moral grounds to facilitate investigation. He is a member of parliament from Gorkha 1. He is also the founder and coordinator of the non-governmental organization Hami Nepal.

He emerged as one of the leaders of the Gen Z movement in the aftermath of the 2025 Nepalese Gen Z protests. He participated in extensive negotiations with the President and the Chief of the Army staff Ashok Raj Sigdel, which led to finalisation of former Chief Justice Sushila Karki as interim prime minister and dissolution of parliament, paving the way for early election. On the night of 14 September 2025, Gurung led protests against interim prime minister Karki demanding her resignation, alleging that she was expanding her cabinet without consultation.

Gurung's ideological beliefs include anti-corruption measures, secularism, systemic reform and empowerment of the new generation. Gurung does not follow any particular religion and instead promotes the "religion of humanity" philosophical view.

He ran in the 2026 Nepalese general election with the Rastriya Swatantra Party, winning a parliamentary seat from constituency Gorkha 1.

== Early life and education ==
Sudan Gurung was born on 18 July 1987 in Chumanuwri Rural Municipality, located in the northern part of the Gorkha District, he was raised in a modest family. His father, Dil Bahadur Gurung is from the same region. Sudhan later moved to Chitwan District, where he was raised by his grandmother, and his grandfather, Ramsal Gurung.

After completing his School Leaving Certificate (S.L.C.) from Kalika Gurukul Secondary English Boarding School in Chitwan, he enrolled in A-Levels at Kathmandu's Malpi International School. However, he could not complete his studies after the second year of A-Levels.

== Early career ==
Sudhan spent a significant part of his life in Kathmandu. After moving from Chitwan to Kathmandu, his first job was in a call centre as a employee. After that, he began working as a Disc jockey (DJ) and gained recognition under the name DJ Sudhan in Thamel.

In 2012, Sudhan established his own nightclub, OMG Club, in collaboration with partners older than him. Through this business, he became known for introducing theme-based parties in Thamel, which not only brought him financial success but also helped him build connections with influential and high-ranking individuals, including the Nepalese gangster Dinesh Adhikari, commonly known as Chari Don.

== Political activism ==
=== Initial activism ===
Gurung's entry into activism was sparked by the devastating 2015 Nepal earthquake, which killed nearly 9,000 people and left Nepal in crisis. A former DJ, he experienced a life-changing moment when a child died in his arms during the disaster. He later recalled, "A child died in my arms; I'll never forget that moment." The experience led him to shift his focus from nightlife to humanitarian and social work.

In the earthquake's immediate aftermath, Gurung used social media to issue an urgent appeal for help. The call quickly mobilized nearly 200 volunteers who, despite lacking formal training, stepped forward to assist overwhelmed hospitals. He became a recognizable figure at Bir Hospital, where he coordinated around 1,000 volunteers and distributed essential supplies to support doctors and patients during the influx of casualties. Volunteers under his coordination also delivered relief materials, including rice, to rural villages and provided temporary shelter by pitching tents in school grounds.

=== 2025 Gen Z protests ===
Sudan Gurung emerged as a prominent volunteer during the 2025 Nepalese Gen Z protests, a youth-led movement against corruption, nepotism, and the government's ban on several social media platforms. As the founder of Hami Nepal, he and his team initially provided free drinking water and other assistance to protesters. Through online platforms such as TikTok, he helped coordinate protestors across Kathmandu and other cities, sharing information on protest activities and safety guidelines. Hami Nepal also created a Discord server that later became a platform for public discussions and voting during the selection of the interim prime minister.

The protests intensified on 8 September 2025. Protestors had already gathered outside the former building of Parliament of Nepal in Baneshwor when security forces began using tear gas and water cannons to disperse the crowds. After some protesters turned violent, damaging property and attempting to enter the Parliament, the Armed Police Force (APF) escalated its initial response by using rubber bullets and later live ammunition. The clashes left at least 19 people dead and hundreds injured. During the unrest, Gurung and members of Hami Nepal were seen assisting injured protesters and transporting them to nearby hospitals for treatment.

== Political career ==
His first instance of leadership in a wider context of protest was in early 2025, when he had become the head of a protest held at B. P. Koirala Institute of Health Sciences, where he demanded more transparency in the institution.

During and in the aftermath of the 2025 Nepalese Gen-Z protests, he assumed a role of a key player and leader of the movement. He also participated in negotiations with Ashok Raj Sigdel, which led to finalisation of former Chief Justice Sushila Karki as interim prime minister and dissolution of parliament, paving the way for early elections.

He has expressed his intention of running in the 2026 Nepalese general election in a political group rather than an independent candidate, justifying such decision as a strategy. He also warned that the elections would be obstructed if the needs of Generation Z were not met.

On the night of 14 September 2025, Gurung led protests against interim prime minister Karki demanding her resignation, alleging that she was expanding her cabinet without consultation. On 24 November 2025 he led a group of Gen-Zs to protest after failing to meet the Nepali Prime Minister and not being able to submit a complaint regarding the assignment of relatives to political posts within the government. He protested such demands even after that, on 26 November 2025. On 18 January 2026 he joined the Rastriya Swatantra Party, running on their behalf in Gorkha 1 constituency. He won the seat, receiving 29,896 votes. On 27 March 2026, he was appointed as the Home Minister of Nepal by the government led by Prime Minister Balen Shah. On 22 April 2026, he resigned from his post, citing moral responsibility due to rising controversy and public pressure. Following his resignation, an investigation committee was formed by the government to examine the allegations. The investigation found nothing unusual, and he was reappointed on 9 June 2026.

== Hami Nepal ==
In 2020, Sudhan Gurung founded Hami Nepal, a non-governmental organization established during the COVID-19 pandemic as a community-based emergency response initiative. The organization was formally registered in 2020 and developed as a youth-led, non-partisan platform focused on direct relief and civic engagement.

Hami Nepal has received support and association from various public figures, including ophthalmologist Dr. Sanduk Ruit and Miss Universe Nepal 2018 Manita Devkota, who has served as a goodwill ambassador. Other Nepali public personalities have also participated in its relief and advocacy efforts.

The organization has been involved in humanitarian activities, including assistance during the 2021 floods in Nepal and contributing aid to international disaster responses, such as the 2023 Turkey–Syria earthquakes. It has also received recognition through awards for its COVID-19 and community relief efforts.

== Ideology ==
Gurung emphasized that his ideological beliefs include a will for systemic reform, anti-corruption measures, secularism, and empowerment of the new generation. Gurung does not follow any particular religion and instead promotes the "religion of humanity" philosophical view.

== See also ==
- 2025 Nepalese Gen Z protests
- 2026 Nepalese General Election
- Minister of Home Affairs (Nepal)
- Ministry of Home Affairs (Nepal)
- List of ministries of Nepal
