= Aanppipal =

Place in Nepal

Amppipal आँपपीपल
- Former Palungtar Municipality
- Location in Nepal Amppipal (Nepal)
- Coordinates: 28°4′12″N 84°32′24″E
- Country: Nepal
- Province: Gandaki Province
- District: Gorkha District

Population (1991)
  - Total: 5,124
- Time zone: UTC+5:45 (Nepal Time)

Amppipal is a former village development committee currently located in Palungtar municipality of Gorkha District in the Gandaki Province (previously Gandaki Zone) of northern-central Nepal. At the time of the 1991 Nepal census it had a population of 5,124 and had 1060 houses in the town. The small village Amppipal belongs to this VDC.
