= Bhirkot =

Bhirkot may refer to:

- Bhirkot, Gorkha, Nepal
- Bhirkot, Tanahu, Nepal
- Bhirkot, Janakpur, Nepal
- Bhirkot Municipality, Syangja, Nepal
