= Narayan Kaji Shrestha =

Nepali politician

Honourable Narayan Kaji Shrestha MP
- नारायणकाजी श्रेष्ठ

Deputy Prime Minister of Nepal
- In office 26 December 2022 – 15 July 2024
- President: Bidhya Devi Bhandari; Ram Chandra Poudel
- Prime Minister: Pushpa Kamal Dahal
- Vice President: Nanda Kishor Pun; Ram Sahaya Yadav
- Preceded by: Raghubir Mahaseth; Rajendra Mahato
- Succeeded by: Prakash Man Singh; Bishnu Prasad Paudel
- In office 4 September 2011 – 14 March 2013
- President: Ram Baran Yadav
- Prime Minister: Baburam Bhattarai
- Vice President: Parmanand Jha
- Preceded by: Upendra Yadav; Krishna Bahadur Mahara
- Succeeded by: Prakash Man Singh; Bam Dev Gautam

Minister of Foreign Affairs
- In office 6 March 2024 – 15 July 2024
- President: Ram Chandra Poudel
- Prime Minister: Pushpa Kamal Dahal
- Preceded by: Narayan Prakash Saud
- Succeeded by: Arzu Rana Deuba
- In office 4 September 2011 – 14 March 2013
- President: Ram Baran Yadav
- Prime Minister: Baburam Bhattarai
- Preceded by: Sujata Koirala
- Succeeded by: Ishwor Pokhrel

Minister of Home Affairs
- In office 31 March 2023 – 4 March 2024
- President: Ram Chandra Poudel
- Prime Minister: Puspa Kamal Dahal
- Preceded by: Rabi Lamichhane
- Succeeded by: Rabi Lamichhane
- In office 6 August 2011 – 29 August 2011
- President: Ram Baran Yadav
- Prime Minister: Jhala Nath Khanal
- Preceded by: Krishna Bahadur Mahara
- Succeeded by: Bijay Kumar Gachhadar

Minister of Physical Infrastructure and Transportation
- In office 26 December 2022 – 31 March 2023
- President: Bidya Devi Bhandari
- Prime Minister: Pushpa Kamal Dahal
- Preceded by: Mohammad Estiyak Rai
- Succeeded by: Prakash Jwala

Member of the Parliament, Rastriya Sabha
- Incumbent
- Assumed office 4 March 2023
- Preceded by: Surendra Raj Pandey
- Constituency: Gandaki Province

Personal details
- Party: CPN (Maoist Centre)
- Spouse: Unmarried

Narayan Kaji Shrestha (Nepali: नारायणकाजी श्रेष्ठ), alias Prakash, is a Nepali communist politician. He has been affiliated with a number of communist parties throughout his political career, holding leadership positions. He was a freedom fighter for the democratic movement to abolish the Panchayat system in the 1980s. He remained in the political mainstream during the Maoist civil war and acted as a mediator. After the peaceful settlement of the conflict, he formally joined the Maoist party and has held important political positions since 2008. He has held the offices of the Deputy prime minister of Nepal, Home minister, foreign minister, cabinet spokesperson, Member of Constituent Assembly and Member of Parliament, among others and currently serve as the home minister.

== Early life ==
Narayan Kaji Shrestha was born in Jaubari village of Gorkha and holds a master's degree in public administration. He edited the weekly paper "Mulankyan", "Garjan" and "Janamat". He was a mathematics lecturer in the 1980s at Siddhartha Vanasthali Institute.

== Political career ==
He joined Nepal's communist movement in 1980. He was a second rung leader in the CPN-Unity Centre before its major leaders formed CPN-Maoist and opted for an armed rebellion in 1996. He, however, did not join the rebellion on the grounds of working policy but helped it from outside while continuing with his peaceful political activities despite being underground as general secretary of the Unity Centre. Prakash fell away from Prachanda after the CPN-Unity Centre decided to wage an armed revolt in 1996. Addressing his first public function, Prakash said the road to republic was still full of obstacles and that all forces that believe in democratic republic, should unite.

He played a role in bringing the seven parties and CPN-Maoist together in creating the 12-point Understanding for the democracy movement in mid-April 2006. The movement culminated into a success with the king agreeing to hand over power to the seven parties.

In July 2008, he became a nominated Constituent Assembly member, representing Janamorcha Nepal. His party 'Unity Center, Masal' united with NCP Maoist on January 13, 2009. Prakash became the deputy leader of the parliamentary party of Unified Maoist. After that, Prakash got major responsibilities in the unified Nepal communist party, Maoist. He was given control of the Parliamentary and governmental procedures before he was made the deputy leader of the Unified Maoist in the parliament.

On 2 August 2011, Shrestha was sworn in as Deputy Prime Minister and Home Minister in the final cabinet expansion of the Jhalanath Khanal's (CPN-UML) led government. After Prime Minister Khanal's resignation on 14 August 2011, he remained in those positions in an acting capacity. On 4 September, he was sworn in as Deputy Prime Minister and Foreign Minister in the new Unified Communist Party of Nepal (Maoist) coalition government led by Prime Minister Dr. Baburam Bhattarai. On 7 September 2011, he was appointed official government spokesman. From 19–26 September 2011, he participated in the United Nations General Assembly in New York.

== Premiership as Home Minister ==
In 2023, Narayan Kaji Shrestha made a notable impact during his tenure as Nepal's Home Minister by reopening and initiating investigations into several historic and high-profile cases. These included the Bhutanese refugee scam, a controversial issue involving the illegal settlement and exploitation of refugees; the Lalita Niwas land grab case, involving disputed ownership of public property; the 62 kg gold smuggling case, widely known as the Sunkanda case, which exposed deep-rooted corruption and illicit trade networks; and the Bansbari land scam, another significant land-related controversy.

Shrestha also initiated a probe into alleged cooperative fraud linked to Rabi Lamichhane. He deployed a Central Investigation Bureau (CIB) team, led by AIGP Kiran Bajracharya of the Central Investigation Bureau (CIB), to investigate the case. However, after Lamichhane became Home Minister, AIGP Bajracharya wasremoved from her position at the CIB, raising concerns about political interference in ongoing investigations.

In addition to pursuing these cases, Shrestha introduced key reforms aimed at modernizing law enforcement practices. Among them was the abolition of the long-standing practice of collecting "suraki kharchha," a traditional fee charged for leading private investigations. This reform marked a step toward enhancing fairness, accountability, and public trust in the justice system.

Cases Reopened by Narayan Kaji Shrestha
Case	Description	References
Bhutanese Refugees Scam	A scam involving the illegal settlement and exploitation of Bhutanese refugees.	Wikipedia The Kathmandu Post Foreign Policy
Lalita Niwas Land Grab Scam	A case involving high-profile land ownership disputes over public property.	Wikipedia, Kathmandu Post, Online Khabar
Gold Smuggling Case (Sunkanda)	A case involving the smuggling of 62 kg of gold, highlighting corruption and illicit trade.	My Republica, The Himalayan Times, The Hindu
Bansbari Land Scam	A land scam involving fraudulent activities related to the Bansbari Leather Shoe Factory land.	The Himalayan Times, Kathmandu Post, The Himalayan Times
