= Kiran Bajracharya =

Nepalese police officer

- किरण बज्राचार्य

Kathmandu Valley Police Office

Additional Inspector General of Police
- Incumbent
- Assumed office March 20, 2023
- President: Ram Chandra Poudel
- Prime Minister: Khadga Prasad Oli

Personal details
- Born: Tansen, Palpa
- Citizenship: Nepal

Kiran Bajracharya is a Nepali police officer who has served as the Additional Inspector General of Police.

== Policing career ==
Bajracharya's early work focused on investigating crimes against women and children, including human trafficking. As superintendent of Nepal Police between 2013 and 2015, she led several investigations into cases of organized crime and expanded the focus on human trafficking, initiating 14 cases, an increase from previous years. These investigations led to the arrests and convictions of criminal gang members involved in trafficking and other transnational crimes.

Bajracharya launched awareness campaigns for women working in brick kilns and conducted inspections at checkpoints for potential trafficking victims. Her work has focused on police ethics, gender equality, and human rights.

=== Senior management ===
Bajracharya was promoted to Additional Inspector General (AIG) of Police, a high-ranking position in the Nepal Police, and became chief of the Central Investigation Bureau (CIB). As AIG, she oversaw major cases involving high-profile crimes, including the Lalita Niwas land grab scam, the Gold Smuggling Case,), and the Bansbari Land Scam. She directed the arrest of Nepali Congress lawmaker Sunil Sharma during the CIB's nationwide "Foxtrot Charlie" operation, which targeted individuals involved in fraudulent activities, including the possession of fake academic certificates.

Before her role as AIG, Bajracharya held the position of Deputy Inspector General (DIG) in the Bagmati State Police. Currently, she is stationed at Valley Police in Kathmandu.

In March 2024, a high-level probe commission recommended action against AIG Bajracharya for allegedly sparing former home minister and Maoist vice-chairman Krishna Bahadur Mahara, who was allegedly involved in gold smuggling.

Kiran Bajracharya led the initial investigation into the high-profile Suryadarshan Savings and Credit Cooperative fraud case, which implicated the former Home Minister Rabi Lamichhane. The probe was launched under the leadership of then Home Minister Narayan Kaji Shrestha, who discreetly authorized the CIB to dispatch a team to Pokhara after a preliminary report by the Pokhara Metropolitan City implicated Lamichhane in a suspicious NPR 10 million loan taken while he was Managing Director of Gorkha Media Network. Acting on these findings, the CIB under Bajracharya’s command prepared an initial investigation report and requested the case file from the Kaski District Police Office to Kathmandu for further action. This early intervention by the CIB laid the foundation for a broader criminal investigation, which eventually led to Lamichhane’s arrest on charges of cooperative fraud and organized crime.

== Awards and recognition ==
In 2016, Bajracharya was awarded a Prabal Jansewa Shree medal by the President of Nepal, Bidya Devi Bhandari, for her performance as the District Police Chief of Bhaktapur. The United States Department of State has recognized her as an "anti-slavery hero" for her contributions against modern-day slavery and human trafficking.

Bajracharya won Public Servant of the Year in the 8th Asian Awards in 2018.
