= Govinda K.C. =

Nepalese surgeon and activist (born 1957)

- गोविन्द के.सी.
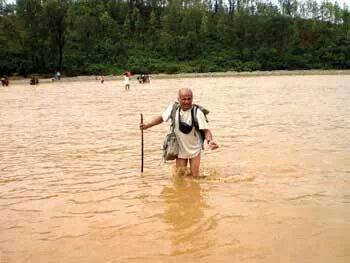
- K.C. crossing flooded river in 2014
- Born: Govinda K.C. 25 March 1957 (age 69); Ramechhap, Janakpur Zone, Nepal
- Other names: GKC, DrKC
- Education: Institute of Medicine, Nepal (H.A.); Rajshahi Medical College, Rajshahi, Bangladesh (M.B.B.S.); Dhaka University, Dhaka, Bangladesh (M.S.)
- Occupations: Orthopedic Surgeon; Social Activist
- Years active: 1974–2019 (retired due to age restriction)

Govinda K.C. (Nepali: गोविन्द के.सी.) is a Nepali orthopaedic surgeon and philanthropic activist. He is a professor of orthopaedics at Tribhuvan University Teaching Hospital (TUTH), part of the Institute of Medicine, Nepal. He is known for his humanitarian work and for his activism in favor of the independent academic functioning of the government medical institutions of Nepal, notably the Institute of Medicine and Patan Academy of Health Sciences. His non-violent protests and fasts have successfully pressured the Nepali government and stakeholders to make change.

== Early life and schooling ==
He studied at the Institute of Medicine in Nepal to become a Health Assistant (H.A.), the equivalent of a Physician Assistant in the U.S. He was unaware that this was a step to becoming a doctor. Upon completing his H.A., he got Ministry of Education scholarship to study for an M.B.B.S. in Bangladesh at Rajshahi Medical College. After graduation, he worked at Bir Hospital. He then received an M.S. in Orthopedic surgery from Dhaka University in Bangladesh. Although he wanted to serve in a tertiary hospital and there was a shortage of orthopedic surgeons in Kathmandu, plans were made to transfer him to a rural hospital where there would be no facilities to practice orthopedics. He resigned from Bir Hospital and joined the Institute of Medicine as a volunteer in 1994.

== Humanitarian work ==
K.C. has preferred to use his professorship salary to provide services in remote areas of Nepal and has travelled internationally in response to natural calamities. He has not taken funds from any non-governmental organizations (NGO) to provide these services. Apart from his work in the aftermath of the earthquake in Nepal, he financed these Nepalese and international humanitarian services himself.

=== Nepal ===
TUTH offers K.C. a few weeks of vacation every year. He spends this time at the most rural clinics in Nepal, which are unreachable by public transportation. He often travels long distances by foot to reach the clinics. In these clinics, he trains health workers to identify orthopaedic emergencies, provide emergency treatment, and if necessary, provide timely referrals. He also organizes health camps in remote places. He gives medications to people and makes the necessary arrangements to give free medical treatment when they come for further treatment in Kathmandu. He has faced allegations of being a spy and an insurgent when he worked in health during the Maoists' insurgency. The rural districts of Nepal had an outbreak of cholera some years ago. Many doctors refused to go there, even if paid. K.C. travelled to the afflicted areas to provide humanitarian aid, carrying the medicine on his back.

=== International ===
K.C. has travelled extensively to assist victims of international natural disasters. In 2001, he spent three weeks in the Bhuj region in Gujarat, India, after the earthquake. In 2005, he served in Northwest Pakistan for around 20 days after a disastrous earthquake. After a cyclone in Myanmar in 2008, the government of Myanmar prevented foreign aid agencies from entering the country but admitted him for two weeks. In 2010, he went to Haiti in the wake of the disastrous earthquake and served there for three weeks. In 2011, he served flood victims in Pakistan for two weeks. In 2013, he went to the Philippines to treat people affected by a tsunami there.

== Medical activism ==
K.C. has been a prominent campaigner for medical sector reform in Nepal in response to public allegations of both corruption and undue political pressure to give medical college affiliation to facilities with inadequate infrastructure. His ongoing advocacy over several years has included several lengthy personal hunger strikes, which have received extensive media coverage and successfully pressured authorities to make changes.

In January 2014, K.C. launched another hunger strike campaigning against the political appointment of a new dean of the IoM, which did not reflect seniority, as well as several other grievances. Supporting this cause, the Medical Association of Nepal shut down all hospitals except for emergency services across the country. The Nepal Medical Association called for mass resignation of doctors across the country, with almost a hundred doctors and professors resigning and announcing free medical camps in public places. These collective actions appeared to have been successful, so K.C. broke his fast.

== Fifth, sixth, and eighth fast-unto-death ==
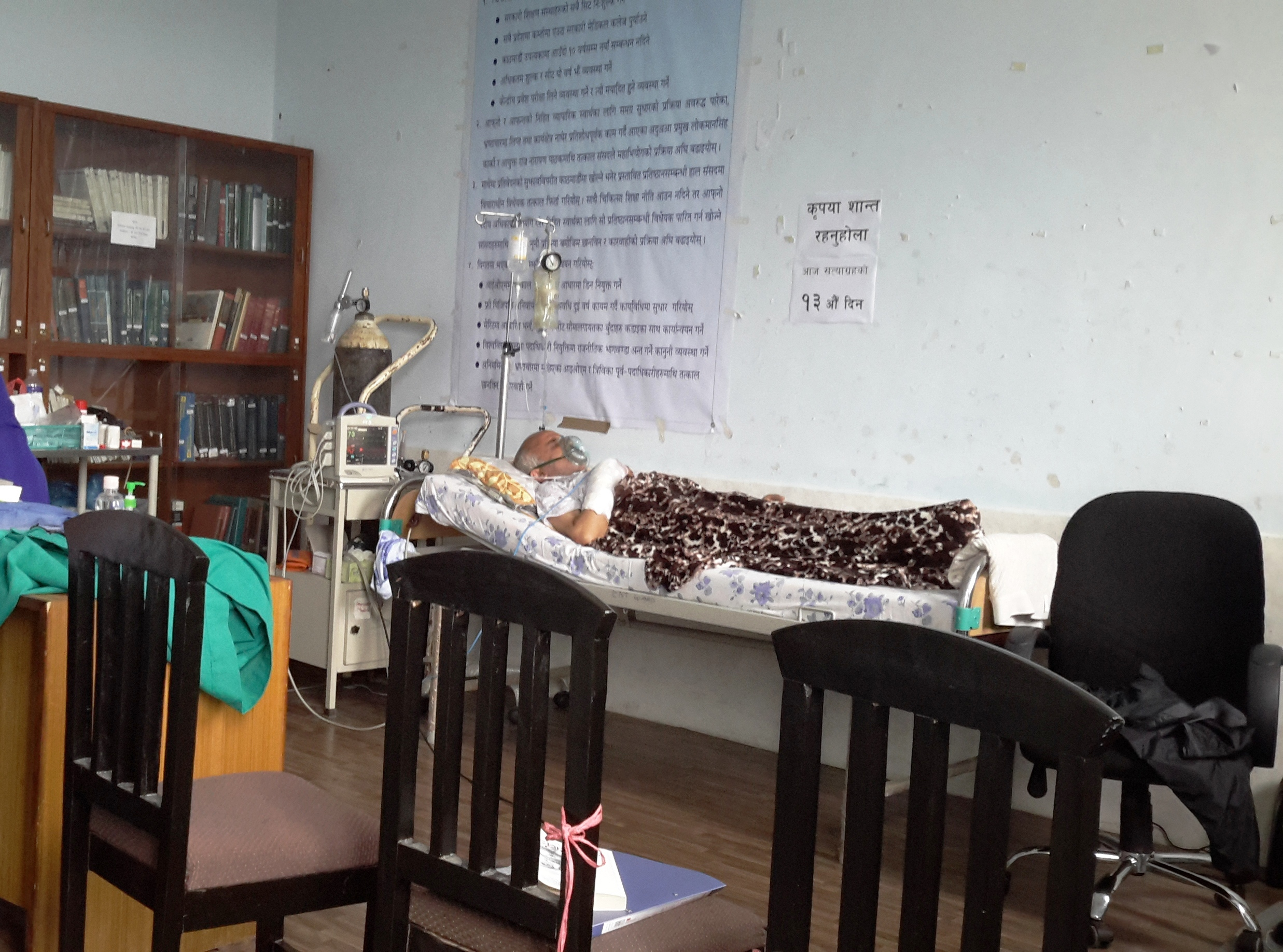
K.C. on the 13th day of his eighth hunger strike at Institute of Medicine, Maharajganj

In 2015, K.C. announced a fifth hunger strike after the Nepalese government retracted from its agreement with him and his movement to regulate the opening of new medical colleges based on a report presented by a team of specialists led by Kedar Bhakta Mathema. Chitralekha Yadav, Minister for Education, was accused of having made key amendments to the law to make way for the new Devdaha and Birat Medical colleges to be granted affiliation, beginning the dispute. Law-makers led by CPN UML leader Rajendra Pandey staged protests in the Constituent Assembly demanding the affiliation to be granted before the report would be presented to the government. They also presented a document with the signatures of 146 lawmakers, mostly from the CPN UML, threatening to topple the government if affiliation was not granted. These lawmakers had stated that their investments would go in vain if they were not allowed to run a medical college. Several independent observers stated that none of the proposed medical colleges had enough manpower and that most of them did not have adequate infrastructure or patient flow.

When his demands were not met, the K.C. protested peacefully with another hunger strike. His movement received widespread support from social sector activists, medical professionals and students, and artists including Nepathya and "Maha". However, there was a delay in receiving support from Nepal Medical Council and Nepal Medical Association. The Nepali prime minister, Koirala, was confronted with K.C.'s degrading health, to which he replied, "So what?", further incensing the movement.

The government of Nepal responded with a committee composed of the Minister for Education Chitralekha Yadav, the Minister for Health Khagaraj Adhikari, and the Chief Secretary Lilamani Paudel. The professor refused to hold talks with the ministers as there were concerns about loopholes in the law and the government forcing its way through existing rules to grant the new medical colleges affiliation. Meanwhile, the medical community and various leaders and celebrities expressed support for the protest movement. Nepal Medical Association urged all medical services to be halted except for emergency services. K.C. maintained that he was against the strike. Meanwhile, the professor's health deteriorated further. When the government of Nepal succumbed to mounting pressure and agreed to most of K.C.'s agenda, he broke his fast and the Nepal Medical Association and other supporters of the movement retracted the proposed protest measures.

K.C. sat on his sixth fast unto death from 24 August 2015 to 6 September as the Nepali government, heavily influenced by politicians and merchants, tried to deregulate medical colleges by undermining the Mathema report. The fast again ended with 11 commitments from the government to keep regulations.

K.C. began his eighth fast against the CIAA for the reform of medical education on 10 July 2016.

== Eleventh hunger strike ==
K.C. began his eleventh fast unto death from 24 July 2017 with a seven-point demand for medical education reform. He demanded that Kedar Bhakta Mathema lead the committee's recommendation in the forthcoming Medical Education Bill.

== Fourteenth hunger strike ==
On 8 January 2018, following the decision of the Supreme Court to reinstate Shashi Sharma as Dean of the Institute of Medicine, K.C. called a press conference to condemn the move and began his 14th hunger strike. K.C. accused the court of "selling justice" and began his hunger strike to demand the resignation of Chief Justice Gopal Parajuli. He alleged that the Chief Justice was "a corrupt individual having links with the mafia". Since 2014, Parajuli has ruled in favor of private medical colleges and against the Nepal Medical Council, the regulatory body governing medical education in the country, with rulings favoring seven for-profit medical colleges in the country.

Later that evening, the Supreme Court ordered K.C's arrest for contempt of court. He was arrested by the Kathmandu Metropolitan Police from TU Teaching hospital, where the hunger strike was being staged, and taken to the Singha Durbar Police Circle. Nepal Medical Association (NMA) demanded the release of K.C. and condemned the incident. NMA stated that K.C. had brought positive changes to the medical sector through his hunger strikes. On 9 January 2018, K.C. was presented before the Supreme Court, and a hearing was scheduled for 10 January. K.C. remained in custody until the hearing. In his statement at the court, K.C. stated that "Parajuli had lobbied and secured a job for his nephew at the Commission for the Investigation of Abuse of Authority (CIAA) as the commission's legal counselor despite the SC decision in favor of the former CIAA chief commissioner Lokman Singh Karki."

On 10 January 2018, he was released on a general date without bail by the Supreme Court. The Court ordered that the controversy of Chief Justice Gopal Parajuli's citizenship and the case of Shashi Sharma would be reopened. K.C.'s lawyer Surendra Bhandari stated on K.C.'s behalf that K.C. had accused the Chief Justice Parajuli of his corrupt actions. Similarly, K.C. upon his release, stated:

I am not scared of dying and I am not scared of contempt of court punishment. My fight is against Gopal Parajuli, not other judges. If I have erred it was not a deliberate mistake, please forgive me.

== Fifteenth hunger strike ==
K.C. initiated his 15th fast-unto-death in Jumla on June 30, 2018, to protest against alterations made to the Medical Education Ordinance Replacement Bill among other issues made by the government led by K. P. Oli.

== Personal life ==
Govinda is unmarried and lived within the hospital quarters until he retired from IoM. His family includes his mother and two brothers. When asked by Vijay Kumar Pandey in a television interview to list his three priorities in his life, he listed service to his patients and his students – and no third priority. Recently, he has been living with an unspecified relative in Kathmandu.

== See also ==
- Kedar Narsingh KC
- Health in Nepal
- Nepal Medical Council
