= Prem Kumar Rai =

Chief commissioner of CIAA Nepal

- प्रेमकुमार राई

Commission for the Investigation of Abuse of Authority

Honourable Chief Commissioner
- Incumbent
- Assumed office February 3, 2021
- Appointed by: K. P. Sharma Oli
- President: Ram Chandra Poudel

Prem Kumar Rai is the current chief commissioner of CIAA Nepal. He assumed office on February 3, 2021. He is also a former home secretary. He was recommended by the Constitutional Council on December 20, 2020, to be the new chief commissioner of CIAA.

Under his leadership, CIAA has filed a case against former Prime Minister and CPN UML Chairman Mathav Kumar Nepal regarding allowing Patanjali Yogpeeth to purchase land beyond legal limits. Although previous legal interpretation of law said that decision by cabinet is not reviewable by law, CIAA under Rai has taken a different approach as clear in this case.

== 2025 Gen-Z movement aftermath ==
On October 5, 2025, a faction of Gen-Z movement asked that Prem Kumar Rai be made to resign among other demands in the 8-point document that they presented Prime Minister Sushila Karki. In a separate event, the GenZ movement alliance also demanded the resignation of all commissioners of CIAA including the chief Prem Kumar Rai.

== Controversies ==
He has come into controversy regarding his involvement in wide-body corruption case. He was then a secretary of Ministry of Culture, Tourism and Civil Aviation at the time of corruption. This case became more controversial due to CIAA's decision not to prosecute Rai in the controversial procurement of the two wide-body aircraft. A lawmaker has since then called for his impeachment since then citing the thriving corruption and irregularities.

Rai has also allegedly been involved in land scam and fake Bhutanese refugee case. Activist Yubraj Paudel has filed a complaint demanding an investigation into Rai's involvement in major scandals. RSP leader Rabi Lamichhane has also questioned his involvement in corruption in Maoist combatant camps, wide-body procurement irregularities and Yeti/Omni cases.
