= Dhuwakot, Gorkha =

Dhuwakot, Gorkha धुवाँकोट
- Former Village development committee
- Location in Nepal Dhuwakot, Gorkha (Nepal)
- Coordinates: 27.97°N 84.50°E
- Country: Nepal
- Province: Gandaki Province
- District: Gorkha District

Population (2011)
  - Total: 4,259
- Time zone: UTC+5:45 (Nepal Time)

Dhuwakot is a former village development committee currently located in Palungtar municipality of Gorkha District in the Gandaki Province (previously Gandaki Zone) of northern-central Nepal. At the time of the 2011 Nepal census it had a population of 4,259 and had 1,110 houses in the town.
