= Palungtar Airport =

- IATA: GKH; ICAO: VNGK

Summary
- Airport type: Public
- Serves: Palungtar and Gorkha, Nepal
- Elevation AMSL: 1,467 ft / 447 m
- Coordinates: 28°02′20″N 84°27′57″E

Map
- Location of airport in Nepal

Runways
Direction	Length		Surface
Direction	m	ft	Surface
02/20	1,067	3,501	Grass/Clay

Palungtar Airport (IATA: GKH, ICAO: VNGK) also known as Gorkha Airport, was an airport serving the municipalities Palungtar and Gorkha of Gorkha District in the Southern region of Gandaki Province of Nepal.

== History ==
The airport was originally opened in October 1960. It is currently out of operation, for which the District of Gorkha has no active airport as of 2018. It used to serve as a main tourist gateway to the former royal city of Gorkha and its palaces, but lost importance after the area received road connectivity, namely Prithivi Highway. Despite being out of operation, the airport served as a major landing site for helicopters distributing relief material after the Gorkha earthquake in 2015.

== Facilities ==
The airport resides at an elevation of 1,467 feet (447 m) above mean sea level. It had one grass/clay runway which is 1,067 metres (3,501 ft) in length.

== Former airlines and destinations ==
Until 1979, Nepal Airlines operated several routes from the airport.
