= Amppipal =

Amppipal आँपपिपल AamPipal
- Village
- Location in Nepal Amppipal (Nepal)
- Coordinates: 28°4′N 84°32′E
- Country: Nepal
- Province: Gandaki Province
- District: Gorkha District
- Municipality: Palungtar Municipality
- Time zone: UTC+5:45 (Nepal Time)

Amppipal (Nepali: आँपपिपल), also known as Amp Pipal, is a village in Palungtar Municipality, Gorkha District, Nepal. It is located near Ligligkot, a historic hill fort associated with the early expansion of the Gorkha Kingdom.

== Health care ==
Amppipal is home to Amp Pipal Hospital, which was established in 1969 and was originally operated by the United Mission to Nepal. The hospital has received support from Nepalmed e.V., a German non-governmental organization based in Grimma.

== Culture ==
The village hosts a local market serving nearby communities. Cultural and religious celebrations in the area include Dashain, Tihar and Teej. Lakhe Nach, a traditional masked dance associated with Newar culture, is also performed during local festivals.

== Education ==
Shree Janata Secondary School is located in Amppipal.

== See also ==
- Ligligkot
- Palungtar Municipality
- Gorkha District
