= 40-Point Demands =

40-Point Demands (Nepali: ४० बुँदे मागपत्र) were given to Nepalese Prime Minister Sher Bahadur Deuba by Baburam Bhattarai on 4 February 1996 in Singha Durbar. Bhattarai said that if the demands were not met by 17 February, he would launch a war against the government. As their demands were not met, subsequently, they launched the Nepalese Civil War on 13 February.

== Background ==
The Communist Party of Nepal (CPN (UML)) started a survey across 18 districts in 1992 in order to identify how to carry out a people's war. The CPL (UML) created a 38-point charter of demands relating to nationalism, democracy, and livelihood.

Baburam Bhattarai and the CPN (UML) submitted its 40 point demands, which were mostly similar to its 38 points demand, to Prime Minister Sher Bahadur Deuba through the United People's Front of Nepal (UPF) on 4 February 1996. The government was given a two week ultimatum. A people's war was declared on 13 February, four days before the ultimatum was set to expire.

== Content ==
Universal health care and universal access to education was requested.

A new constitution was requested. All of the special rights and privileges held by the king and royal family would be eliminated. The police, army, and administration would be placed under civilian control.

The demands included the abrogation of "all discriminatory treaties", including the India–Nepal Treaty of Peace and Friendship.

Local autonomy for ethnic minorities was requested, including the demand that these groups be allowed to be education in their own native language.

== Aftermath ==
Fighting in the Nepalese Civil War continued until a ceasefire on 23 July 2001. The government and CPN (UML) conducted three rounds of talks on 30 August and discussed 13 to 15 demands, including the creation of an interim government, a constituent assembly, and a new constitution. These meetings failed and ended on 21 November.

== Works cited ==
- Rushton, Simon; Devkota, Bhimsen (2020). "Choosing not to weaponize healthcare: politics and health service delivery during Nepal's civil war, 1996-2006". Medicine, Conflict and Survival. 36 (3). Taylor & Francis: 212–231. doi:10.2307/27018485. JSTOR 27018485.
- Shukla, Deeptima (2003). "Insurgency in Nepal and Role of State". The Indian Journal of Political Science. 64 (2). Indian Political Science Association: 61–78. doi:10.2307/41855770. JSTOR 41855770.
- Turin, Mark (2005). "Language Endangerment and Linguistic Rights in the Himalayas: A Case Study from Nepal". Mountain Research and Development. 25 (1). International Mountain Society: 4–9. doi:10.2307/3674361. JSTOR 3674361.
- Verma, Anand; Navlakha, Gautam (2007). "People's War in Nepal: Genesis and Development". Economic and Political Weekly. 42 (20). Economic and Political Weekly: 1839–1843. doi:10.2307/4419604. JSTOR 4419604.
