= Gorkha 1 =

Parliamentary constituency in Gandaki Province, Nepal

- Parliamentary constituency for the House of Representatives
- Gorkha 1 in Gandaki Province

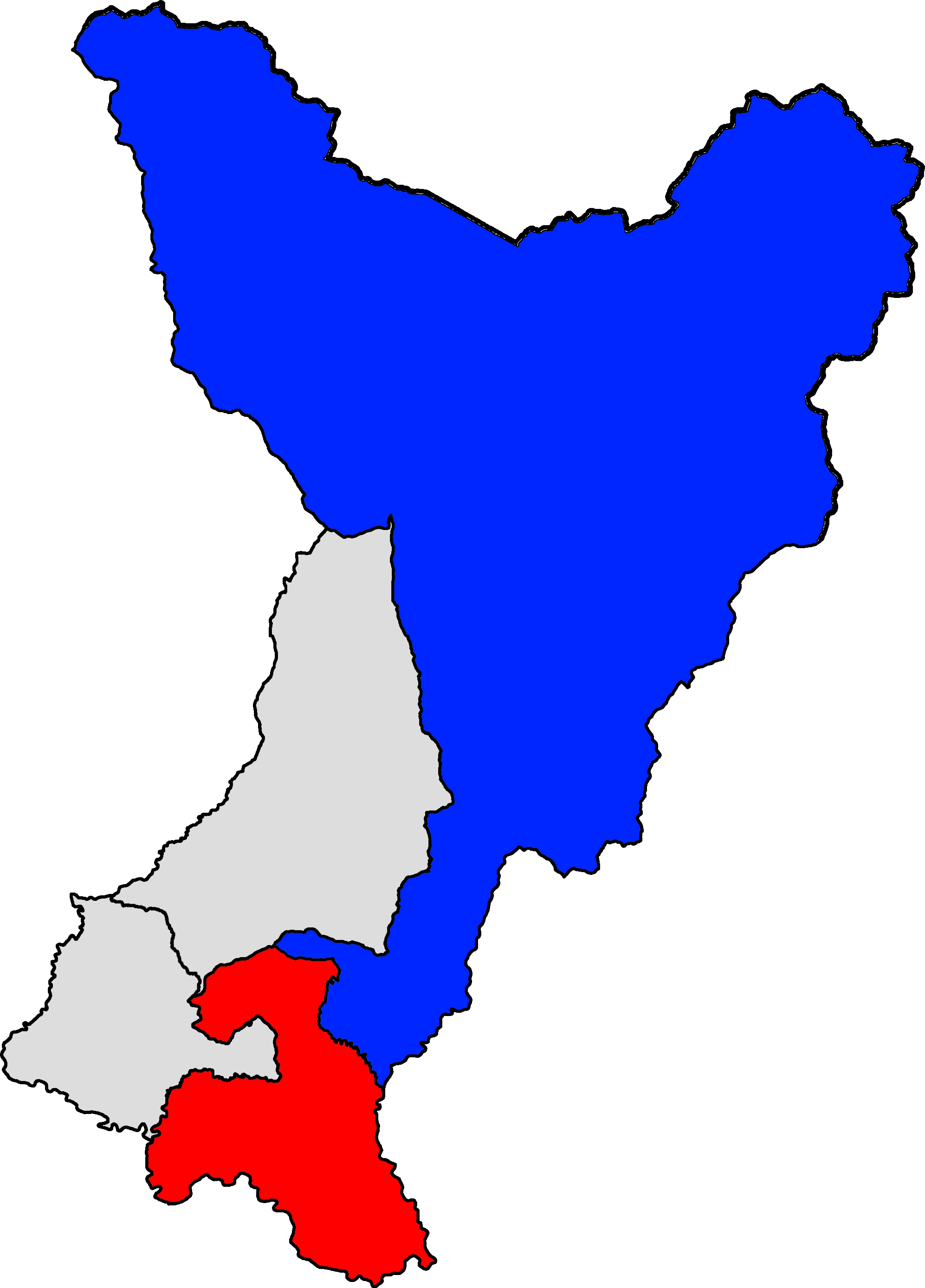
- Assembly segments Gorkha 1(A) and Gorkha 1(B) within Gorkha District
- Province: Gandaki Province
- District: Gorkha District
- Electorate: 98,622

Current constituency
- Created: 1991
- Party: Rastriya Swatantra Party
- MP: Sudan Gurung
- Gandaki MPA 1(A): Lekha Bahadur Thapa Magar (NCP)
- Gandaki MPA 1(B): Ram Sharan Basnet (NCP)

Gorkha 1 is one of two parliamentary constituencies of Gorkha District in Nepal. This constituency came into existence on the Constituency Delimitation Commission (CDC) report submitted on 31 August 2017.

== Incorporated areas ==
Gorkha 1 incorporates Tshum Nubri Rural Municipality, Dharche Rural Municipality, Arughat Rural Municipality, Bhimsen Rural Municipality, Gandaki Rural Municipality, Shahid Lakhan Rural Municipality and wards 1–7 of Gorkha Municipality.

== Assembly segments ==
It encompasses the following Gandaki Provincial Assembly segment

- Gorkha 1(A)
- Gorkha 1(B)

== Members of Parliament ==
=== Parliament/Constituent Assembly ===
Election	Member	Party
1991	Chiranjibi Wagle	Nepali Congress
2008	Parbati Thapa Shrestha	CPN (Maoist)
January 2009	Parbati Thapa Shrestha	UCPN (Maoist)
2013	Dr. Baburam Bhattarai	UCPN (Maoist)
2017	Hari Raj Adhikari	CPN (Maoist Centre)
May 2018	Hari Raj Adhikari	Nepal Communist Party
March 2021	Hari Raj Adhikari	CPN (Maoist Centre)
2022	Rajendra Bajgai	Nepali Congress
2026	Sudan Gurung	Rastriya Swatantra Party (RSP)

=== Provincial Assembly ===
==== 1(A) ====
Election	Member	Party
2017	Lekh Bahadur Thapa Magar	CPN (Maoist Centre)
May 2018	Lekh Bahadur Thapa Magar	Nepal Communist Party

==== 1(B) ====
Election	Member	Party
2017	Ram Sharan Basnet	CPN (Unified Marxist-Leninist)
May 2018	Ram Sharan Basnet	Nepal Communist Party

== Election results ==
=== Election in the 2020s ===
==== 2022 general election ====
Candidate	Party	Votes	%
Rajendra Bajgai	Nepali Congress	33,428	58.41
Ram Sharan Basnet	CPN (UML)	16,785	29.33
Subarna Rokaha	Rastriya Swatantra Party	4,892	8.55
Others		2,126	3.71
Total		57,231	100.00
Majority		16,643	
Nepali Congress gain			

==== 2022 provincial election ====
===== 1(A) =====
Candidate	Party	Votes	%
Krishna Prasad Dhital	CPN (Maoist Centre)	15,457	52.50
Surendra Bahdaur Thapa	CPN (UML)	9,822	33.36
Sudip Dhakal	Rastriya Prajatantra Party	1,780	6.05
Ram Sharan Acharya	Independent	1,302	4.42
Ganga Bahadur Rana	Mongol National Organisation	847	2.88
Others	236	0.80	
Total		29,444	100.00
Majority		5,635	
CPN (Maoist Centre)			

===== 1(B) =====
Candidate	Party	Votes	%
Nanda Prasad Neupane	Nepali Congress	16,265	57.10
Mohan Prasad Bhattarai	CPN (UML)	7,533	26.44
Dak Bahadur Parajuli	Independent	3,694	12.97
Others	995	3.49	
Total		28,487	100.00
Majority		8,732	
Nepali Congress			

=== Election in the 2010s ===
==== 2017 legislative elections ====
Party	Candidate	Votes
CPN (Maoist Centre)	Hari Raj Adhikari	29,860
Nepali Congress	Chinkaji Shrestha	26,643
CPN (Marxist–Leninist)	Narayan Babu Acharya	1,639
Others		1,242
Invalid votes		4,320
Result	Maoist Centre hold	
Source: Election Commission

==== 2017 Nepalese provincial elections ====
===== 1(A) =====
Party	Candidate	Votes
Communist Party of Nepal (Maoist Centre)	Lekh Bahadur Thapa Magar	16,558
Nepali Congress	Dhiran Thapa	14,019
Others		548
Invalid votes		1,359
Result	Maoist Centre gain	
Source: Election Commission

===== 1(B) =====
Party	Candidate	Votes
CPN (Unified Marxist–Leninist)	Ram Sharan Basnet	16,656
Nepali Congress	Rajendra Bajgain	13,001
Mongol National Organisation	Prasad Gurung	138
Invalid votes		1,256
Result	CPN (UML) gain	
Source: Election Commission

==== 2013 Constituent Assembly election ====
Party	Candidate	Votes
UCPN (Maoist)	Dr. Baburam Bhattarai	22,824
Nepali Congress	Kiran Babu Shrestha	8,971
CPN (Unified Marxist–Leninist)	Ram Sharan Basnet	4,944
CPN (Marxist–Leninist)	Narayan Babu Acharya	1,557
Others		866
Result	Maoist hold	
Source: NepalNews

=== Election in the 2000s ===
==== 2008 Constituent Assembly election ====
Party	Candidate	Votes
CPN (Maoist)	Parbati Thapa Shrestha	40,606
Nepali Congress	Chiranjibi Wagle	9,142
CPN (Unified Marxist–Leninist)	Baburam Thapa	4,339
Rastriya Prajatantra Party	Rudra Raj Pandey	1,436
Others		940
Invalid votes		1,832
Result	Maoist gain	
Source: Election Commission

=== Election in the 1990s ===
==== 1999 legislative elections ====
Party	Candidate	Votes
Nepali Congress	Chiranjibi Wagle	17,305
CPN (Unified Marxist–Leninist)	Ram Sharan Basnet	13,438
Rastriya Prajatantra Party	Narayan Malla	5,641
CPN (Marxist–Leninist)	Surendra Bahadur Thapa	2,580
Rastriya Prajatantra Party (Chand)	Rajeshwar Devkota	1,733
Rastriya Janamukti Party	Bhaikaji Rana	1,128
Others		290
Invalid Votes		1,478
Result	Congress hold	
Source: Election Commission

==== 1994 legislative elections ====
Party	Candidate	Votes
Nepali Congress	Chiranjibi Wagle	13,223
Rastriya Prajatantra Party	Narayan Malla	11,236
CPN (Unified Marxist–Leninist)	Rishi Ram Sharma	4,426
Independent	Chet Bahadur Rana	1,820
Others		1,420
Result	Congress hold	
Source: Election Commission

==== 1991 legislative elections ====
Party	Candidate	Votes
Nepali Congress	Chiranjibi Wagle	15,496
Samyukta Jana Morcha Nepal		12,986
Result	Congress gain	

== See also ==
- List of parliamentary constituencies of Nepal
