= Baburam Bhattarai =

Prime Minister of Nepal from 2011 to 2013

- बाबुराम भट्टराई
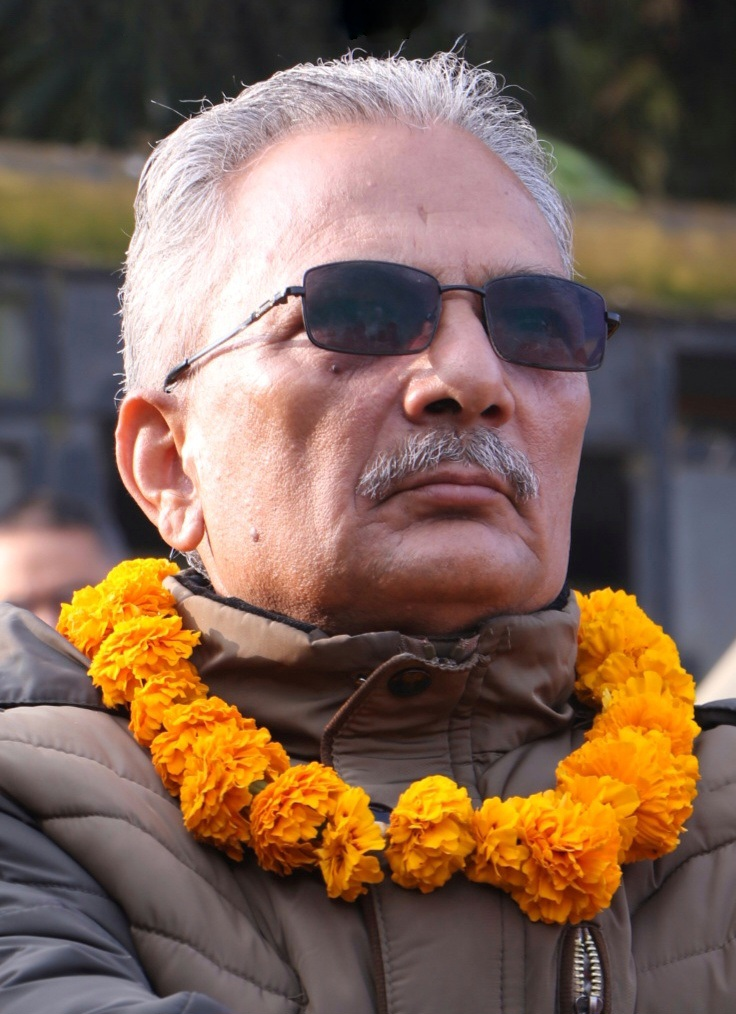
- Bhattarai in 2017

Prime Minister of Nepal
- In office 29 August 2011 – 14 March 2013
- President: Ram Baran Yadav
- Deputy: Bijaya Kumar Gachchhadar; Narayan Kaji Shrestha; Krishna Prasad Sitaula (6 – 29 May 2012); Ishwar Pokhrel (16 – 29 May 2012)
- Preceded by: Jhala Nath Khanal
- Succeeded by: Khil Raj Regmi (interim)

Minister of Finance
- In office 22 August 2008 – 25 May 2009
- Prime Minister: Pushpa Kamal Dahal
- Preceded by: Ram Sharan Mahat
- Succeeded by: Surendra Pandey

Chairman of the Pragatisheel Loktantrik Party
- Incumbent
- Assumed office 20 November 2025
- Preceded by: Position established

Member of the House of Representatives
- In office 4 March 2018 – 18 September 2022
- Preceded by: Hit Raj Pandey (as Member of the Constituent Assembly)
- Succeeded by: Pushpa Kamal Dahal
- Constituency: Gorkha 2

Member of the Constituent Assembly
- In office 21 January 2014 – 26 September 2015
- Preceded by: Parbati Thapa Shrestha
- Succeeded by: Hari Raj Adhikari (as Member of Parliament)
- Constituency: Gorkha 1
- In office 28 May 2008 – 28 May 2012
- Preceded by: Kamala Panta (as Member of Parliament)
- Succeeded by: Hit Raj Pandey
- Constituency: Gorkha 2

Personal details
- Born: 18 June 1954 (age 72) Khoplang, Nepal
- Party: Pragatisheel Loktantrik Party
- Other political affiliations: CPN (Fourth Convention); Samyukta Janamorcha; UCPN (Maoist) (before 2015); Naya Shakti (2016-2019)
- Spouse: Hisila Yami (m. 1980)
- Children: 1
- Parents: Bhoj Prasad Bhattarai (father); Dharma Kumari Bhattarai (mother)
- Relatives: Dharma Ratna Yami(father-in-law)
- Education: Amrit Science College, Tribhuvan University; Chandigarh College of Architecture (B.Arch.); SPA New Delhi (M.Tech.); Jawaharlal Nehru University (PhD)

Baburam Bhattarai (Note: Nepali: बाबुराम भट्टराई, pronounced [ˈbaburam ˈbʱʌʈːʌrai̯]) (born 18 June 1954), also known by his nom de guerre Laaldhwoj, is a Nepalese politician and architect who served as the Prime Minister of Nepal from 2011 to 2013. He currently is serving as the leader of the Pragatisheel Loktantrik Party.

Bhattarai was a long-time leading member and deputy chairman of the Unified Communist Party of Nepal (Maoist) prior to founding a new party, Naya Shakti Party, Nepal. He subsequently renounced communism and embraced democratic socialism.

== Political career ==
In 1996, the Maoists started the Nepalese Civil War, which had a huge impact on the political system in Nepal. The decade-long civil war, in which more than 17,000 Nepalese died, had a major role in the transformation of Nepal from a monarchy into a republic. Bhattarai was elected to the Constituent Assembly from Gorkha 1 as a Maoist candidate in 2008 and became Minister of Finance in the cabinet formed after the election.

Bhattarai became Prime Minister in 2011. As a way out of the political deadlock since the dissolution of the first Nepalese Constituent Assembly in May 2012, he was replaced by Chief Justice Khil Raj Regmi as head of an interim government that was to hold elections by 21 June 2013. He was a senior Standing Committee member and vice chairperson of the Maoist party until his resignation from his post and all party responsibilities on 26 September 2015. He was until recently the Coordinator of the Naya Shakti. As of 2019, he was the Chairman of the Federal Council of the newly formed Samajbadi Party, Nepal, a party formed by the merger of the Naya Shakti Party, Nepal and the Federal Socialist Forum, Nepal. Later Samajbadi Party, Nepal merged with Rastriya Janata Party Nepal to form People's Socialist Party, Nepal.

=== Maoist insurrection ===
On 4 February 1996, Bhattarai gave the government, led by Prime Minister Sher Bahadur Deuba, from the Nepali Congress, a list of 40 demands, threatening civil war if those were not met. The demands related to "nationalism, democracy, and livelihood" and included an end to the "domination of foreign capital in Nepali industries, business and finance", abrogation of "discriminatory treaties, including the 1950 Nepal-India Treaty", and confiscation and distribution of "land under the control of the feudal system to the landless and the homeless". They started armed movement before the deadline to fulfill the demand given by themselves to the government. After that, and until 26 April 2006, the guerrilla leader Prachanda directed the military efforts of the CPN (M) towards establishing areas of control, particularly in the mountainous regions and western Nepal.

The 40 demands were whittled down to 24 in subsequent political negotiations.

In late 2004 or early 2005, the relations between Prachanda and Bhattarai cooled down. This was reportedly due to disagreement on power sharing inside the party. Bhattarai was unhappy with the consolidation of power under Prachanda. At one point, Prachanda expelled Bhattarai from the party, though he was later reinstated. They later reconciled at least some of their differences.

On 22 November 2005, Prachanda and the Seven Party Alliance released a "twelve-point agreement" that expressed areas of agreement between the CPN(M) and the parties that won a large majority in the last parliamentary election in 1999. Among other points, this document stated that a dictatorial monarchy of King Gyanendra is the chief impediment to progress in Nepal. It claimed further that the Maoists are committed to human rights and press freedoms and a multi-party system of government. It pledged self-criticism and the intention of the Maoists and the Seven Parties to not repeat past mistakes.

=== Ceasefires ===
Several ceasefires have occurred over the course of the Nepalese civil war. Most recently, on 26 April 2006, Prachanda announced a ceasefire with a stated duration of 90 days. The move followed weeks of massive protests—the April 2006 Nepalese general strike— in Kathmandu and elsewhere that had forced King Gyanendra to give up the personal dictatorship he had established on 1 February 2005 and restore the parliament that was dissolved in May 2002.

After that, a new government was established by the Seven-Party Alliance. The Parliament and the new government supported the ceasefire and started negotiations with the Maoists on the basis of the twelve-point agreement. The two sides agreed that a new constituent assembly will be elected to write a new constitution, and decide the fate of the monarchy. The Maoists wanted this process to end with Nepal becoming a republic of Nepal.

=== Premiership, 2011-2013 ===
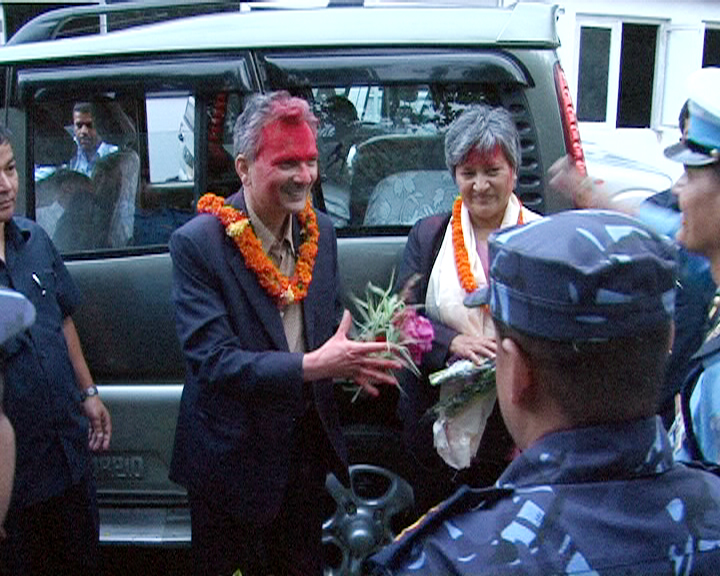
Bhattarai being greeted with flowers after being elected Prime Minister on 28 August 2011.

Bhattarai was elected 36th Prime minister of Nepal. Having been elected from UCPN (Maoist). He was elected in support small parties including MJF (Loktantrik), MJF (Republican), TMLP, TMSP and Nepal Sadbhawana Party splinter groups. Bhattarai led the country from 29 August 2011 to 14 March 2013.

=== Naya Shakti ===
On 12 July 2016, Baburam Bhattarai announced the establishment of the Naya Shakti Nepal (New Force Nepal) as a new political party under his leadership. On 24 January, he had announced to establish a new political force. The leaders of Major Parties attended the ceremony. Ashok Sharma, Karishma Manandhar and other 33 new members were announced in that ceremony. He took part in a ceremony announcing an alliance with CPN UML and CPN Maoist centre but left the alliance after two weeks as he was not guaranteed an election ticket.

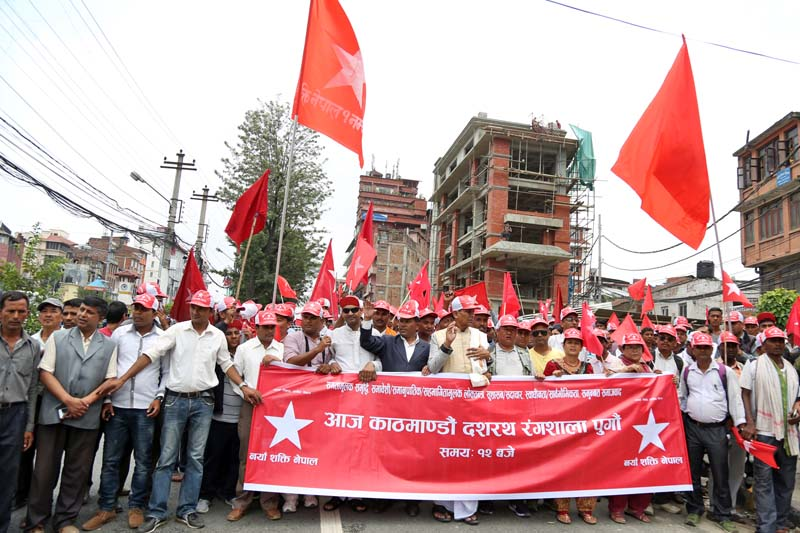
Cadres of the Baburam Bhattarai-led Naya Shaki Nepal marching towards the Dasthrath Stadium to attend a ceremony organised to announce the establishment of the Party, on Sunday, 12 June 2016. Photo: RSS

== Personal life ==
Bhattarai was born in Gorkha Belbas in Khoplang VDC. He was born into an upper-middle class peasant family. He has three siblings: one elder sister, one younger sister and one younger brother. He belongs to the Bahun group.

He completed his secondary school education from Amar Jyoti High School in Luintel, Gorkha. He was a classmate of Upendra Devkota. He went to high school at Amrit Science College. After that under the Colombo plan scholarship, he studied Bachelor of Architecture in 1977 from Chandigarh. "He had been an outstanding student", says Lieut-Col Bakshi (retd), Principal of the college. It was during this time he became the founding President of All India Nepalese Student's Association. This organization ended up becoming his first step towards building his academic interests outside the field of architecture.

Bhattarai went to the Delhi School of Planning and Architecture for an M.Tech. degree. He is married to Hisila Yami, a fellow Maoist leader. They have a daughter, Manushi.

He completed his PhD degree from Jawaharlal Nehru University in 1986. His thesis was published in 2003 as "The Nature of Underdevelopment and Regional Structure of Nepal - A Marxist Analysis".

== Publications ==
Bhattarai has contributed a number of published works, including The Nature of Underdevelopment and Regional Structure of Nepal: A Marxist Analysis (Adroit Publishers, Delhi, 2003) which is a cursory rewriting of his PhD thesis. Other works include Politico-Economic Rationale of People's War in Nepal (Utprerak Publications, Kathmandu, 1998), and Nepal! krantika aadharharu (in Nepali) (Janadisha Publications, 2004). His books and articles have had some impact on Nepalis both at home and abroad, though primarily only on those who share his political beliefs. Among his many well read newspaper articles is "Let's Give No Legitimacy to the Beneficiaries of the New Kot Massacre" written in the aftermath of Palace Massacre of 2001. Similarly, it is widely believed that he is the principal author of the most successful Election Manifesto brought out by Communist Party of Nepal (Maoists) in March 2008 in preparation of the Constituent Assembly Election held in April 2008.

He was also one of the signatories of Statement on AI Risk (2023) open letter.

== See also ==
- Pragatisheel Loktantrik Party

== Notes ==
Political offices
Preceded by Jhala Nath Khanal	Prime Minister of Nepal; 2011–2013	Succeeded by Khil Raj Regmi
