= Medicine, Conflict and Survival =

Publication devoted to the health aspects of violence and human rights

- Discipline: General medical
- Language: English
- Edited by: Marion Birch

Publication details
- Former names: Medicine and War
- History: 1985–present
- Publisher: Routledge
- Frequency: Quarterly
- Open access: Hybrid

Standard abbreviations
- ISO 4: Med. Confl. Surviv.

Indexing
- ISSN: 1362-3699 (print); 1743-9396 (web)

Links
- Journal homepage

Medicine, Conflict and Survival is a scholarly publication covering the health aspects of violence and human rights. It is an official journal of MEDACT and International Physicians for the Prevention of Nuclear War (IPPNW).
