= Sanabesi =

Sanabesi सानाबेसी मिरकोट गोरखा
- Village of Gorkha
- Sanabesi is a village of Palungtar municipality

- Location in Nepal Sanabesi (Nepal)
- Coordinates: 28°0′0″N 84°38′0″E
- Country: Nepal
- Region: Western
- Zone: Gandaki Zone
- District: Gorkha District
- VDC: Mirkot VDC
- Time zone: UTC+5:45 (Nepal Time)
- Postal code: 34000 D.P.O.
- Area code: 064
- सानाबेसी: Sanabesi
- Website: www.hamrogorkha.com
- You can log on or subscribe on facebook.com/mirkotvdc

Sanabesi (सानाबेसी) is a Village of Mirkot village development committee in Gorkha District in the Gandaki Zone of northern-central Nepal. Sanabesi lies in Ward no. 8 in Mirkot VDC.
