= Hari Raj Adhikari =

Nepali politician

- हरिराज अधिकारी

Member of Parliament, Pratinidhi Sabha
- In office 4 March 2018 – 18 September 2022
- Constituency: Gorkha 1
- Preceded by: Baburam Bhattarai

Personal details
- Born: 29 November 1967 (age 58)
- Party: CPN (Maoist Centre)
- Other political affiliations: CPN (Masal); Samyukta Janamorcha

Hari Raj Adhikari is a Nepalese politician who served as the member Of House Of Representatives (Nepal) from Gorkha-1, Province No. 4. He is a member of the Nepal Communist Party.
