= Lalita Niwas land grab scam =

Corruption case in Nepal

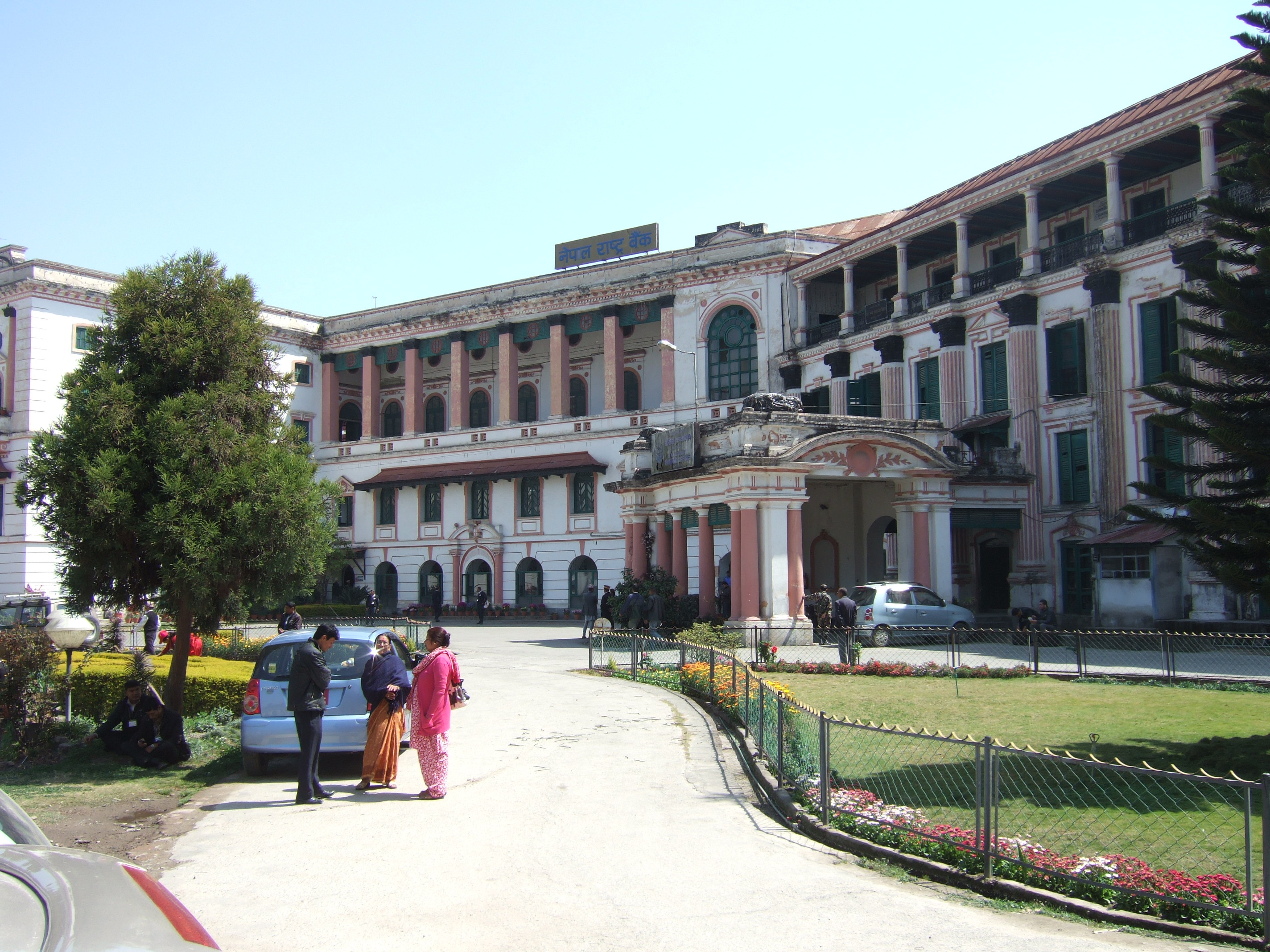
Nepal Rashtra Bank

Lalita Niwas land grab scam or Lalita Niwas land scam (Nepali: ललिता निवास प्रकरण) is a scam where the land ownership of government owned Lalita Niwas which houses the Official Residence of the Prime Minister of Nepal, central office of the Nepal Rastra Bank and other VIP residences, was illegally transferred by land brokers to big business groups of Nepal through collusion with land revenue officials, ministers, political leaders and secretaries at various ministries of Nepal. The land involved in the land grab scam was 114 ropanis which amounted to billions of Nepalese rupees.

== Background ==
Lalita Niwas complex consists of Official Residence of the Prime Minister of Nepal, central office of the Nepal Rastra Bank and other VIP residences. Prime Minister of Nepal Bhim Shumsher Jang Bahadur Rana forcefully acquired 300 ropanis of land from hundreds of civilians and built a Subarna Mahal palace for his grandson Subarna Shamsher Rana during 1920s. The palace was later renamed Lalita Niwas after possibly Subarna Shamsher's mother Lalita. After King Mahendra of Nepal conducted coup and seized control from a democratically elected government in 1960, then Finance Minister Subarna Shamsher leader of the Congress party, fled and his land of 14 ropanis was captured by the government while remaining 284 ropanis was acquired by government through fair compensation.

== Scam ==
On 6 February 2020, Commission for the Investigation of Abuse of Authority filed a corruption charge against 175 individuals which included former deputy prime minister Bijay Kumar Gachhadar, four former ministers, former head of the CIAA Deep Basnyat, and two former secretaries. On January 6, 2022, the Central Investigation Bureau (CIB) of Nepal Police initiated legal proceedings against more than 300 people including senior ex-government officials. Some of the influential business houses include Goyal, Sarda, Chachan and Kedia groups. Bhatbhateni Supermarket owner Min Bahadur Gurung and land brokers Shobhakanta Dhakal and Ram Kumar Subedi were found to have chiefly involved in bringing other business houses as partners. Gurung, Dhakal and Subedi bought the land in the year 2061 B.S. and sold it to politicians, business houses, and other 'powerful' individuals. Then ruling Nepal Communist Party (NCP) General Secretary Bishnu Prasad Paudel, also had bought a piece of land from the Gurung-Dhakal-Subedi group; Bishnu himself claimed to have purchased 8 Aana of land from Shobhakanta Dhakal's wife. Shobhakanta Dhakal, Ram Kumar Subedi and Ram Kumar's wife Madhavi Subedi were accused of creating fake documents to transfer government ownership to private ownership.
