= Pushpa Kamal Dahal =

Nepali politician (born 1954)

- पुष्पकमल दाहाल
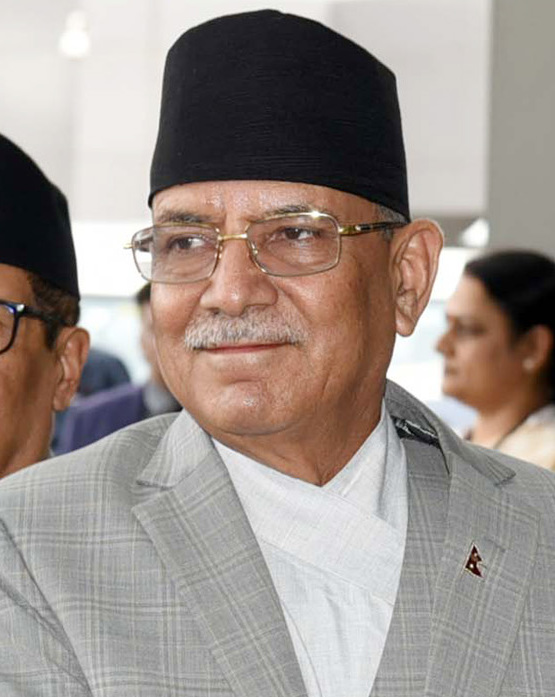
- Dahal in 2023

Prime Minister of Nepal
- In office 26 December 2022 – 15 July 2024
- President: Bidya Devi Bhandari; Ram Chandra Paudel
- Deputy: Purna Bahadur Khadka; Bishnu Prasad Paudel; Narayan Kaji Shrestha; Rabi Lamichhane; Rajendra Prasad Lingden
- Preceded by: Sher Bahadur Deuba
- Succeeded by: K. P. Sharma Oli
- In office 4 August 2016 – 7 June 2017
- President: Bidya Devi Bhandari
- Deputy: Bimalendra Nidhi; Bijay Kumar Gachhadar
- Preceded by: K. P. Sharma Oli
- Succeeded by: Sher Bahadur Deuba
- In office 15 August 2008 – 25 May 2009
- President: Ram Baran Yadav
- Deputy: Bam Dev Gautam
- Preceded by: Girija Prasad Koirala
- Succeeded by: Madhav Kumar Nepal

Leader of the Opposition
- In office 15 July 2024 – 12 September 2025
- Prime Minister: K. P. Sharma Oli
- Preceded by: Sher Bahadur Deuba
- Succeeded by: Bhishma Raj Angdembe (2026)
- In office 11 February 2014 – 11 October 2015
- Prime Minister: Sushil Koirala
- Preceded by: Ram Chandra Paudel (2013)
- Succeeded by: Sushil Koirala
- In office 25 May 2009 – 6 February 2011
- Prime Minister: Madhav Kumar Nepal
- Preceded by: Girija Prasad Koirala
- Succeeded by: Ram Chandra Paudel
Senior party positions
Coordinator of the Nepali Communist Party
Incumbent
Assumed office 5 November 2025
Co-coordinator	Madhav Kumar Nepal
Preceded by	Party founded
Chairman of the CPN (Maoist Centre)
In office 8 March 2021 – 4 November 2025
Preceded by	Position re-established
Succeeded by	Position abolished (Note: Party merged multiple other communist parties (excluding CPN (UML)) to form Nepali Communist Party)
In office 22 May 1994 – 17 May 2018
Preceded by	Position established
Succeeded by	Position abolished (Note: Party merged with CPN (UML) to form NCP)
Chairman of the Nepal Communist Party
In office 17 May 2018 – 8 March 2021 Serving with K. P. Sharma Oli
Preceded by	Position established
Succeeded by	Position abolished
Parliamentary offices
Member of the House of Representatives
Incumbent
Assumed office 26 March 2026
Preceded by	Purna Bahadur Gharti
Constituency	Eastern Rukum 1
In office 22 December 2022 – 12 September 2025
Preceded by	Baburam Bhattarai
Succeeded by	Kabindra Burlakoti
Constituency	Gorkha 2
In office 4 March 2018 – 18 September 2022
Preceded by	Krishna Bhakta Pokhrel (as Member of the Constituent Assembly)
Succeeded by	Bikram Pandey
Constituency	Chitwan 3
Member of the Constituent Assembly / Legislature Parliament
In office 21 January 2014 – 14 October 2017
Preceded by	Mahendra Paswan
Succeeded by	Constituency abolished
Constituency	Siraha 5
In office 28 May 2008 – 28 May 2012
Preceded by	Constituency created
Succeeded by	Rajendra Kumar KC
Constituency	Kathmandu 10

Personal details
- Born: Ghanashyam Dahal; 11 December 1954 (age 71) Lewade, Dhikur Pokhari VDC, Pokhara, Nepal
- Party: Nepali Communist Party
- Other political affiliations: CPN (Maoist Centre) (1994–2018; 2021–2025); Nepal Communist Party (2018–2021); CPN (Unity Centre) (1991–1994); CPN (Mashal) (1984–1991); CPN (Masal) (1983–1984); CPN (Fourth Convention) (before 1983)
- Spouse: Sita Poudel (m. 1969; died 2023)
- Children: 4, including Renu
- Education: Institute of Agriculture and Animal Science, Tribhuvan University
- Website: cmprachanda.com
- Nickname: Prachanda

Pushpa Kamal Dahal (Note: Nepali: पुष्पकमल दाहाल) (born Ghanashyam Dahal; 11 December 1954), popularly known as Prachanda, (Note: Nepali: प्रचण्ड, pronounced [prʌˈt͡sʌɳɖʌ], transl. "fierce")) is a Nepalese politician. He is a member of House of Representatives elected from Eastern Rukum. He has been the prime minister of Nepal for three terms: from 2008 to 2009, from 2016 to 2017, and again from December 2022 until July 2024. His third term ended on 12 July 2024 after he lost a vote of confidence in parliament. He was then succeeded by K. P. Sharma Oli. After leaving office, Dahal became the Leader of the Opposition on 15 July 2024, remaining in that position until September 2025.

Having been drawn to left-wing politics after seeing severe poverty during his youth, Dahal joined the Communist Party of Nepal (Fourth Convention) in 1981, and later became general secretary of the Communist Party of Nepal (Mashal) in 1989. This party later became the Communist Party of Nepal (Maoist). Dahal was the leader of the CPN (M) during the country's civil war and subsequent peace process and the 1st Nepalese constituent assembly. In the 2008 elections, CPN(M) emerged as the largest party, and Dahal became prime minister in August of that year. He resigned from the post on 4 May 2009, after his attempt to sack the then army chief, Rookmangud Katawal, was opposed by then President Ram Baran Yadav. Dahal was sworn in as prime minister for a second time in 2016, as per an agreement to form a rotational government with the Nepali Congress, and resigned on 24 May 2017 to make way for Congress' Sher Bahadur Deuba. Following the 2022 general election, Dahal was sworn in as prime minister again in December 2022, with support from a coalition of parties including CPN (UML), Rastriya Swatantra Party and Rastriya Prajatantra Party. Dahal remained in power for 19 months, changing alliances between the UML and Congress three times, before he was ousted by a failed motion of confidence in the parliament on 12 July 2024.

== Early life ==
He was born Ghanashyam Dahal on 11 December 1954 in Lewade, Dhikur Pokhari, a VDC 20 km north from Pokhara, to Muktiram and Bhawani, a Brahmin Hindu family. He later changed his name during a matriculation examination to Pushpa Kamal (meaning: Lotus Flower). At the age of eight, his family migrated to the Terai, a fertile lowland region in southern Nepal, and settled in Chitwan District. In the 1950s, his father Muktiram moved to Indian state of Assam, where he worked as a firewood collector, and returned home in 1961. In 1971, Pushpa Kamal Dahal moved to Kathmandu for his studies, and was enrolled in Patan Multiple Campus for two years. He moved back to Chitwan and received a diploma of science in agriculture from Institute of Agriculture and Animal Science (IAAS) in Rampur, Chitwan. After completing studies and failing to find jobs in bureaucracy, Dahal became a schoolteacher in a village, where he worked until 1979. He was also a home teacher at the same village.

== Nepalese Civil War ==
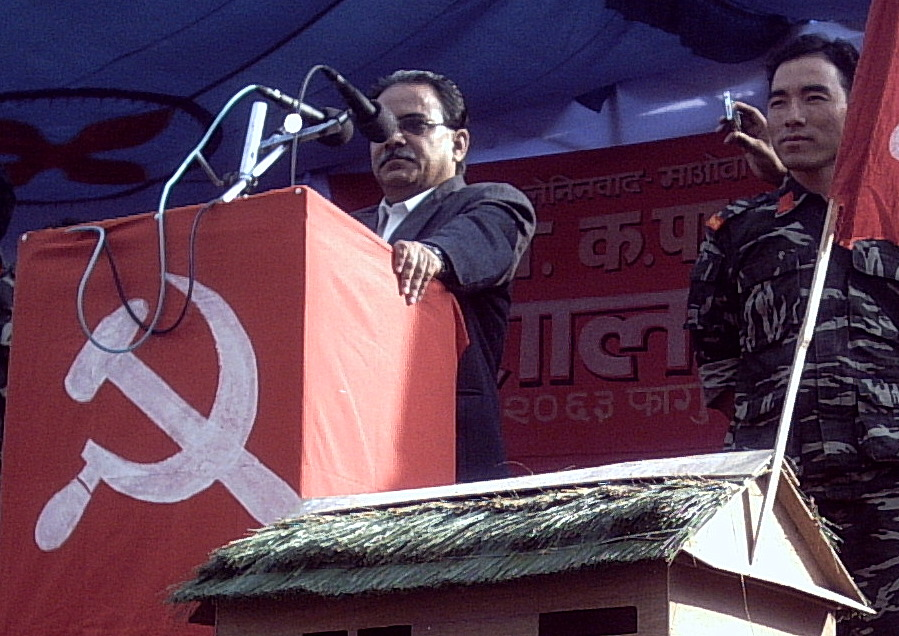
Dahal speaking at a rally in Pokhara

On 4 February 1996, Baburam Bhattarai gave the government, led by Nepali Congress Prime Minister Sher Bahadur Deuba, a list of 40 demands, threatening civil war if they were not met. The demands related to "nationalism, democracy, and livelihood" and included such line items as the "domination of foreign capital in Nepali industries, business and finance should be stopped", and "discriminatory treaties, including the 1950 Nepal-India Treaty, should be abrogated", and "land under the control of the feudal system should be confiscated and distributed to the landless and the homeless." After that, and until 26 April 2006, Dahal directed the military efforts of the CPN (Maoist Centre) towards establishing areas of control, particularly in the mountainous regions and in western Nepal. The 40 demands were whittled down to 24 in subsequent political negotiations.

In late 2004 or early 2005, relations between Dahal and Baburam Bhattarai soured. This was reportedly due to disagreement on power-sharing inside the party. Bhattarai was unhappy with the consolidation of power under Dahal. At one point, Dahal expelled Bhattarai from the party, though he was later reinstated. They later reconciled at least some of their differences. On 22 November 2005, Dahal and the Seven Party Alliance released a 'twelve-point agreement' that expressed areas of agreement between the CPN(M) and the parties that had won a large majority in the last parliamentary election in 1999. Among other points, this document stated that the dictatorial monarchy of King Gyanendra was the chief impediment to progress in Nepal. It claimed further that the Maoists were committed to human rights and press freedoms and a multi-party system of government. It pledged self-criticism and the intention of the Maoists and the Seven Parties to not repeat past mistakes.

On 26 April 2006, CPN (Maoist Centre) announced a ceasefire with a stated duration of 90 days. The move followed weeks of massive protests—the April 2006 Nepalese general strike— in Kathmandu and elsewhere that had forced King Gyanendra to give up the personal dictatorship he had established on 1 February 2005, and restore the parliament that had been dissolved in May 2002. A new government was then established by the Seven-Party Alliance. The parliament and the new government supported the ceasefire and started negotiations with the Maoists on the basis of the twelve-point agreement. The two sides agreed that a new constituent assembly would be elected to write a new constitution and decide the fate of the monarchy. The Maoists wanted this process to end with Nepal becoming declared as a republic.

== Premierships ==
=== First premiership ===
Dahal met for talks with Prime Minister Girija Prasad Koirala on 16 June 2006, which was thought to be his first visit to the capital Kathmandu in more than a decade. This meeting resulted in the Comprehensive Peace Accord to dissolve parliament, incorporate the CPN(M) into a new interim government, draft a new constitution, and disband the CPN(M)'s "people's governments" operating in rural Nepal. The two sides also agreed to disarm at a later date, under international supervision. On 18 September 2007, the CPN(M) left the coalition government ahead of the Constituent Assembly election, demanding the declaration of a republic by parliament, and a system of proportional representation in the election. The CPN(M) rejoined the government on 30 December 2007, after an agreement to abolish the monarchy following the election, and to have a system of partial proportional representation in the election. Following power-sharing discussions that lasted several months, Dahal was elected as prime minister by the Constituent Assembly on 15 August 2008, and he was sworn in as prime minister on 18 August 2008.

The decade-long war ultimately led the Maoists to Nepal's parliament. After winning a remarkable majority in the Constitutional Assembly elections, Dahal was nominated for the Prime Ministership by the party. In the April 2008 Constituent Assembly election, he was elected from Kathmandu constituency-10, winning by a large margin, and receiving nearly twice as many votes as his nearest rival, the candidate of the Nepali Congress. He also won overwhelmingly in Rolpa constituency-2, receiving 34,230 votes against 6,029 for Shanta Kumar Oli of the Communist Party of Nepal (Unified Marxist-Leninist), CPN(UML). With the CPN(M) appearing to have won the election, Dahal pledged that the party would work together with other parties in crafting the new constitution, and he assured the international community, particularly India and China, that the party wanted good relations and co-operation. He also said that the party had expressed its commitment to multi-party democracy through the election.

=== Second premiership ===
In August 2016 Pushpa Kamal Dahal was elected for a second stint as Prime Minister of Nepal. Dahal became the 24th prime minister since Nepal's adoption of multi-party democracy in 1990 and the eighth since the abolition of the monarchy in 2008. He resigned from the post of prime minister on 24 May 2017 and was succeeded by Sher Bahadur Deuba of the Nepali Congress in June.

=== Third premiership ===
Pushpa Kamal Dahal was appointed prime minister for the third time on 25 December 2022, following the 2022 Nepalese general election. He won the vote of confidence in the House on 10 January 2023 after 268 out of the present 270 members voted in favor of him.

Following Dahal's support for the candidature of Ram Chandra Poudel in the presidential election, the CPN (UML) withdrew its support from the government, and Dahal again joined hands with the Congress to revive the pre-election alliance.

Dahal condemned the actions of Hamas during the Gaza war, but also expressed support for Palestine and spoke in favor of a ceasefire, saying "we support the oppressed, those who deserve independence. We support Palestine".

On 4 March 2024, Dahal ended his coalition with the Nepali Congress and formed a new coalition with the CPN (UML) and other smaller parties. On 3 July however, the CPN (UML) left its coalition with Dahal and formed a coalition instead with the Nepali Congress. On 12 July, Dahal lost a vote of confidence in the House after 194 out of the present 258 members voted against his favour leading to the end of his third tenure as prime minister.

== Personal life ==
In 1969, Dahal married Sita Poudel (5 July 1954 – 12 July 2023) when he was fifteen. They had three daughters (including Renu Dahal) and a son.

In keeping with Marxist ideology, Dahal is an atheist, having stopped practicing Hinduism in his teenage years.

His house in the Chitwan District was torched by protesters during the 2025 Nepalese Gen Z protests.

== Publications ==
- Problems & Prospects of Revolution in Nepal: A Collection of Articles by Com. Prachanda and Other Leaders of the CPN (Maoist). Janadisha Publications.

Party political offices
Preceded by Mohan Vaidya	Leader of the Communist Party-Mashal; 1986–1991	Succeeded by Narayan Kaji Shrestha as Leader of the Communist Party-Unity Centre
New office	Leader of the Communist Party-Maoist Centre; 1994–present	Incumbent
Political offices
Preceded by Girija Prasad Koirala	Prime Minister of Nepal; 2008–2009	Succeeded by Madhav Kumar Nepal
Preceded by Khadga Prasad Oli	Prime Minister of Nepal; 2016–2017	Succeeded by Sher Bahadur Deuba
Preceded by Sher Bahadur Deuba	Prime Minister of Nepal; 2022–2024	Succeeded by Khadga Prasad Oli
