= Lokman Singh Karki =

Nepalese former government official

- लोकमान सिंह कार्की
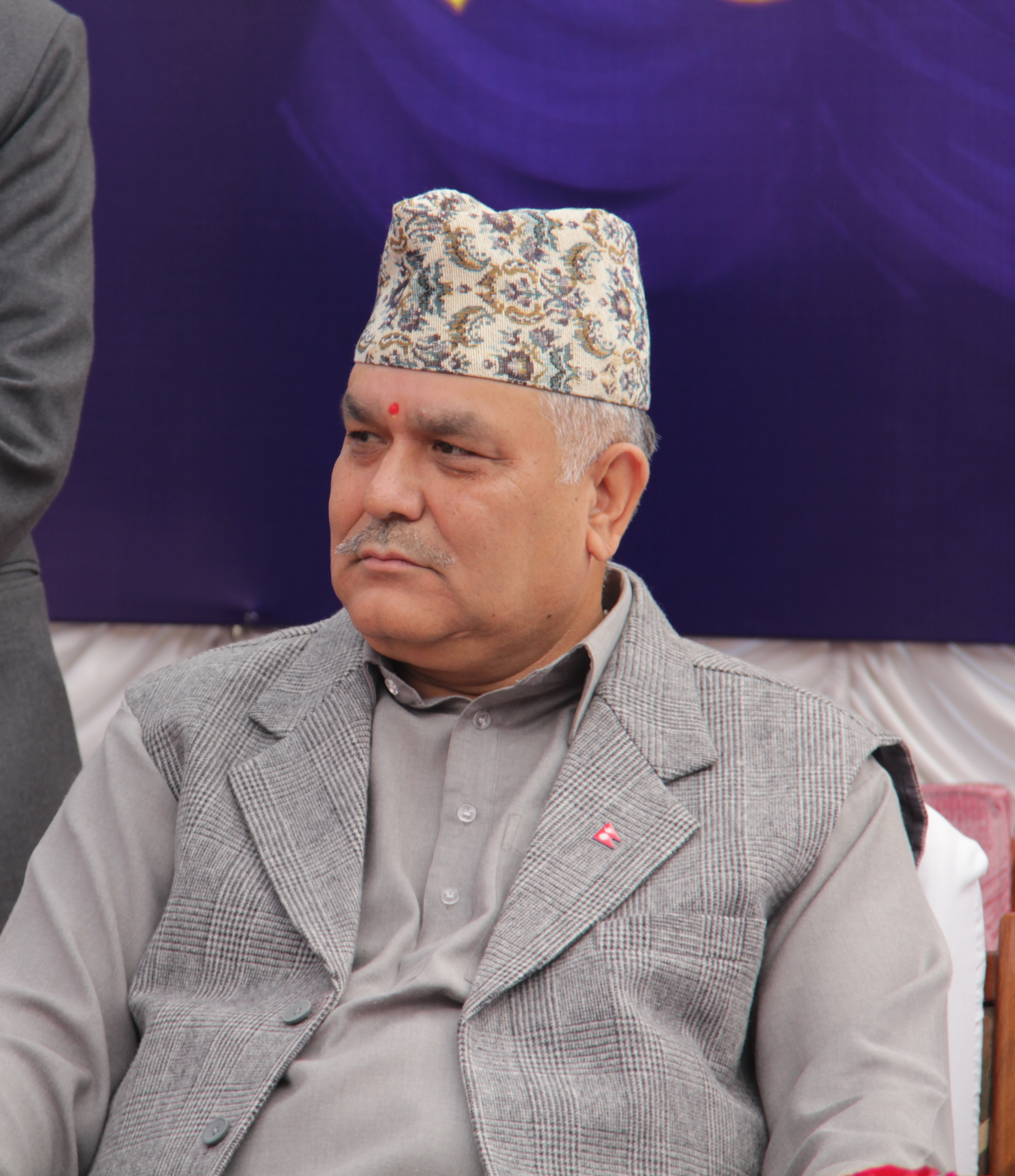

Chief Commissioner of Commission for Investigation of Abuse of Authority
- In office May 8, 2013 – October 20, 2016
- Appointed by: Ram Baran Yadav

Personal details
- Born: 5 April 1956 (age 70)
- Spouse: Sunita Karki

Lokman Singh Karki (Nepali: लोकमान सिंह कार्की, born April 5, 1956), is the former Chief Commissioner of Commission for Investigation of Abuse of Authority (CIAA) of Nepal. He assumed office in May, 2013. He was sacked from the post on 21 October 2016. In a landmark verdict, the Supreme Court on 8 January 2017 held that Mr. Karki was not qualified for the appointment to the office of the chief of the Commission for Investigation of Abuse of Authority.

== Personal Information ==
Lokman Singh Karki was born on April 5, 1956, in Kathmandu to Late General Bhupal Man Singh Karki and Late Durga Kumari Karki. He is married to Sunita Karki. He has one son and two daughters. He has received Master's Degree in Economics from Tribhuwan University and Master's Degree in Economics and Social Studies from Victoria University, United Kingdom.

== Civil Services ==
Karki, who was appointed under-secretary at the then palace secretariat in 1984 through royal edict, joined civil service in 1990 after the reinstatement of democracy. If Karki’s earlier six years of service at the then palace secretariat is excluded, he does not meet the required criteria for holding the position.

He joined the civil service in 1984 as an Under-Secretary of the State Council and served till 2009 in different capacities. He worked as an Under Secretary from 1984 to 1993 in various capacities. He was a Joint Secretary of the Government of Nepal from 1993 to 2001 when he served in the Ministry of Finance in different capacities. He worked as a Convener and Chief of the Revenue Advisory Committee and Central Monitoring Unit in the Ministry of Finance. He also held the position of Director General of the Department of Customs. He was the first Director General of the Department of Revenue Investigation. He served as the Secretary of Government of Nepal from 2001 to 2006. As the Secretary, he worked at the Ministry of Information and Communications, Office of the Prime Minister and Council of Ministers, Ministry of Health, Ministry of Population and Environment and Ministry of Water Resources. He then served as the Chief Secretary of Government of Nepal from 2006 to 2009.

== Impeachment Motion ==
On 19 October 2016, 157 MPs of CPN-UML and CPN (Maoist Centre) filed impeachment motion against Lokman Singh Karki at the Parliament Secretariat on the ground of his or her failure to fulfil his or her duties of office because of serious violation of the constitution and law, incompetence or misconduct or failure to discharge the duties of office honestly or serious violation of the code of conduct. As per the Constitutional provisions of Nepal, after the commencement of impeachment proceedings, the person in question shall not be allowed to discharge the duties of his or her office pending the settlement of such proceedings.

== Controversies ==
=== Indian Interference in Nepal ===
Lok Man has been accused of using Indian Spy Agency to persuade Nepalese politicians to appoint him as the chief of CIAA. The committee of senior political leaders that had recommended Lok Man's appointment and the then President of Nepal Dr. Ram Baran Yadav who appointed Lok Man have been accused of acting at the R&AW (India's external spy agency)'s behest. After the CIAA opened a probe against Kanak Dikshit, the journalist publicly said RA&W had been behind Karki’s appointment. After the impeachment motion was moved, the Republic and Kantipur media groups alleged that Indian Ambassador Ranjit Rae had lobbied to save Karki. Numerous articles published in Nepalese media also cite instances of power misuse by Lok Man that clearly benefited India in matters of dispute with Nepal.

=== Appointment as the Commissioner of CIAA, 2013 ===
Karki was controversially appointed as the Chief Commissioner of CIAA on May 8, 2013, by President Rambaran Yadav on the recommendation of the Constitutional Council for a term of six years. He was accused of suppressing the People's Movement II and was recommended by Rayamajhi Aayog for criminal proceedings. He was the chief secretary of the government under the direct rule of Former King Gyanendra Shah, and faced massive criticisms from different civil society members, media and political parties including Nepali Congress and CPN (UML). The Girija Prasad Koirala-led government, formed after the success of the 2006 movement, had also decided to sack him from the position of chief secretary and disqualify him from holding any public position in future “for using state apparatus against the pro-democratic protesters”. He also faced allegations that he was involved in various scandals, including a gold smuggling case, when he was working as the director-general at Tribhuvan International Airport. He has also been charged several times, although informally, by many civil servants of misusing his power. He has also been allegedly charged for controlling and informally making decisions of the Nepal Medical Council misusing his post and power. On 19 September 2016,157 lawmakers of CPN (UML) and CPN Maoist-Centre filed an impeachment motion against the Karki. However, the impeachment motion was never submitted for a vote in Parliament. The Special Bench of the Supreme Court, constituting Justices Ishwor Prasad Khatiwada, Dr. Ananda Mohan Bhattarai, and Anil Kumar Sinha, had that the appointment of Mr. Karki was unconstitutional as Mr. Karki lacked requisite legal and moral qualifications for the post of the Chief Commissioner of the CIAA. The Court among others held that Mr. Karki did not have 20 years of experience in the government in the field of development, law, engineering, finance as required by the Constitution and importantly lacked "high moral standing" required by the Constitution. In holding that Mr. Karki lacked high moral standing, the Court held that he himself was charged with corruption by the CIAA for alleged smuggling of gold while he headed Internal Revenue Department; was found guilty of human rights violations and abuse of official powers of the Chief Secretary during the suppression of people's movement of April 2006; and lying to the Court regarding his experience as the Chief Secretary of the government of Nepal (although the government had replaced Karki with a new chief secretary in 2006, Mr. Karki had lied to the Court that he remained as the Chief Secretary until his resignation in 2007).

=== Get Well Soon Lokman ===
On 27 July 2016, the party protested against the chief of CIAA who did not appear at the meeting of Good Governance and Monitoring Committee (GGMC) of the Parliament held at Singha Durbar citing health problems. The GMCC had invited Lokman Karki and the other commissioners to discuss the accusations that the CIAA had interfered in MD & MS entrance examination at Kathmandu University against the principal of academic jurisdiction by holding the examinations on their own. In the letter to the committee he stated that he had a throat infection and doctors had advised him not to speak for a week.

=== Interference in Medical Education Sector ===
Lokaman has been accused of interfering in medical education sector from time to time for his personal and family gains. During his leadership at CIAA, CIAA had interfered in many decisions of Nepal Medical Council including allocation of seats to medical colleges. The Kist Medical College, promoted by his brother Balman Singh Karki, has received privileged treatment despite having mixed reputation either as a center for learning or a medical facility.

Manmohan Memorial Institute of Health Sciences, where majority of the shareholders are CPN-UML members, the CIAA had written to the Tribhuvan University asking it to make arrangements for granting affiliation to it. The Government is currently working to acquire the MMHIS for the Manmohan Memorial National Academy of Health Sciences.

=== Face to face with Govinda KC ===
Dr Govinda KC, orthopaedic surgeon of Tribhuvan University Techching hospital, who has staged hunger-strikes from time to time demanding reforms in Medical Education demanded impeachment and investigation of properties of Lokman. Dr KC accused Karki of protecting corrupt people in medical education sector and breaching his jurisdiction to interfere into Kathmandu University. He also accused Karki of obstructing overall process of reform of medical education including merit-based admission and ceiling on fees to serve business interests of people close to him. In the response, CIAA issued official statement alleging Dr KC was mentally sick person and he needed medical help. It angered citizens and political parties who have been in solidarity with Dr KC on his hunger-strikes for medical education reform.

== See also ==
- Commission for Investigation of Abuse of Authority (CIAA), Nepal
