= Chyangli =

Coordinates: 27°58′N 84°27′E

Chyangli च्याङली
- Former Village development committee
- Location in Nepal Chyangli (Nepal)
- Country: Nepal
- Provinces: Gandaki Province
- District: Gorkha District

Population (1991)
  - Total: 5,612
- Time zone: UTC+5:45 (Nepal Time)

Chyangli is a former village development committee currently located in Palungtar municipality of Gorkha District in the Gandaki Province (previously Gandaki Zone) of northern-central Nepal. At the time of the 1991 Nepal census it had a population of 5,612 and had 1066 houses in the town.
