= Chumanuwri Rural Municipality =

Tsum Nubri चुम नुब्री गाँउपालिका
- Rural municipality
- Location in Nepal Tsum Nubri (Nepal)
- Coordinates: 28.518191°N 84.846204°E
- Country: Nepal
- Province: Gandaki
- District: Gorkha District
- Established: 10 March 2017

Government
  - Type: Rural council

Area
  - Total: 1,648.65 km^{2} (636.55 sq mi)
  - Rank: 4th largest (Nepal); 1st largest (Gandaki)

Population (2011)
  - Total: 6,923
  - Density: 4.199/km^{2} (10.88/sq mi)
- Time zone: UTC+5:45 (Nepal Time)
- Website: chumanuwrimun.gov.np

Tsum Nubri Rural Municipality (Nepali: चुमनुब्री गाउँपालिका) is a rural municipality (Gaunpalika) situated at the borderline of Nepal and china in Gorkha District in Gandaki Province of Nepal. It is divided into 7 wards.

On 10 March 2017, the government of Nepal implemented a new local level administrative structure merging the former VDCs. TsumNubri is one of these 753 local units.

== Demographics ==
At the time of the 2011 Nepal census, TsumNubri Rural Municipality had a population of 7,417. Of these, 54.7% spoke Tamang, 33.7% Gurung, 6.7% Yolmo, 3.5% Nepali, 0.3% Sign language and 0.8% other languages as their first language.

In terms of ethnicity/caste, 55.4% were Tamang, 39.5% Gurung, 1.7% Hill Brahmin, 1.3% Ghale, 0.7% Kami, 0.6% Chhetri, 0.3% Thakuri and 0.6% others. A unique ethnic group of people called Nubripa and Tsumbas are the residents of Nubri and Tsum Valley. Nubri Valley lies on the foot of Mt. Manaslu (8th highest mountain in the world).

This ethnic group lives beyond Ekle Bhatti, in the villages of Chumling and Nile.

In terms of religion, 93.2% were Buddhist, 4.0% Hindu, 2.4% Christian and 0.3% others.

In terms of literacy, 33.6% could both read and write, 4.1% could read but not write and 62.2% could neither read nor write.
