= Chhoprak =

Chhoprak छोप्र्याक
- Village development committee
- Location in Nepal Chhoprak (Nepal)
- Coordinates: 28.06°N 84.58°E
- Country: Nepal
- Zone: Gandaki Zone
- District: Gorkha District

Population (1991)
  - Total: 6,306
- Time zone: UTC+5:45 (Nepal Time)

Chhoprak is a village development committee in the Gorkha District in the Gandaki Zone of northern-central Nepal. At the time of the 2011 Nepal census, it had a population of 5893 (2608 males and 3285 females) and had 1531 houses.
