= Deurali, Gorkha =

Coordinates: 27°56′N 84°33′E

Deurali देउराली
- City
- Location in Nepal Deurali (Nepal)
- Country: Nepal
- Zone: Gandaki Zone
- District: Gorkha District

Population (1991)
  - Total: 4,800
- Time zone: UTC+5:45 (Nepal Time)

Deurali is a Village Development Committee in Gorkha District in the Gandaki Zone of northern-central Nepal. At the time of the 1991 Nepal census it had a population of 4,800 and had 984 houses in the town.
