= Palumtar =

Palumtar पालुङटार
- Municipality
- Location in Nepal Palumtar (Nepal) Palumtar (Tibet)
- Coordinates: 28°03′N 84°30′E
- Country: Nepal
- Zone: Gandaki Zone
- District: Gorkha District

Population (2011)
  - Total: 23 461
- Time zone: UTC+5:45 (Nepal Time)
- Postal code: 3401
- Area code: 064

Palumtar is a municipality in Gorkha District in the Gandaki Zone of northern-central Nepal. It was named after the former Village Development Committee which now is part of it. At the time of the 1991 Nepal census the VDC had a population of 6,982 and had 1358 houses in the town. The municipality has 23 461 inhabitants according to the census of 2011.
