= Dhuwakot =

Coordinates: 27°56′N 84°59′E

Dhuwakot धुवाकोट
- Village development committee
- Dhuwakot
- Interactive map of Dhuwakot
- Country: Nepal
- Zone: Bagmati Zone
- District: Dhading District
- Province: Bagmati
- Municipality: Nilkhantha

Government
  - Type: Mayor–council government
  - Ward President: Namaraj Duwadi

Population (1991)
  - Total: 4,270
  - Religions: Hindu Buddhist
- Time zone: UTC+5:45 (Nepal Time)

Dhuwakot is a village in Nilkhantha Ward 14 in the Bagmati Province of central Nepal.

In the 1991 Nepal census, the village had a population of 4,270 and 781 houses.

The village population largely consists of the Sapkota, Nepali, Tamang, Gurung and Ghimire castes.

== Notable people ==
Abjanath Sapkota, Former VCD President
