= Khoplang =

Khoplang खोप्लाङ
- Former Village development committee
- Location in Nepal Khoplang (Nepal)
- Coordinates: 28.03°N 84.55°E
- Province: Gandaki Province
- District: Gorkha District

Population (1991)
  - Total: 5,227
- Time zone: UTC+5:45 (Nepal Time)

Khoplang is a former village development committee in Palungtar municipality of Gorkha District in the Gandaki Province (previously Gandaki Zone) of northern-central Nepal. At the time of the 1991 Nepal census it had a population of 5,227 and had 1054 houses in the town. Former Prime Minister of Nepal Baburam Bhattarai was born here.
