= Commission for the Investigation of Abuse of Authority =

Anti-corruption body of Nepal

- अख्तियार दुरुपयोग अनुसन्धान आयोग

Agency overview
- Formed: February 11, 1992; 34 years ago
- Headquarters: Kathmandu
- Agency executive: Prem Kumar Rai, Chief Commissioner
- Website: ciaa.gov.np

The Commission for Investigation of Abuse of Authority (CIAA; Nepali: अख्तियार दुरुपयोग अनुसन्धान आयोग) is an apex constitutional body for corruption control for the Government of Nepal. The fundamental function of the Commission for Investigation of Abuse of Authority (CIAA) is to prevent corruption within the Nepalese government. The Commission is the only body to investigate, prosecute and bring actions against officials accused of corruption or maladministration.

The Constitution of Nepal has empowered CIAA to investigate and probe cases against the people holding any public office and their associates who are alleged to indulge in the abuse of authority by way of corruption. As a constitutional body, the authority vested on CIAA are as per the Article 238 and 239 of the Constitution of Nepal. Prem Kumar Rai is the Chief Commissioner of the Commission for Investigation of Abuse of Authority. Commissioners are Kishor Kumar Silwal, Jaya Bahadur Chand, Dr. Hari Poudel, Dr. Sumitra Shrestha Amatya.

The CIAA will initiate investigations against all public officials if the complaint is made in writing or in the media or through any source related to allegations of abuse of power.

== History ==
Commissioner Raj Narayan Pathak resigned on February 15, 2019 after news reports of corruption surfaced about a Medical College License. The commission has sued a case against Pathak for the case. He is accused of having taken 8.7 million rupees as bribes to settle a corruption claim in Nepal Engineering College.

The Commission for the Investigation of Abuse of Authority (CIAA) has initiated legal proceedings against 1,545 individuals and organizations in 201 corruption cases during 2023/24. The total compensation sought exceeds Rs 8.40 billion. According to the CIAA's 34th annual report, which was released on October 1, 2024, a total of 201 cases were filed in the Special Court throughout this year. The majority of cases are based on illegal benefits or losses.

== Former Chief Commissioners ==
The following have held the post of the Chief Commissioners.

List of Chief Commissioners
No.	Name	Took office	Left office
1	Anirudra Prasad Singh	28 December 1977	12 May 1985
2	Basudev Sharma	14 May 1985	8 November 1990
3	Janardanlal Mallik	11 February 1991	1 July 1994
4	Radharaman Upadhyaya	19 January 1995	9 February 1997
5	Ram Prasad Shrestha	11 February 1997	26 March 1997
6	Madhusudan Prasad Gorkhali	9 April 1998	23 January 2000
7	Suryanath Upadhyay	3 November 2000	3 November 2006
8	Lokman Singh Karki	8 May 2013	20 October 2016
9	Deep Basnyat	22 May 2017	12 February 2018
10	Nabin Kumar Ghimire	20 September 2018	13 September 2020
11	Prem Kumar Rai	3 February 2021	Present
