= United Nations Security Council Resolution 1921 =

United Nations Security Council resolution

UN Security Council Resolution 1921
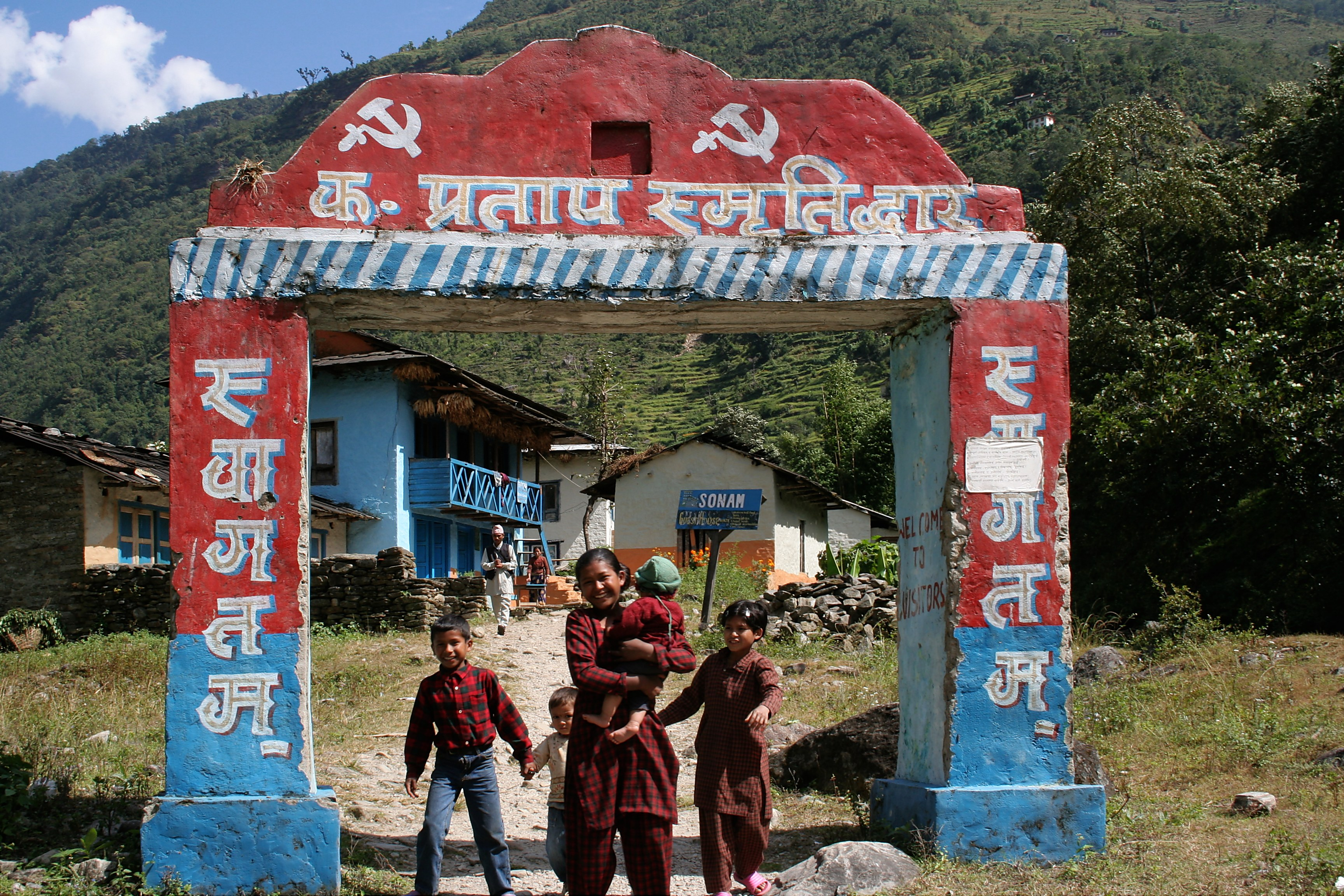
- Family in a Maoist controlled valley in Nepal
- Date: 12 May 2010
- Meeting no.: 6,311
- Code: S/RES/1921 (Document)
- Subject: The situation in Nepal
- Voting summary: 15 voted for; None voted against; None abstained
- Result: Adopted

Security Council composition
- Permanent members: China; France; Russia; United Kingdom; United States
- Non-permanent members: Austria; Bosnia–Herzegovina; Brazil; Gabon; Japan; Lebanon; Mexico; Nigeria; Turkey; Uganda

United Nations Security Council Resolution 1921, adopted unanimously on May 12, 2010, after recalling resolutions 1740 (2007), 1796 (2008), 1825 (2008), 1864 (2009), 1879 (2008) and 1909 (2009), the Council extended the mandate for the United Nations Mission in Nepal (UNMIN) until September 15, 2010 and stressed that arrangements should be made for the withdrawal of the mission by that date.

The Security Council recalled the Comprehensive Peace Accord between the Government of Nepal and the Unified Communist Party of Nepal (Maoist) and expressed its support for that agreement. It was concerned that the deadline for the promulgation of a new constitution was May 28, 2010 and that both parties had yet to reach a consensus or extend the tenure of the 1st Nepalese Constituent Assembly. The Nepalese parties were co-operating with the United Nations in areas such as monitoring of weapons and the discharge of disqualified army personnel.

The mandate of UNMIN was extended for a further four months at the request of the Nepalese government, taking into account the completion of some aspects of the mandate and the ongoing verification process. The Nepalese parties were urged to take full advantage of UNMIN in support of the peace process. It was acknowledged by the Council that the measures were originally conceived as short-term rather than long-term solutions and that UNMIN was urged to begin preparations for its withdrawal.

Both the Nepalese government and Unified Communist Party of Nepal (Maoist) were called upon to implement a timetable for the integration and rehabilitation of Maoist army personnel, ensure the safety of United Nations personnel and continue the transition to a long-term solution to enable Nepal to move a democratic future. The resolution, drafted by the United Kingdom, concluded by requesting the Secretary-General Ban Ki-moon to report by September 1, 2010 on the implementation of the current resolution.

== See also ==
- Comprehensive Peace Accord
- List of United Nations Security Council Resolutions 1901 to 2000 (2009–2011)
- Nepalese Civil War
