= United Nations Security Council Resolution 1909 =

UN Security Council Resolution 1909
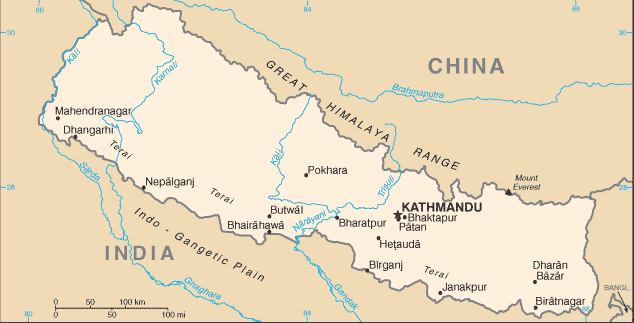
- Nepal
- Date: 21 January 2010
- Meeting no.: 6,262
- Code: S/RES/1909 (Document)
- Subject: The situation in Nepal
- Voting summary: 15 voted for; None voted against; None abstained
- Result: Adopted

Security Council composition
- Permanent members: China; France; Russia; United Kingdom; United States
- Non-permanent members: Austria; Bosnia–Herzegovina; Brazil; Gabon; Japan; Lebanon; Mexico; Nigeria; Turkey; Uganda

United Nations Security Council Resolution 1909, adopted unanimously on January 21, 2010, after recalling resolutions 1740 (2007), 1796 (2008), 1825 (2008), 1864 (2009) and 1879 (2008), the Council extended the mandate for the United Nations Mission in Nepal (UNMIN) until May 15, 2010 at the request of Nepal, deciding that it should also end on this date and further requiring UNMIN to hand over residual responsibilities including the monitoring of weapons and armed personnel.

The Council welcomed the continuing peace process in the country, calling on the Government and the Unified Communist Party of Nepal (Maoist) to implement the integration and rehabilitation of Maoist army personnel also by the May 15 withdrawal date. The resolution also required all parties to advance the peace process and facilitate the completion of the Mission's outstanding tasks.

UNMIN had been present in Nepal since 2007, however during the passing of Resolution 1909, the Secretary-General Ban Ki-moon warned that the peace process was in danger due to mistrust amongst the political parties in the country.

== See also ==
- Comprehensive Peace Accord
- List of United Nations Security Council Resolutions 1901 to 2000 (2009–2011)
- Nepalese Civil War
