= MALBATT =

Malaysia Battalion
- Batalion Malaysia
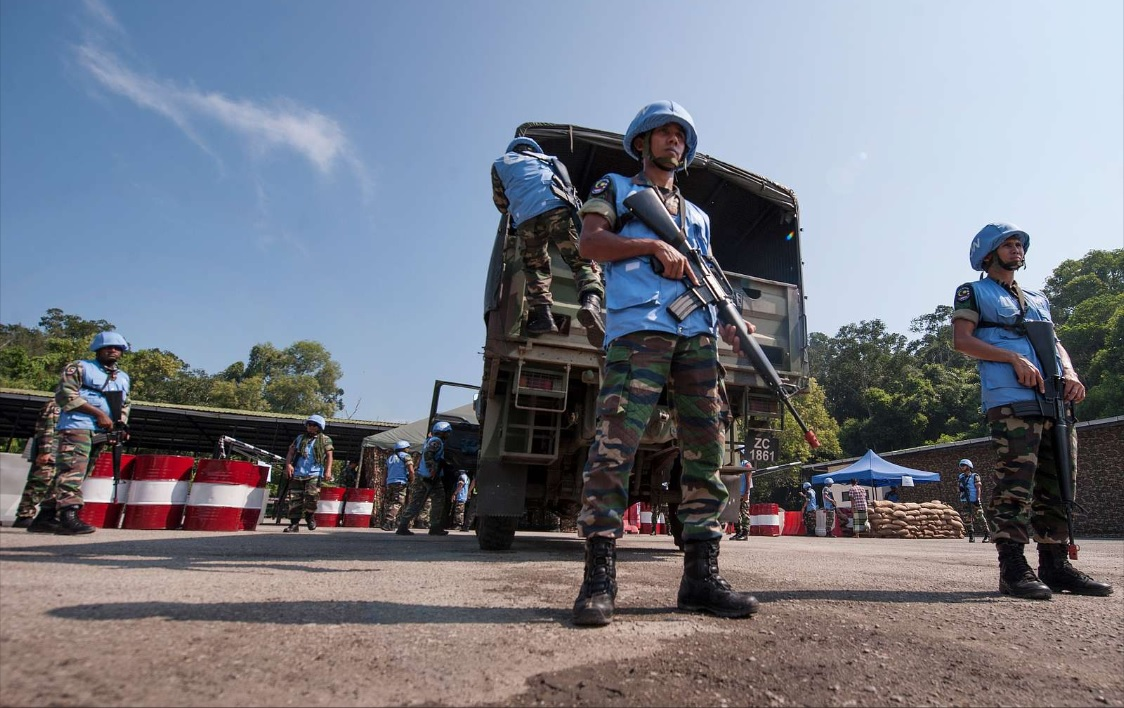
- Malaysian peacekeeping forces during the Exercise Keris Aman 2015 with US Indo-Pacific Command at Segenting Camp, Port Dickson, Negeri Sembilan, Malaysia
- Active: 16 September 1963 – present
- Country: Malaysia
- Allegiance: United Nations
- Branch: Malaysian Armed Forces; Royal Malaysia Police
- Type: Deployment
- Role: Peacekeeping
- Nickname: MALBATT
- Engagements: Various peacekeeping missions for the United Nations, see below

The Malaysia Battalion (Abbr.: MALBATT; Malay: Batalion Malaysia) is the Malaysian military battalion including personnel from the Royal Malaysia Police (RMP) serving overseas as part of a United Nations (UN) peacekeeping force.

== History ==
=== Early foundation ===
The peacekeeping contingent traced its history as the successor of the former Malayan Special Forces (MSF) of the Federation of Malaya, which had been involved in the United Nations Operation in the Congo (UNOC) from 1960 until 1963. From 1988 until 1991, the Malaysian contingent sent its military observers to the United Nations Iran–Iraq Military Observer Group (UNIIMOG). One of the first major deployment for the MALBATT contingent after the federation formation was during the United Nations Transition Assistance Group (UNTAG) in Namibia from 1989 until 1990 to observe the withdrawal of South African Defence Force (SADF) and disbandment of the South West African Territorial Force (SWATF) in the South African Border War.

=== 1990s ===
Through the Cambodian conflicts in the 1990s, MALBATT was first deployed with only two personnel for the United Nations Advance Mission in Cambodia (UNAMIC); to oversee a ceasefire in the country before further additional MALBATT troops, consisting of 2,119 personnel for the United Nations Transitional Authority in Cambodia (UNTAC), were deployed to maintain law and order and rebuild essential Cambodian infrastructure during the transitional period. In 1991, MALBATT was dispatched as part of the United Nations Mission for the Referendum in Western Sahara (MINURSO) to observe the implementation of ceasefire between the Polisario Front and Moroccan troops. From 1992 until 1993, MALBATT military personnel were deployed to the United Nations Iraq–Kuwait Observation Mission (UNIKOM). Along the same year in 1991 until 1995, MALBATT troops were dispatched to the United Nations Angola Verification Mission II (UNAVEM II) to enforce a ceasefire in the Angolan Civil War. From 1993, four MALBATT officers were sent for the United Nations Military Liaison Team (UNMLT), which was established for a single period of six months to maintain close liaison with the government of Cambodia and report to the UN Secretary-General on matters affecting security in the country and assist the government in dealing with residual military matters related to the Paris Peace Agreements.

Further MALBATT troops consisting of 3,206 personnel including from the Royal Malaysia Police (RMP) were deployed as part of the United Nations Operation in Somalia II (UNOSOM II) from 1993. This contingent served to monitor ceasefire in the country, providing protection for UN personnel and to escort and protecting the deliveries of humanitarian supplies. Troops from MALBATT were also involved in Operation Gothic Serpent, during which they engaged the forces of the Somali National Alliance (SNA) in the battle of Mogadishu to rescue surviving American Rangers trapped in the hostile territory after their helicopters were shot down; despite incurring casualties throughout the mission, the MALBATT team succeeded in rescuing survivors. Between 20–24 military officers and 35 police officers of the MALBATT team were attached to the UN Observer Mission of the United Nations Operation in Mozambique (ONUMOZ) from 1993 until 1994 to monitor ceasefire, decommissioning of weapons, withdrawal of foreign troops, and disbanding of private and irregular armed groups, among other things, as a result of the Mozambican Civil War. From 1993 until 1997, MALBATT also contributing troops for the United Nations Observer Mission in Liberia (UNOMIL), the United Nations Observer Mission in Sierra Leone (UNOMSIL) from 1998, and the United Nations Mission in Sierra Leone (UNAMSIL) from 1999 to 2005.

Along the same year in 1993, Malaysia's participation in the peacekeeping operation in the former Yugoslavia through the United Nations Protection Force (UNPROFOR) during the Yugoslav Wars involving the deployment of three MALBATT battalions consisting of 4,369 troops both from the military and police; along with additional two contingents of Malaysia Contingent (MALCON) through Implementation Force (IFOR) and Stabilisation Force (SFOR) placed under the directive of North Atlantic Treaty Organization (NATO) following a mandate to protect Bosnia and Herzegovina after the Dayton Agreement signed in 1995. Both Malaysia and its neighbour of Indonesia (Garuda Contingent) were the only two countries from Southeast Asia that contributing both of their military and police personnel to the UN forces for the mission. Through this, MALBATT were part of the United Nations Mission in Bosnia and Herzegovina (UNMIBH) until 1998. From May–June 1994, MALBATT observers drawn from the mission of MINURSO were deployed to the United Nations Aouzou Strip Observer Group (UNASOG); led by Colonel B. Mazlan where they meet with the Libyan Arab Jamahiriya authorities to supervise the withdrawal process of Libyan forces from the Aozou Strip as a result of the International Court of Justice (ICJ) decision on the Libya–Chad Territorial Dispute case.

MALBATT is among the personnel contributor to the United Nations Angola Verification Mission III (UNAVEM III) from February 1995 until June 1997, contributing 19 military observers and 20 civilian police. Further troops were contributed to the United Nations Observer Mission in Angola (MONUA). From April 1998 until April 1999, MALBATT Brigadier-General Tengku Ariffin Mohammed became the Chief Military Observer for the United Nations Mission of Observers in Tajikistan (UNMOT). The 1999 East Timorese crisis saw the further participation of Malaysian peacekeepers in both the International Force East Timor (INTERFET) and the United Nations Mission in East Timor (UNAMET); with the objective to aiding the mission carry out its tasks and facilitate the implementation of humanitarian aid operations. Subsequently, its military members were assigned as interpreters for the United Nations Transitional Administration in East Timor (UNTAET).

=== 2000s ===
From 2000 until 2008, Malaysian peacekeepers were dispatched to the United Nations Mission in Ethiopia and Eritrea (UNMEE). Between 2002 until 2005, MALBATT military personnel and police personnel were deployed to the United Nations Mission of Support to East Timor (UNMISET); to which the mission led by Lieutenant-General Khairuddin Mat Yusof from 2003 to 2005. From September 2003, MALBATT troops deployed for the United Nations Mission in Liberia (UNMIL) to support the implementation of the ceasefire and the subsequent peace process of Second Liberian Civil War, including the disarmament, demobilisation, reintegration and repatriation (DDRR) of combatants. From 2004, Malaysian peacekeepers began hosting peace talks between the Moro Islamic Liberation Front (MILF) and the Philippine government in the Moro conflict which was followed by the formation of International Monitoring Team (IMT) led by Malaysia. Malaysian peacekeepers were also part of the contributing nations for the Aceh Monitoring Mission (AMM) led by the European Union (EU) to oversee the peace process in Aceh between the Indonesian government and Free Aceh Movement (GAM).

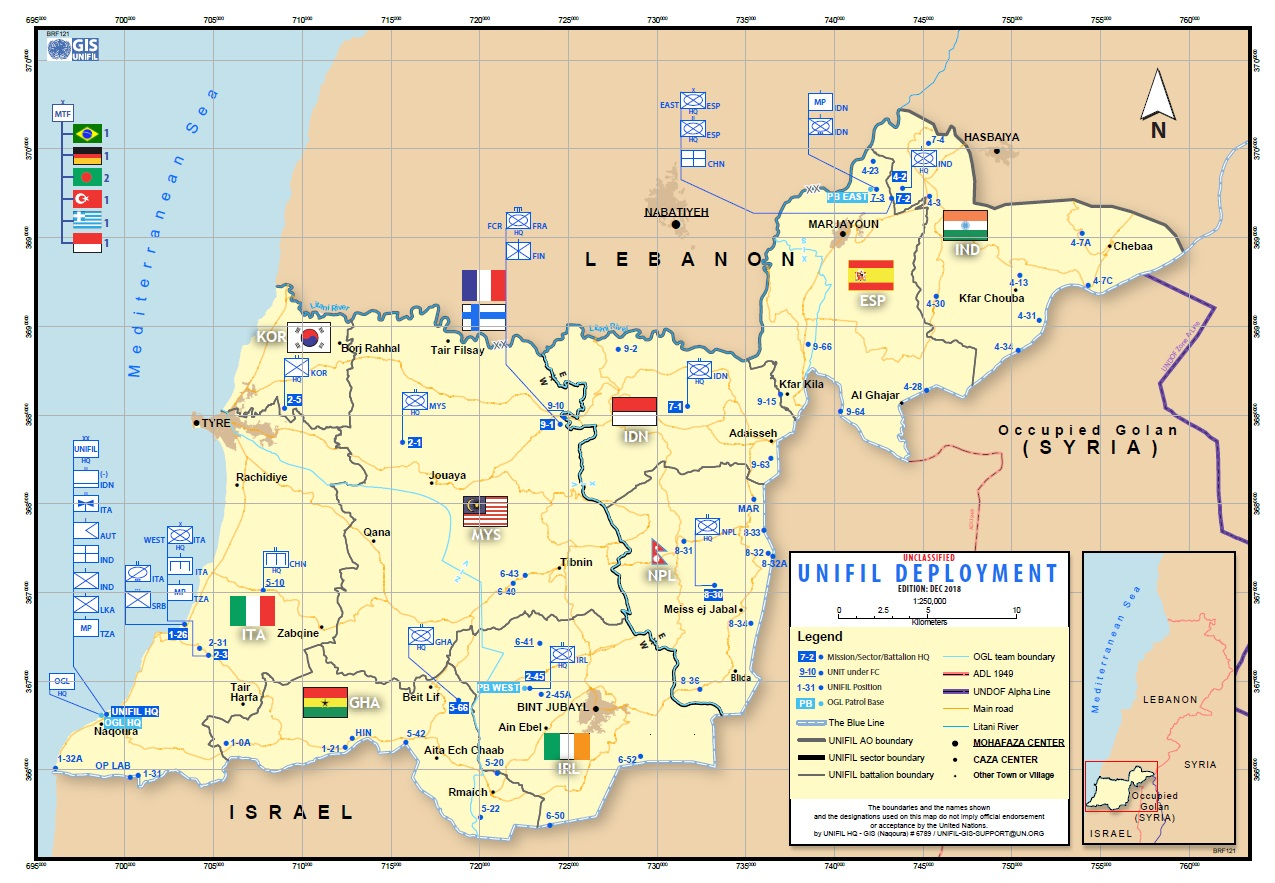
MALBATT positions within the United Nations Interim Force in Lebanon (UNIFIL) in 2018.

From June 2004 until December 2006, MALBATT military personnel deployed to the United Nations Operation in Burundi (ONUB). In the aftermath of the 2006 East Timorese crisis, MALBATT forces were deployed as part of United Nations Integrated Mission in East Timor (UNMIT) through the Operation Astute led by Australia. The contingent involved in providing assistance in human resource development activities through various training programs in East Timor efforts to rebuild their country. Since 2007, the Malaysian government has authorised the participation of Malaysian Armed Forces (MAF) through MALBATT to join other countries peacekeeping forces to enforce Resolution 1701 of the United Nations Security Council as part of the United Nations Interim Force in Lebanon (UNIFIL). By 2008, neighbouring Royal Brunei Armed Forces (RBAF) also form a part of MALBATT forces in Lebanon. Until May 2024, a total of five Malaysian peacekeepers have died during the mission. MALBATT military and police personnel have also been deployed to the United Nations–African Union Mission in Darfur (UNAMID) from 2007 until 2020. In 2009, fourteen officers from the Ministry of Defence (MINDEF), which is part of the MALBATT contingent took part as arms monitor for the United Nations Mission in Nepal (UNMIN).

=== 2010s, 2020s–present ===
Further Malaysia's participation in the International Security Assistance Force (ISAF) in Afghanistan in 2010 were placed under the directive of NATO; which is similar as the MALCON in Bosnia and Herzegovina through the previous IFOR and SFOR mission under NATO. From 2019, MALBATT troops were deployed to the UN Mission to Support the Hodeidah Agreement (UNMHA). Further in 2023, two MAF officers were deployed for the United Nations Interim Security Force for Abyei (UNISFA).

== Deployments ==
Location(s)	Operation	MAF and RMP Deployment	Period
Iran; Iraq	UNIIMOG	MALBATT Contingent: * Military observers	August 1988 – March 1991
Namibia	UNTAG	MALBATT Contingent	April 1989 – March 1990
Iraq	UNOSGI	MALBATT Contingent	1991 – 1992
Iraq; Kuwait	UNIKOM	MALBATT Contingent: * Military observers	1992 – 2003
Western Sahara	MINURSO	MALBATT Contingent: * Experts on mission	April 1991 – present
Angola	UNAVEM II	MALBATT Contingent	June 1991 – February 1995
Cambodia	UNAMIC	MALBATT Contingent	October 1991 – March 1992
Bosnia and Herzegovina	UNMLOY	MALBATT Contingent	1992 – 1996
Cambodia	UNTAC	MALBATT Contingent	March 1992 – September 1993
Mozambique	ONUMOZ	MALBATT Contingent	December 1992 – December 1994
Bosnia and Herzegovina	UNPROFOR	MALBATT Contingent	1993 – 1995
Somalia	UNOSOM II	MALBATT Contingent	March 1993 – March 1995
Liberia	UNOMIL	MALBATT Contingent	September 1993 – September 1997
Cambodia	UNMLT	MALBATT Contingent	1993 – 1994
Chad	UNASOG	MALBATT Contingent: * Military observers	May – June 1994
Tajikistan	UNMOT	MALBATT Contingent: * Chief military observers	December 1994 – May 2000
Angola	UNAVEM III	MALBATT Contingent	February 1995 – June 1997
Bosnia and Herzegovina	UNMBIH	MALBATT Contingent	December 1995 – December 2002
Bosnia and Herzegovina	IFOR	MALBATT Contingent	December 1995 – December 1996
Bosnia and Herzegovina	SFOR	MALBATT Contingent	December 1996 – 1998
Angola	MONUA	MALBATT Contingent	June 1997 – February 1999
Sierra Leone	UNOMSIL	MALBATT Contingent	July 1998 – October 1999
Afghanistan	UNSMA	MALBATT Contingent	1998 – 1999
Kosovo	UNMIK	MALBATT Contingent	June 1999 – present
Sierra Leone	UNAMSIL	MALBATT Contingent: * Police forces	October 1999 – December 2005
East Timor	UNTAET	MALBATT Contingent	October 1999 – May 2002
DR Congo	MONUSCO	MALBATT Contingent	November 1999 – present
Liberia	UNOL	MALBATT Contingent	1999
East Timor	UNAMET	MALBATT Contingent	1999
East Timor	INTERFET	MALBATT Contingent	1999 – 2002
Ethiopia; Eritrea	UNMEE	MALBATT Contingent	July 2000 – July 2008
East Timor	UNMISET	MALBATT Contingent	May 2002 – May 2005
Liberia	UNMIL	MALBATT Contingent	September 2003 – present
Burundi	ONUB	MALBATT Contingent	May 2004 – January 2007
Philippines	IMT	MALBATT IMT Contingent: * Armed forces * Police forces	October 2004 – June 2022
East Timor	UNMIT	MALBATT Contingent	August 2006 – December 2012
Nepal	UNMIN	MALBATT Contingent: * Arms monitor	January 2007 – January 2011
Lebanon	UNIFIL	MALBATT Contingent	2007 – present
Sudan	UNAMID	MALBATT Contingent	July 2007 – December 2020
South Sudan	UNMISS	MALBATT Contingent: * Police forces	July 2011 – present
Sudan	UNISFA	MALBATT Contingent: * Two armed forces members	2012 – present
Yemen	UNMHA	MALBATT Contingent	January 2019 – present

== Units involved ==
Malaysian Armed Forces

- Malaysian Army
- Royal Malaysian Navy
- Royal Malaysian Air Force

Royal Malaysia Police

== In the media ==
MALBATT became the subject matter in 1994 documentary film, Misi Keamanan (Peacekeeping Mission), produced by Filem Negara Malaysia and 2023 military war film, MALBATT: Misi Bakara, directed by Adrian Teh.

== See also ==
- Malaysia and the United Nations
