= United Nations Security Council Resolution 1939 =

UN Security Council Resolution 1939
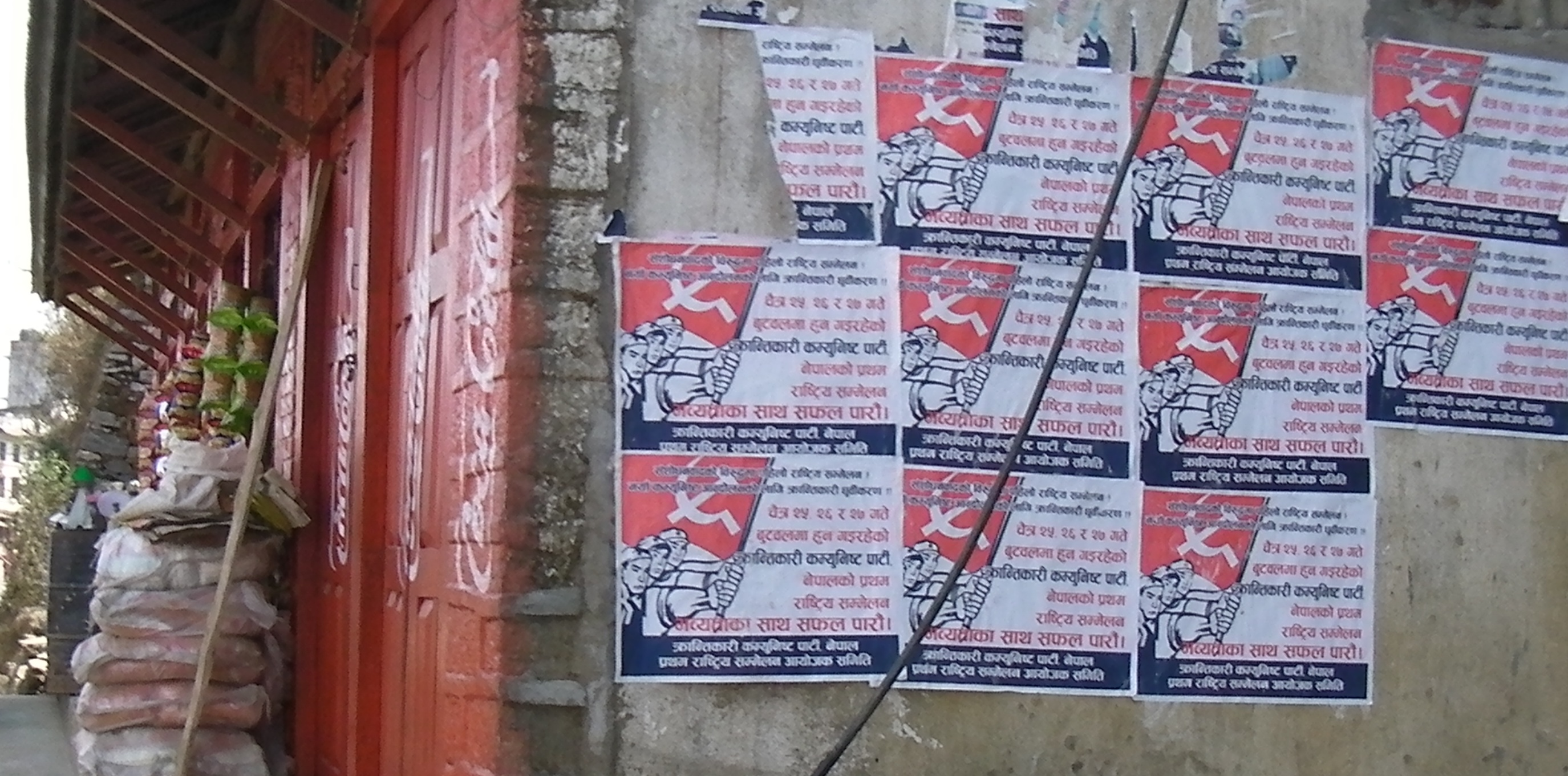
- Communist posters in Nepal
- Date: 15 September 2010
- Meeting no.: 6,385
- Code: S/RES/1939 (Document)
- Subject: The situation in Nepal
- Voting summary: 15 voted for; None voted against; None abstained
- Result: Adopted

Security Council composition
- Permanent members: China; France; Russia; United Kingdom; United States
- Non-permanent members: Austria; Bosnia–Herzegovina; Brazil; Gabon; Japan; Lebanon; Mexico; Nigeria; Turkey; Uganda

United Nations Security Council Resolution 1939, adopted unanimously on September 15, 2010, after recalling previous resolutions on the situation in Nepal, including Resolution 1921 (2010), the Council extended the mandate of the United Nations Mission in Nepal (UNMIN) until January 15, 2011 amid concern over rising political tensions in the country.

The extension of UNMIN would be the seventh and last. In his report, the Secretary-General Ban Ki-moon said he was not in favour of repeated extensions of the mission due to "persistent and unfounded criticism" that impaired its ability to carry out its mandate, in accordance with Resolution 1740 (2007).

== Resolution ==
=== Observations ===
In the preamble of the resolution, the Council reaffirmed the Comprehensive Peace Accord and subsequent agreements towards a durable settlement. It recognised the will of the Nepalese people for peace and democracy and expressed a readiness to continue to support the peace process. Noting that a deadline for the promulgation of a new constitution was extended until May 28, 2011, the Council also noted recent political tensions in the country. It called on all political parties in Nepal to resolve their differences through negotiations, while recognising the role of civil society, the protection of human rights and roles of the marginalised groups in the transition.

=== Acts ===
The mandate of UNMIN was extended after a request from the Nepalese government, taking into account that some elements of its mandate had been completed and ongoing work concerning the monitoring of arms management. Furthermore, the Council also decided that UNMIN's mandate would terminate on January 15, 2011 and leave the country, and called upon all parties to ensure the completion of UNMIN's mandate by that date.

The resolution urged the Nepalese government and Unified Communist Party of Nepal (Maoist) to implement an agreement from September 13, 2010 in addition to a plan for the integration and rehabilitation of Maoist army personnel. All Nepalese political parties were encouraged to co-operate, compromise, and achieve consensus in order for the country to continue the transition to democratic future. Furthermore, the parties were asked to ensure the safety and freedom of movement for UNMIN personnel.

Finally, the Secretary-General Ban Ki-moon was requested to report on discussions between the United Nations, the caretaker Nepalese government, and political parties by October 15, 2010.

== See also ==
- Comprehensive Peace Accord
- List of United Nations Security Council Resolutions 1901 to 2000 (2009–2011)
- Nepalese Civil War
