= Chad–Libya border =

International border

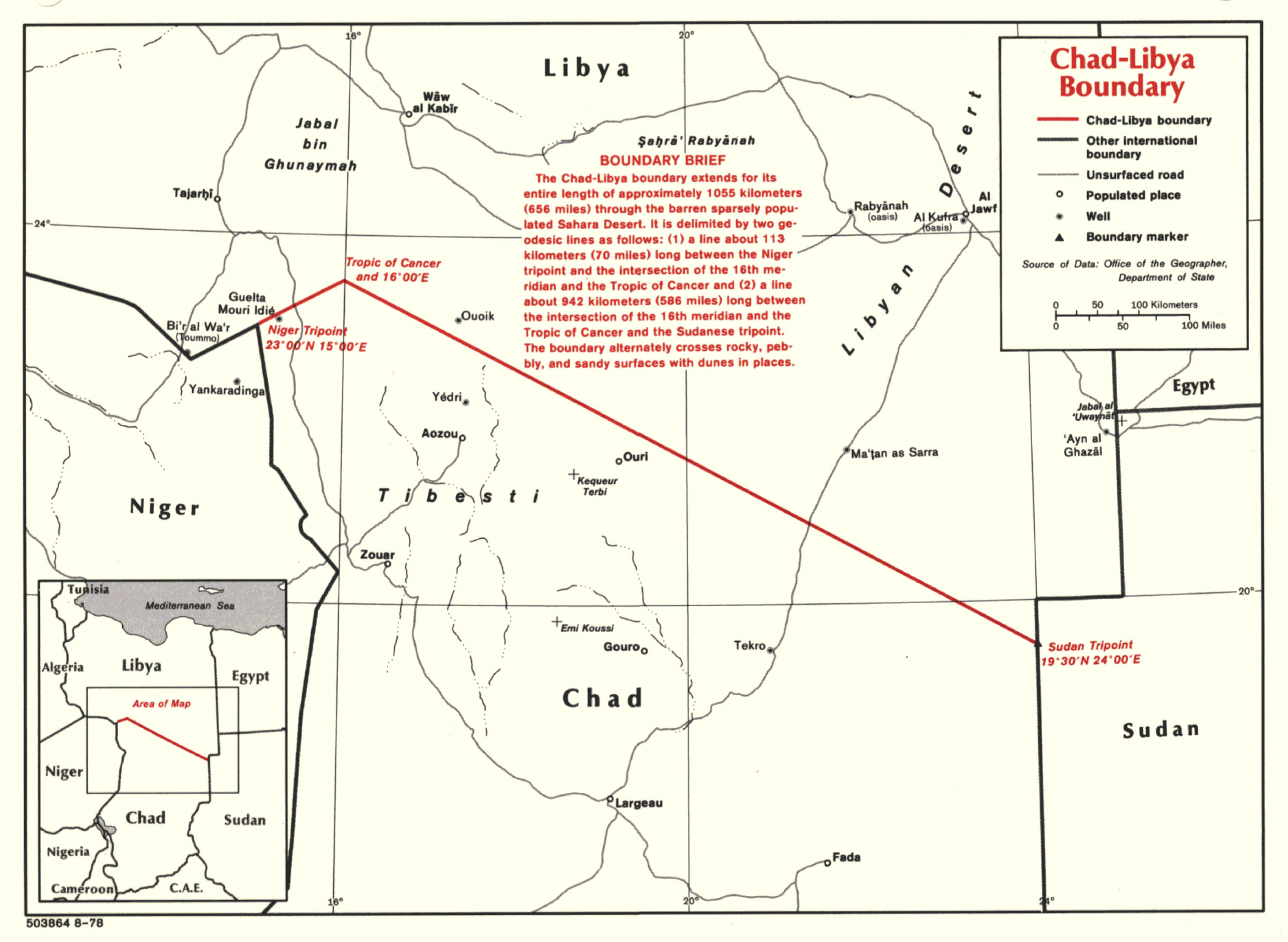
Map of the Chad-Libya border

The Chad–Libya border is 1,050 km (652 mi) in length and runs from the tripoint with Niger in the west, to the tripoint with Sudan in the east.

== Description ==
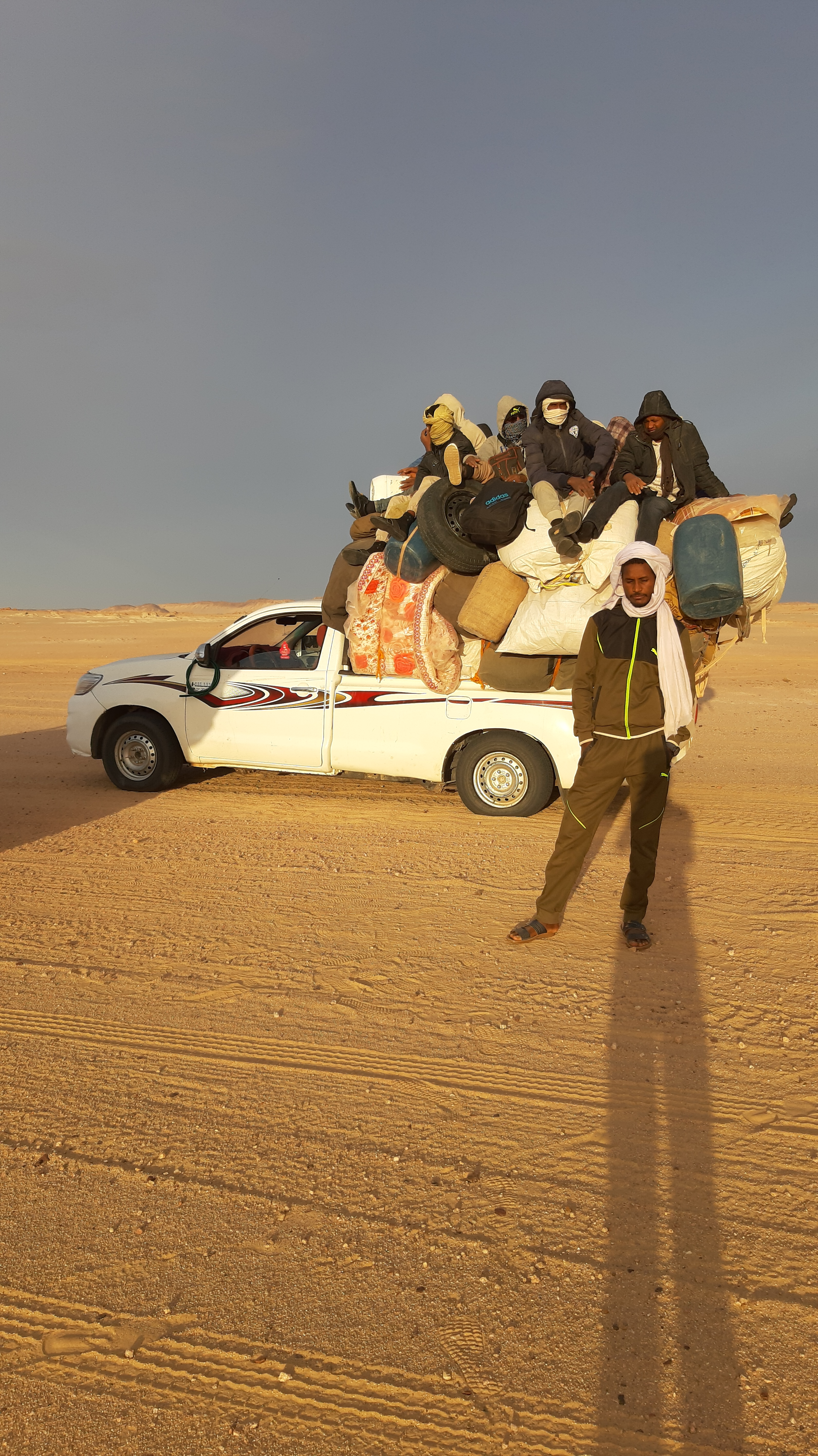
Travelling near the Chad-Libya border

The border consists of two straight line segments. The first is a continuation of the Libya–Niger border; this section continues from the tripoint in a straight line for about 113 km (70 mi) up to the Tropic of Cancer. The border then turns to the southeast, running for 942 km (586 mi) to the tripoint with Sudan. The border lies wholly within the Sahara Desert, cutting through parts of the Tibesti Mountains in the far west. The remote Bikku Bitti mountain is located very close to the border on the Libyan side.

== History ==
The Ottoman Empire had ruled the coastal areas of what is today Libya since the 16th century, organised into the Vilayet of Tripolitania, with an ill-defined border in the south. The modern border with what is now Chad first emerged during the Scramble for Africa, a period of intense competition among European powers in the later 19th century for territory and influence in Africa. The process culminated in the Berlin Conference of 1884, in which the European nations concerned agreed upon their respective territorial claims and the rules of engagements. As a result of this, France gained control of the upper valley of the Niger River (roughly equivalent to the areas of modern Mali and Niger), and also the lands explored by Pierre Savorgnan de Brazza for France in Central Africa (roughly equivalent to modern Gabon and Congo-Brazzaville). From these bases the French explored further into the interior, eventually linking the two areas following expeditions in April 1900 which met at Kousséri in the far north of modern Cameroon. These newly conquered regions were initially ruled as military territories, with the two areas later organised into the federal colonies of French West Africa (Afrique occidentale française, abbreviated AOF) and French Equatorial Africa (Afrique équatoriale française, AEF).

=== British-French Agreement of 1899 ===
Britain and France had agreed between them on 21 March 1899 that east of the Niger River, French influence would extend no further north than that of a diagonal line running from the intersection of the Tropic of Cancer and the 16th meridian east to the 24th meridian east, thus creating the long line section of the modern Chad–Libya border.

The Ottomans protested this treaty and began moving troops into the southern regions of the Vilayet of Tripolitania. Italy meanwhile sought to emulate the colonial expansion of the other European powers, and they indicated their recognition of the above line to France on 1 November 1902. In September 1911 Italy invaded the Tripolitania, and the Treaty of Ouchy was signed the following year by which the Ottomans formally ceded sovereignty of the area over to Italy. The Italians organised the newly conquered regions into the colonies of Italian Cyrenaica and Italian Tripolitania and gradually began pushing further south. In 1934 they united the two territories into Italian Libya. Meanwhile, Britain and France had settled the border between AEF and Anglo-Egyptian Sudan (modern Sudan) in 1923–24, thus creating the modern Chad-Sudan border. In 1934 Britain and Italy confirmed the border between Italian Libya and Anglo-Egyptian Sudan, by which Britain ceded the Sarra Triangle to Italy, extending Libyan territory to the southwest and thereby creating the modern Libya-Sudan border and much of the modern Chad–Libya border.

=== Aouzou Strip ===
On 18 March 1931 France transferred the Tibesti Mountains from Niger (AOF) to Chad (AEF), thus completing what is now the Chad–Libya border. On 7 January 1935 France and Italy signed a treaty which shifted the boundary southwards; the area between the two boundaries became known as the Aouzou Strip, however this agreement was never formally ratified by both parties. During the North African Campaign of the Second World War Italy was defeated and its African colonies were occupied by the Allied powers, with Libya split into British and French zones of occupation. Libya was later granted full independence on 2 December 1951.

A Franco-Libyan treaty was signed on 1 August 1955 which recognised the existing boundary and confirmed French ownership of the Aouzou Strip. Chad later gained independence from France on 11 August 1960 and the border became an international frontier between two independent states.

The Aouzou strip shown in red

=== Libyan Border ===
In 1969 Muammar Gaddafi seized power in Libya and reignited the Libyan claim to the Aouzou Strip, bolstered by the possibility that the area could be rich in uranium. Gaddafi also began interfering in Chadian affairs, actively supporting FROLINAT anti-government forces in the first Chadian Civil War and moving troops into northern Chad. As relations between the two states deteriorated, various secret discussions were held; Gaddafi claimed that as part of these Chadian President François Tombalbaye had ceded the Strip to Libya in 1972, however the claimed cession was disputed and the precise details remain unclear. In 1975 Chadian President Goukouni Oueddei publicly denounced Libya's presence in the Strip. There followed the Chadian-Libyan conflict, which lasted until 1987, whereupon the two countries agreed to resolved the border dispute peacefully. In 1990 the Aouzou case was referred to the International Court of Justice, which ruled in 1994 that the Strip belonged to Chad.

Since then the situation on this remote border quietened considerably. However, in recent years the border has been the focus of renewed attention due to the ongoing instability in Libya since the overthrow of Gaddafi in 2011, the rise in the numbers of refugees and migrants crossing the Sahara, and also the discovery of gold in north-west Chad in the late 2000s-early 2010s which prompted an uncontrolled gold rush.

In March 2019 Chadian President Idriss Déby announced that the border would close, citing the crossing of the frontier by Libyan-based anti-government rebel groups into Chadian territory (most notably the Military Command Council for the Salvation of the Republic; French: Conseil de commandement militaire pour le salut de la République, abbreviated CCMSR) and the continuing instability caused by the civil war in Libya. As part of Operation Barkhane France has provided assistance to the Chadian Army with guarding the border, including launching air strikes against anti-government rebels.

== See also ==
- Aouzou Strip
- Chadian–Libyan conflict
- Chad-Libya relations
