= United Nations Security Council Resolution 926 =

UN Security Council Resolution 926
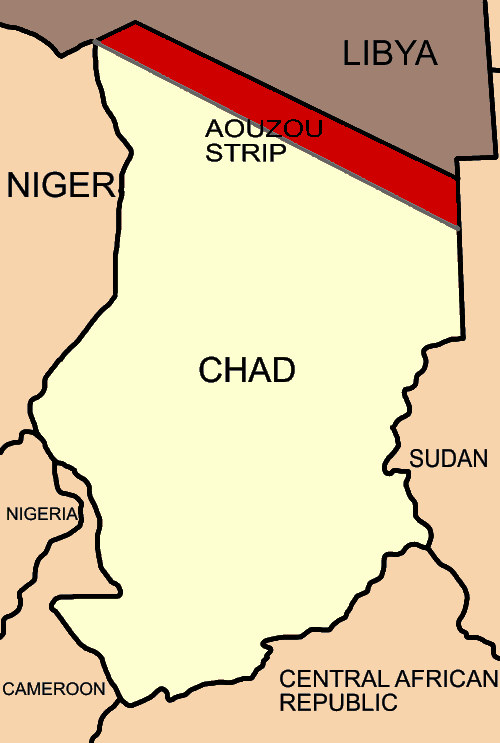
- Aouzou Strip region
- Date: 13 June 1994
- Meeting no.: 3,389
- Code: S/RES/926 (Document)
- Subject: Chad-Libyan Arab Jamahiriya
- Voting summary: 15 voted for; None voted against; None abstained
- Result: Adopted

Security Council composition
- Permanent members: China; France; Russia; United Kingdom; United States
- Non-permanent members: Argentina; Brazil; Czech Republic; Djibouti; New Zealand; Nigeria; Oman; Pakistan; Rwanda; Spain

United Nations Security Council resolution 926, adopted unanimously on 13 June 1994, after reaffirming Resolution 915 (1994), the Council commended the work of the United Nations Aouzou Strip Observer Group (UNASOG) and the co-operation of Libya and Chad and decided, with immediate effect, to terminate the UNASOG mission in the Aouzou Strip.

== See also ==
- Case Concerning the Territorial Dispute (Libya v. Chad)
- Chadian–Libyan conflict
- Foreign relations of Libya
- List of United Nations Security Council Resolutions 901 to 1000 (1994–1995)
