= Chad–Libya relations =

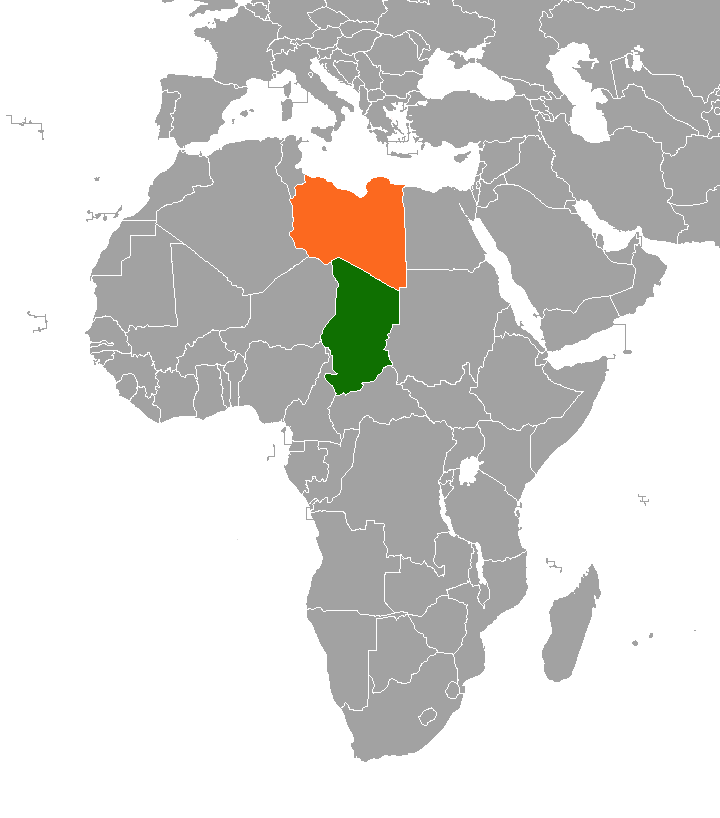

- Chad: Libya

Chad–Libya relations have arisen out of centuries from ethnic, religious, and commercial ties.

== History ==
=== 1960s ===
Under French and Italian colonial domination, respectively, Chad and Libya had diverged in orientation and development. But even after Chad's independence in 1960, many northerners still identified more closely with the people in Libya than with the southern-dominated government in N'Djamena. After seizing power in 1969, Libyan head of state Muammar Gaddafi reasserted Libya's claim to the Aozou Strip, a 100,000-square-kilometer portion of northern Chad that included the small town of Aozou. Libya based its claim on one of several pre-independence agreements regarding colonial boundaries, and it bolstered these claims by stationing troops in the Aozou Strip beginning in 1972.

Gaddafi's desire to annex the Aozou Strip grew out of an array of concerns, including the region's reported mineral wealth, including uranium. He also hoped to establish a friendly government in Chad and to extend Islamic influence into the Sahel through Chad and Sudan.

Chad's president Hissène Habré was vigorously helped by the former colonial power, France, which desired to put a limit on Libya's expansionist projects in an area with close ties to Paris. French support included sending troops to combat the Libyans in Chadian territory. In doing so, France was politically backed by the United States, also concerned with the increasing expansionism of Gaddafi.

A complex set of symbolic interests also underlay Libya's pursuit of territory and influence in the Sahel. Gaddafi's anticolonial and anti-imperialist rhetoric vacillated between attacks on the United States and a campaign focused on the postcolonial European presence in Africa. He hoped to weaken Chad's ties with the West and thereby reduce Africa's incorporation into the Western-dominated nation-state system. Forcing the revision of one of the colonially devised boundaries affirmed by the OAU in 1963 was a step in this direction—one that seemed possible in the context of the troubled nation of Chad, which OAU members dubbed the continent's "weakest link".

=== 1970s ===
Gaddafi attempted alliances with a number of antigovernment rebel leaders in Chad during the 1970s, including Goukouni, Siddick, Acyl Ahmat (a Chadian of Arab descent), and Kamougué, a southerner. Goukouni and Acyl were most sympathetic to Gaddafi's regional ambitions, but these two men clashed in 1979, leading Acyl to form the CDR. After Acyl's death in 1982, Libyan support swung strongly to Goukouni's GUNT. Libya intervened militarily in Chad in 1978 and 1979, starting the Chadian–Libyan conflict.

=== 1980s ===
In 1980, Libya intervened again in Chad's civil war, occupying most of the country including the capital of N'Djamena in December. On 6 January 1981, a joint communiqué was issued in Tripoli by Libyan Brotherly Leader Gaddafi and Chadian rebel leader Goukouni that Libya and Chad had decided "to work to achieve full unity between the two countries". Faced with both strong international condemnation and internal opposition from Chadian rebels, Gaddafi and Goukouni backpedaled, and their relations soon deteriorated when Goukouni tried to accommodate international and internal pressure to end the Libyan military presence. Eventually, on 29 October Goukouni demanded the Libyan forces be retreated by the year's end, and surprisingly quickly Gaddafi complied and had withdrawn all Libyan troops to the Aouzou Strip by 16 November. The FAN rebel faction led by Hissène Habré rose to power and in 1982 ousted Goukouni from N'Djamena, forcing his GUNT faction back to the north.

Habré was repelled by GUNT in December and January 1983, however, and eventually Gaddafi decided to support Goukouni's GUNT once more. A new Libyan intervention followed in June, though it was largely through material support of the GUNT offensive. France (under Operation Manta), the US and Zaire intervened on Habré's behalf and repulsed the Libyan-backed GUNT in late July.

By mid-1988 Gaddafi appeared more willing to come to an agreement with Habré than to continue to support Gaddafi's fractious allies, who had suffered losses at Habré's hands. Chadian and Libyan foreign ministers met in August 1988, and the two governments agreed to further talks. At the same time, Libyan troops remained in the Aozou Strip.

Steadily, relations among the two countries improved, with Gaddafi giving signs that he wanted to normalize relations with the Chadian government, to the point of recognizing that the war had been an error. In May 1988 the Libyan leader declared he would recognize Habré as the legitimate president of Chad "as a gift to Africa"; this led on 3 October to the resumption of full diplomatic relations between the two countries. The following year, on 31 August 1989, Chadian and Libyan representatives met in Algiers to negotiate the Framework Agreement on the Peaceful Settlement of the Territorial Dispute, by which Gaddafi agreed to discuss with Habré the Aouzou Strip and to bring the issue to the International Court of Justice (ICJ) for a binding ruling if bilateral talks failed. Therefore, after a year of inconclusive talks, the sides submitted in September 1990 the dispute to the ICJ.

Chadian-Libyan relations were further ameliorated when Libyan-supported Idriss Déby unseated Habré on 2 December. Gaddafi was the first head of state to recognize the new regime, and he also signed treaties of friendship and cooperation on various levels; but regarding the Aouzou Strip Déby followed his predecessor, declaring that if necessary he would fight to keep the strip out of Libya's hands.

=== 1990s ===
The Aouzou dispute was concluded for good on 3 February 1994, when the judges of the ICJ by a majority of 16 to 1 decided that the Aouzou Strip belonged to Chad. The court's judgement was implemented without delay, the two parties signing as early as 4 April an agreement concerning the practical modalities for the implementation of the judgement. Monitored by international observers, the withdrawal of Libyan troops from the Strip began on 15 April and was completed by 10 May. The formal and final transfer of the Strip from Libya to Chad took place on 30 May, when the sides signed a joint declaration stating that the Libyan withdrawal had been affected.

=== 2000s ===
In October 2007, four rebel groups in Chad signed a peace deal with their country's government, with Libyan leader Colonel Muammar Gaddafi hosting the talks. The presidents of Chad and Sudan were present to witness this as well.

On 9 August 2009, teams of ministers from Chad and Libya agreed seven deals intended to increase measures relating to security and trade as well as improve political co-operation between the nations. Chadian Prime Minister Youssouf Saleh Abbas and Libyan Prime Minister Baghdadi Mahmudi led the ministerial negotiations. Elsewhere and Chadian President Idriss Déby and Libyan leader Muammar Gaddafi came together on such as issues as saving the rapidly shrinking Lake Chad and working out how the African Union could become more involved in negotiating conflicts of African importance. In a further development, the Saif al-Islam Gaddafi-led Gaddafi International Foundation for Charitable Associations and Development, writing in the Oya newspaper, detailed further its intentions to resettle refugees from Chad in Libya and issued thanks to those who had assisted.

=== 2010s ===
Since the Libyan Civil War in 2011, relations between the two nations have worsened. In 2013 Chadian president Idriss Déby accused the new Libyan authorities of allowing Chadian mercenaries to establish camps in Libya from where they plotted attacks into northern Chad. Since the second Libyan civil war began between different factions in Libya, mercenaries from Chad and other countries in the region had been taking part in the conflict. In August 2016, the Libyan authorities closed their embassy in N'Djamena and recalled its ambassador, Mohammed Khalifa, at the decision of Chad. It came after the Chadian foreign ministry expelled 13 Libyan diplomats from Chad. According to a statement from the ministry, "We noticed that there are a huge number of administrative and military diplomats working in the embassy. Their stay in Chad is unjustified." Libya's internationally recognized Government of National Accord noted concerns about over-staffing of Libya's embassies abroad. In January 2017, Chad had closed its northern border along Libya as the country's descent into chaos would force some militant fighters to flee into Chad itself. As a result, Chad had ordered troop deployments at the border to make efforts to stop any militants fleeing into the country.

=== 2026 ===
On 21 February 2026, the Chadian-Libyan joint military force, which both countries view the initiative as an essential step to stabilize the frontier, curb illicit activities, and prevent security threats that undermine the safety of border communities. The two brigades in these joint forces are Saddam Haftar's 106th Brigade (Libya) and along with military officials from the Chadian side, worth noting, the forces were able together to take down rebellion of wardougou a Nigerian backed militia attempt. Where their leader was caught and killed on 27 February, which escalated until 1 March where the Libyan National Army and Chadian army carried successful operation into Niger..

While some local sources claim the involvement of the GNU in support of wardougou, such claims are unlikely and possible the movement was linked to the support of 'Joint Technical cooperation' – which is border protection security agreement including both Government of National Unity (Libya) and the Government of National Stability. Further supported by the meeting of March 5 between Chadian prime minister Tahir Isso Youssef which was involving appointing new ambassador and "emphasizing the importance of consolidating bilateral relations and supporting areas of joint cooperation in a way that serves the interests of both peoples and contributes to strengthening stability in the region."

== See also ==
- Chadian–Libyan conflict
