= United Nations Security Council Resolution 1864 =

UN Security Council Resolution 1864
- Location of Nepal
- Date: 23 January 2009
- Meeting no.: 6,074
- Code: S/2009/1864 (Document)
- Subject: The situation in Nepal
- Voting summary: 15 voted for; None voted against; None abstained
- Result: Adopted

Security Council composition
- Permanent members: China; France; Russia; United Kingdom; United States
- Non-permanent members: Austria; Burkina Faso; Costa Rica; Croatia; Japan; Libya; Mexico; Turkey; Uganda; Vietnam

United Nations Security Council Resolution 1864, adopted unanimously January 23, 2009, after recalling resolution 1740 (2007), 1796 (2008) and 1825 (2008) on the situation in Nepal, the Council extended the mandate of the United Nations Mission in Nepal (UNMIN), whose mandate expired that day, by another six months until July 23, 2009.

== Details ==
While agreeing to extend the current UNMIN at the request of the Nepalese government, the Security Council also endorsed Secretary-General Ban Ki-moon's proposal of a phased, gradual draw-down and withdrawal of UNMIN staff, and agreed with the Secretary-General that the current monitoring arrangements in Nepal could not be maintained indefinitely.

The Council called on the Nepalese Government to create the necessary conditions for UNMIN to complete their mission conditions at the end of their mandate in order for United Nations staff to begin withdrawal. The Council also requested that the Secretary-General submit a report no later than April 30, 2009, on the progress of implementation of the resolution.

== See also ==
- List of United Nations Security Council Resolutions 1801 to 1900 (2008–2009)
- Nepalese Civil War
- United Nations Mission in Nepal
