= Landergren =

Landergren is a Swedish surname: "land", land' + "gren",'branch'. Notable people with the surname include:

- Adelia Landergren (1889–1947), Swedish survivor from Titanic
- Nils Landergren (1924–1984), Swedish military officer

== See also ==
- Landgren
- Landegren
