= United Nations Security Council Resolution 915 =

UN Security Council Resolution 915
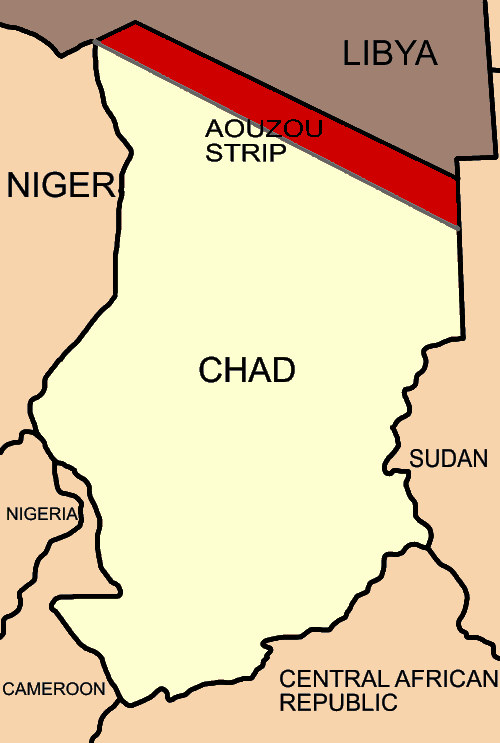
- Aouzou Strip region
- Date: 4 May 1994
- Meeting no.: 3,373
- Code: S/RES/915 (Document)
- Subject: Chad–Libya
- Voting summary: 15 voted for; None voted against; None abstained
- Result: Adopted

Security Council composition
- Permanent members: China; France; Russia; United Kingdom; United States
- Non-permanent members: Argentina; Brazil; Czech Republic; Djibouti; New Zealand; Nigeria; Oman; Pakistan; Rwanda; Spain

United Nations Security Council resolution 915 was adopted unanimously on 4 May 1994. While reaffirming Resolution 910 (1994), the Council, acting on a recommendation by the UN Secretary-General Boutros Boutros-Ghali, established the United Nations Aouzou Strip Observer Group (UNASOG) to supervise the withdrawal of Libyan forces from the Aouzou Strip following an International Court of Justice opinion rendered in the Libya–Chad Territorial Dispute case that the strip formed part of the territory of Chad.

The council noted that an agreement signed in Sirte, Libya, between the two countries provided for a presence of the United Nations to monitor the withdrawal by Libya, while announcing its intention to promote peaceful relations between both parties.

It was decided that UNASOG would be established for a single period of up to forty days, beginning from the adoption of the present resolution. It would consist of nine United Nations observers and six support staff to observe the implementation of the agreement. Co-operation from both parties with the Secretary-General Boutros Boutros-Ghali was urged, and in particular to grant it freedom of movement.

The council also recognised that UNASOG would need to travel to Libya by air and this would require an exemption from international sanctions placed on the country and in particular provisions of Resolution 748 (1992). Acting under Chapter VII of the United Nations Charter, the council decided that the provisions would not apply to the UNASOG mission, requesting the Secretary-General to inform the committee established in Resolution 748 of flights made, and to keep the Council updated on developments.

== See also ==
- Case Concerning the Territorial Dispute (Libya v. Chad)
- Chadian–Libyan conflict
- Foreign relations of Libya
- List of United Nations Security Council Resolutions 901 to 1000 (1994–1995)
