= United Nations Security Council Resolution 910 =

UN Security Council Resolution 910
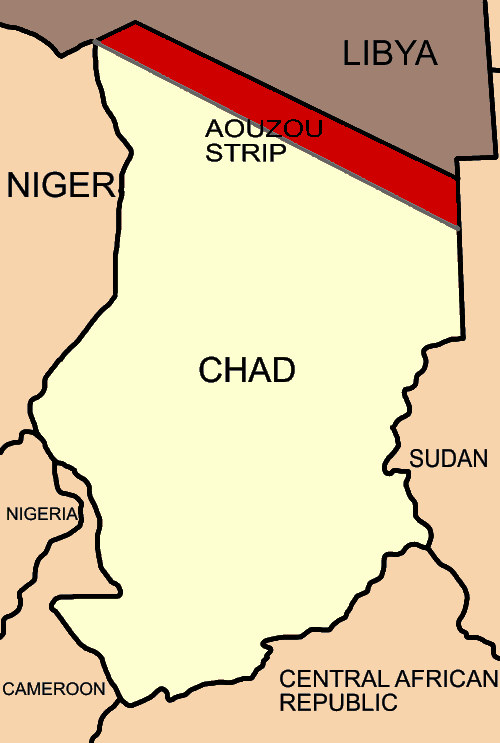
- Aouzou Strip (red)
- Date: 14 April 1994
- Meeting no.: 3,363
- Code: S/RES/910 (Document)
- Subject: Chad–Libya
- Voting summary: 15 voted for; None voted against; None abstained
- Result: Adopted

Security Council composition
- Permanent members: China; France; Russia; United Kingdom; United States
- Non-permanent members: Argentina; Brazil; Czech Republic; Djibouti; New Zealand; Nigeria; Oman; Pakistan; Rwanda; Spain

United Nations Security Council resolution 910, adopted unanimously on 14 April 1994, after considering a letter by the UN Secretary-General Boutros Boutros-Ghali advising of his intention to send a reconnaissance team to the Aouzou Strip disputed between Chad and Libya, the Council decided to exempt the reconnaissance mission from a provision in Resolution 748 (1992) that imposed international sanctions on Libya.

Acting under Chapter VII of the United Nations Charter, the Council recognised that the mission would require the use of United Nations aircraft which required exemption in order to monitor the Libyan withdrawal from the disputed area. The Council welcomed the agreement between the Government of Chad and Government of Libya at Sirte on 4 April 1994 concerning the implementation of the judgment delivered by the International Court of Justice on 3 February 1994 in the Libya–Chad Territorial Dispute case regarding the Aouzou Strip. The Secretary-General was requested to keep the Council informed on flights made under the current resolution.

== See also ==
- Case Concerning the Territorial Dispute (Libya v. Chad)
- Chadian–Libyan conflict
- Foreign relations of Libya
- List of United Nations Security Council Resolutions 901 to 1000 (1994–1995)
