= United Nations Aouzou Strip Observer Group =

- Abbreviation: UNASOG
- Formation: 4 May 1994
- Type: Peacekeeping mission
- Legal status: Concluded
- Headquarters: Aouzou Base
- Parent organization: UN Security Council
- Budget: $US64,471
- Website: peacekeeping.un.org/sites/default/files/past/unasog.htm

The United Nations Aouzou Strip Observer Group (UNASOG) was a United Nations observation mission that was deployed to the Aouzou Strip, in the Republic of Chad. Established in the wake of the Aouzou Strip dispute under Security Council Resolution 915 of 4 April 1994, the mission's mandate was "to verify the withdrawal of the Libyan administration and forces from the Aouzou Strip in accordance with the decision of the International Court of Justice", rendered on 3 February 1994 in the Libya–Chad Territorial Dispute case.

Deployed to the Aouzou Strip, in the Republic of Chad, between 4 May to 6 June 1994, the group consisted of only 15 personnel, of which nine were military and six civilian. Personnel were provided by Bangladesh, Ghana, Honduras, Kenya, Malaysia and Nigeria and were sourced mainly from the existing MINURSO mission. The mission's budget was US$ 64,471, which was obtained through the regular annual UN vote. The group was commanded by a Malaysian, Colonel Mazlan Bahamuddin. It was withdrawn after both parties to the dispute declared that the withdrawal from the area had been successfully concluded, with the mission being terminated by Security Council Resolution 1926. There were no fatalities amongst the deployed personnel.
