= Landgren =

Landgren is a Swedish surname: "land", land' + "gren",'branch'.

- Andreas Landgren
- Fritz Landgren
- Karin Landgren
- Nils Landgren (bobsledder) (1923–2002), bobsledder who competed in the early 1950s for Sweden
- Nils Landgren (musician) (born 1956), trombone player from Sweden
- Per Landgren

== See also ==
- Landegren
