= Landegren =

Landegren is a Swedish surname: "land", land' + "gren",'branch'. Notable people with the surname include:

- Kalle Landegren (born 1987), Swedish comic book creator, illustrator and artist
- Victor Landegren (1870–1940), Swedish military commander

== See also ==
- Landgren
- Landergren
