= Truth and Reconciliation Commission (Nepal) =

Truth commission

The Commission of Inquiry to Locate the Persons Disappeared during the Panchayat Period (1990–1991) is a truth commission established in Nepal in 1990 after the end of the autocratic Panchayat Regime by the first post-Panchayat Prime Minister Krishna Prasad Bhattharai. The commission was set up to examine allegations of human rights violations and inquire about enforced disappearances during the Panchayat system from 1961 to 1990. A report was officially submitted to the government in 1991, but it was made public only in 1994. The commission identified 35 persons disappeared on about one hundred studied cases. However, no alleged perpetrators were judged.

On 10 February 2015, the new Truth and Reconciliation Commission (TRC) was set up "to investigate on the cases of human rights violations and crimes against humanity", many years after the Comprehensive Peace Accord (CPA) between the Government of Nepal and then Nepal Communist Party (Maoist) was signed in November 2006.

== Background to the Commission of Inquiry ==
=== The panchayat system (1960–1990) ===
In early 1960s, Nepal's King Mahendra abolished the country's limited democratic government. In December 1960, he dissolved the Nepali Congress government, jailing all the cabinet members and a large number of workers for all parties. He proceeded to ban political parties and set up a system of “partyless” autocratic rule.

The growing popularity of the Prime Minister, B.P. Koilara, and the radical socialist line adopted by the Nepali Congress, which was detrimental to the interest of the feudal landlords and aristocratic families, were two main factors which led King Mahendra to extend his powers. Since the king is accepted as a “benevolent reincarnation” in Nepal, faith in the monarchy is high. The palace had the unique control of the army, which allowed this royal takeover.

The new constitution of 1962 established a non-party system under which the king exercised sole power: the panchayat system. The elected Prime Minister, members of Parliament and political opponents were arrested by the military.

The constitution adopted many features of the Rana system and the panchayat system was an institution of great antiquity. Historically and in accordance with Hindu religion, each caste group system of Nepal formed its own panchayat (council of elders): it was a sociopolitical organization based on a village level. King Mahendra wanted its incorporation at the national level, as an exponent of Nepalese culture. According to the king, “there are two institutions in Nepal, namely kingship and panchayat that are commonly known and understood by the people and that work for unity and stability and peaceful progress, and it is through these institutions that the edifice of Nepal’s progress has to be built”.

The panchayat system was a pyramidal structure running from village assemblies up to the National Parliament (Rastriya Panchayat).

Even when Mahendra's son, King Birenda, a Western liberal educated man, took power in 1971, all forms of political activities were prohibited and repression of political opposition groups continued.

=== Protests from the 1980s ===
The autocratic system remained in place until 1990 but the beginning of a civil disobedience campaign by the Nepali Congress Party for restoration of multi-party system started from the 1980s. The Communist Party, the other main political party, adopted both a policy of infiltration into the panchayat system and a policy of continuous struggle.

Public dissent against authoritarian rule, student demonstration and anti-regime activities grew along with rampant arrests of activists by the royal government. Students and youth, i.e. the intellectuals, were a strong base of protest against the government.

Under public pressure, King Birendra called for a national referendum in 1980 on the question of the system of government: retention of the existing panchayat system with suitable reforms, or the setting up of a multi-party system of government. The panchayat system won a narrow victory. Some democratic reforms were carried out and a third amendment was added to the constitution.

In May 1985, the banned Nepali Congress submitted a petition to the king signed by over three hundred thousand people, listing various local demands. After receiving no response from the king, the party decided to launch a civil disobedience movement which led to the arrest of thousands of political workers and their leaders.

A repressive policy was set up by the government as response to the popular movement, and especially to a series of bomb blasts in June 1985. In August 1985, the government passed the Destructive Crimes (Special Control and Punishment Act).

In 1990, popular pro-democracy protests suppressed by security forces resulting in deaths and mass arrests. This pressure forced the King to restore a multiparty system with parliamentary democracy.

== The commission ==
=== Establishment ===
After the end of the panchayat system, when the Nepalese king ruled without parliament, the new provisional government established a truth commission: the first post-panchayat Prime Minister, Krishna Prasad Bhattharai, issued an executive order to establish the Commission of Inquiry to Locate the Persons Disappeared during the Panchayat Period in 1990. The truth commission emerged as a result of protests against absolutism, in the transition to constitutional monarchy in 1990.

Due to controversy about the process of appointment of its members, the commission was dissolved almost immediately. The credibility of the commission was questioned because of the possible link between the chair of the commission and the prior regime: the appointment procedure referenced the abolished 1962 Panchayat Constitution rather than the new legal system.

The government then appointed a second commission with the same mandate, but through an acceptable process that considered the end of the panchayat system and the political changes of the country.

=== Mandate, goals, commissioners ===
The Commission was created to examine allegations of human rights violations during the panchayat system from 1961 to 1990, to investigate and identify the final places of detention of the disappeared and to identify additional victims.

The enquiry was led by four commissioners: Surya Bahadur Shakya as chair, Prakash Kafle, Basudev Dhungana and Dr. Sachche Kumar Pahadi.

=== Report and findings ===
A two-volume report was officially submitted to the government in 1991, but it was made public only in 1994 thanks to the pressure from civil society groups, including Amnesty International.

Today, the report is only available through the parliamentary secretariat and Nepal's national library.

The commission investigated about one hundred cases and identified a total of 35 persons "disappeared" at the hands of the state, five of whom were killed, and the rest declared “unknown”. The commission also acknowledged that there had been gross infringements of human rights, but it had no powers to name perpetrators or subpoena officials. The police were generally unresponsive to the commission's requests for information.

Despite local human rights groups urging the government to ensure that any persons implicated in human rights violations be brought to justice, no alleged perpetrators faced trial.

== Civil War (1996–2006) ==
Despite the work of the commission, mass disappearances continued in Nepal, particularly during the civil war from 1996 to 2006, opposing the government to the Unified Communist Party of Nepal (Maoist). The United Nations listed Nepal as the country with the most disappearances in 2003-2004. In February 1996, the Communist Party of Nepal (Maoist) (CPN-M) declared a "people's war" against the "ruling classes" which included the monarchy and the political parties. It gave a forty-point ultimatum to the government, asking particularly for a popular democracy. From that moment and during the next six years, the battle between government troops and Maoist guerrillas left thousands dead, paralyzed the economy and maintained a state of terror.

Initially, the CPN attacked police stations and then gradually as its influence extended, created militias. Meanwhile, the government settled for individual elimination of local communist cadres and other "enemies of the people" until 2000.

It was only in 2001 that the two groups started a discussion, after the massacre of the royal family: the king and several other family members were killed, further to a family dispute. The circumstances of death are not clear but Prince Dipendra killed his father and the others before committing suicide.

The rebels had three main demands: the abolition of the monarchy, the formation of a coalition government and the election of a constituent assembly. The government refused, and conflict resumed.

This time the attacks affected the garrisons of the royal army, which then entered into the conflict – it had not taken part to date. A state of emergency was declared after more than 100 people were killed in rebel and government operations in 2001.

From 1996 to 2006, the number of the dead is estimated at more than 13,000 and approximately 1,300 people were forcibly disappeared.

The Nepalese Maoist insurgency came to an end when the Maoist guerrillas leadership and the Seven-Party-Aliiance (SPA) signed a 12-point-understanding in New Delhi in November 2005. The Comprehensive Peace Agreement (CPA) in 2006 in Kathmandu gave an official start to a “peace process”.

== Truth and Reconciliation Commission (2015) ==
Since the 2006 signing of the peace agreement, the number of disappearances has dramatically decreased. In 2008, the monarchy was abolished and a federal democratic republic was established.

One of the conditions agreed between the government and the Maoists was to create a new commission to inquire about the enforced disappearances. The Commission on Investigation into Disappeared Persons, Truth and Reconciliation Act 2014 (CoID-TR Act) established two separate commissions:

- The Truth and Reconciliation Commission (TRC The Truth and Reconciliation Commission (TRC) was set up on 10 February 2015. "to investigate on the cases of human rights violations and crimes against humanity". Ganesh Dutta Bhatta was appointed chairperson.
- The Act also set up a Commission of Inquiry on the Disappearances (CoID).

One of the main debate around the new commissions was the recommendation of amnesties for crimes under international law within the Act itself. Many victims' groups were against this part of the Act. That is why five experts for the UN Human Rights Council examined the TRC Act passed by Nepal's Constituent Assembly. According to Richard Bennett, Asia director at Amnesty International, "the UN's findings are consistent with what human rights groups have been saying all along – Nepal’s TRC Act is fundamentally flawed and could leave thousands of victims of conflict-related violations without access to the justice they deserve." Under international pressure, the Supreme Court annulled the amnesty provision, saying it was against constitutional provisions and international laws.

The humanitarian crisis due to the 2015 earthquakes created new problems for the people and slowed progress towards achieving justice.

As of October 2021 the TRC continues to do its work.

== Challenge of justice ==
None of the post-1990 governments have tried to bring the violators of human rights to justice, despite the several commissions in Nepal formed to investigate major human rights violations and political violence.

Also in 1990, the government created a separate commission to investigate the loss of life and damage to property during the popular movement in 1990. The Malik Commission submitted its recommendations to the government in 1990 and held various police personnel, local administrators and members of the Council of Ministers for the human-rights violations committed: 45 people had been killed and 23,000 injured. The report was never made public and none of the alleged perpetrators of human rights have been tried for their actions or punished.

A fear of criminal accountability persists and the new commission is to focus on the victims of violations committed by state agents rather than avoiding criminal prosecution in emphasizing that they were only victims of conflict.

Since the early 1990s, after the transition to democracy, human rights groups have made attempts to combat impunity in Nepal. Instead of being punished, human rights violators have been taken to respectable positions within society. Impunity and the lack of fear of punishment increase the possibility of further violations.

The Nepalese society is still ruled by class and caste orders, and influenced by the feudal and monarchic state which existed until the 1990s. Power relationships in justice administration still remain in democratic Nepal: there is an independent judiciary but most of the judges are appointed by bureaucrats in the judicial service itself.
