= United Nations Security Council Resolution 1879 =

UN Security Council Resolution 1879
- Date: 23 July 2009
- Meeting no.: 6,167
- Code: S/RES/1879 (Document)
- Subject: United Nations Mission in Nepal
- Voting summary: 15 voted for; None voted against; None abstained
- Result: Adopted

Security Council composition
- Permanent members: China; France; Russia; United Kingdom; United States
- Non-permanent members: Austria; Burkina Faso; Costa Rica; Croatia; Japan; Libya; Mexico; Turkey; Uganda; Vietnam

United Nations Security Council Resolution 1879 was unanimously adopted on 23 July 2009.

== Resolution ==
The Security Council today extended through January 2010 the mandate of the United Nations Mission in Nepal (UNMIN), noting Secretary-General Ban Ki-moon's assessment that the operation would be well placed to assist in the management of arms and armed personnel in line with the 25 June 2008 Agreement between political parties in the South Asian country.

Unanimously adopting resolution 1879 (2009), in line with a request from the Government of Nepal and with the Secretary-General's recommendations, the Council renewed the mandate through 23 January. Welcoming the progress achieved so far, the Council called on all political parties in Nepal to expedite the peace process and to work together in a spirit of “cooperation, consensus and compromise to continue the transition to a durable long-term solution to enable the country to move to a peaceful, democratic and more prosperous future”.

The Council requested the Secretary-General to report, by 30 October 2009, on implementation of the present resolution and progress in creating conditions conducive to the completion of UNMIN's activities by the end of the current mandate, including implementation of commitments made in the Nepalese Government's letter of 7 July 2009 (document S/2009/360).

Further, the Council called on the Government to continue to take the necessary decisions to create conditions conducive to completion of UNMIN's activities by the end of the current mandate, including through implementation of the 25 June 2008 Agreement, in order to facilitate the Mission's withdrawal.

Concerned by recent developments in the country, the Council encouraged “renewed and sustained efforts to create a unified approach” among Nepal's political parties, including through the proposed high-level consultative mechanism as a forum for discussion on critical peace process issues. It also called on the Government and all political parties to work together to ensure the early reconstitution and effective working of the Special Committee for the supervision, integration and rehabilitation of Maoist army personnel, drawing upon the support of the Technical Committee established on 27 March 2009 to develop guidelines for bringing those personnel under the Special Committee's supervision.

== See also ==
- List of United Nations Security Council Resolutions 1801 to 1900 (2008–2009)
