= Franco-Italian Agreement of 1935 =

1935 treaty between France and Italy

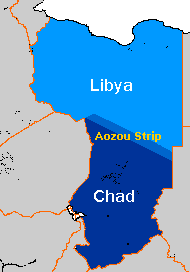
Map showing the Aozou strip, the main territorial agreement in the Mussolini-Laval Accord

The Franco-Italian Agreements (often called Mussolini-Laval Accord) were signed in Rome by both French Foreign Minister Pierre Laval and Italian Prime Minister Benito Mussolini on 7 January 1935.

== History ==
After its victory in World War I, it was agreed that Italy would not receive territories from the defeated German colonial empire. These territories were to be divided between France, Japan and the British Empire, but Italy would be rewarded with some bordering areas from the British and French colonial possessions. That was considered by Italians to be very little compensation for their sacrifices in the bloody war, which was one of the reasons of the rise to power in Italy of Mussolini's fascist regime.

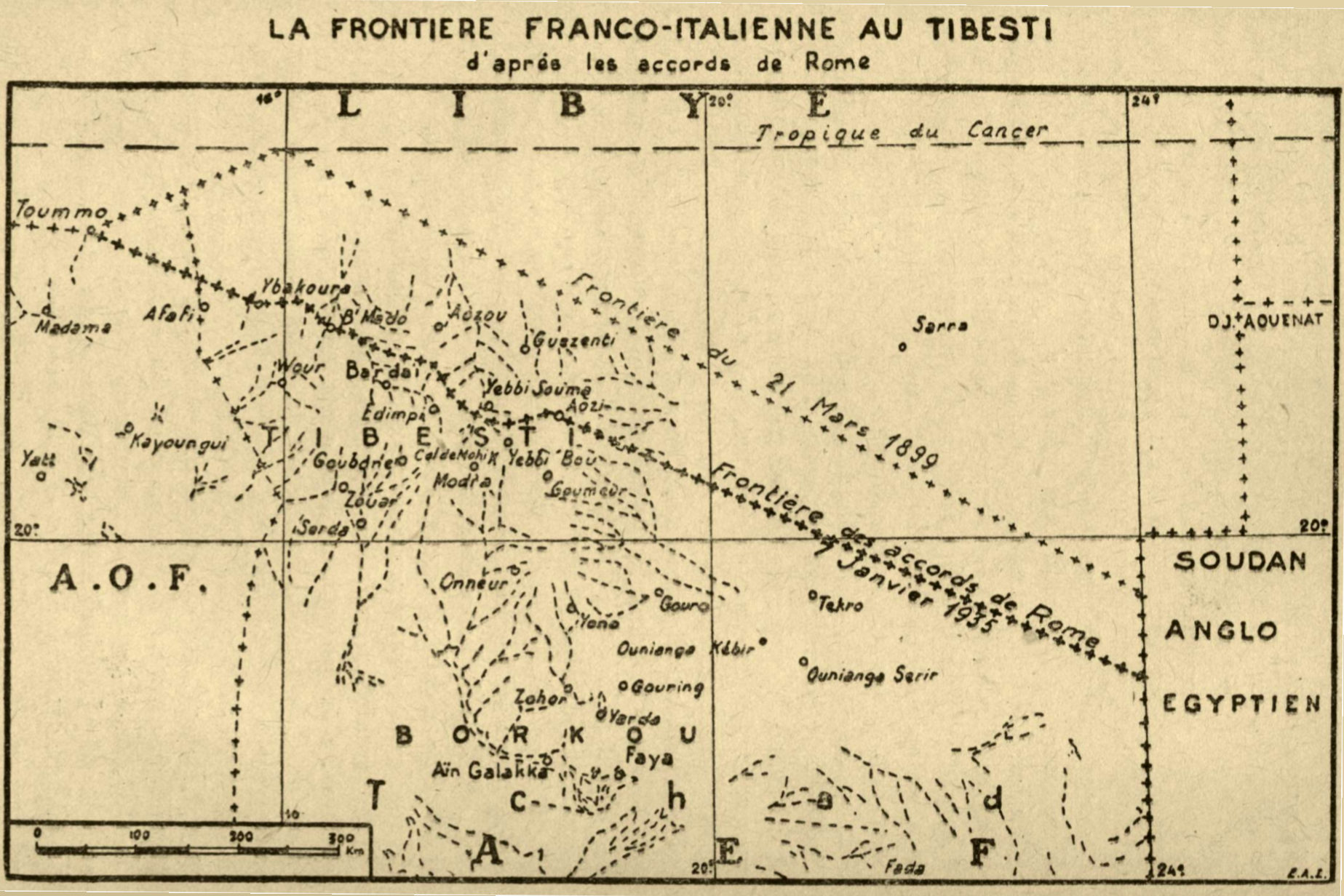
Detailed 1935 map showing the Aouzou Strip and the new Libya-Chad border

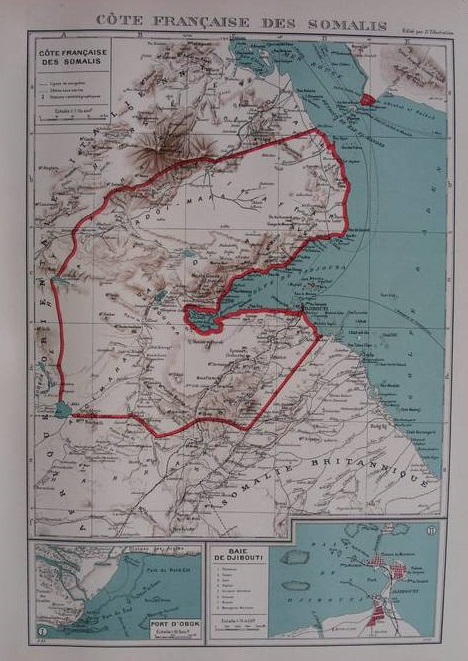
1938 map of French Somaliland. Following the Rome Accords of 1935, the northern border of French Somaliland was moved south of the Straits of Bab-el-Mandeb

The British ceded Oltregiuba (today Jubaland) from Kenya to Italian Somalia in 1924, but the French delayed their contribution some years until 1935, under Laval's leadership, and gave only a small amount of territory in eastern Africa and a desert area in the French Sahara.

Laval had succeeded Louis Barthou as Foreign Minister after the latter's assassination in Marseille on 9 October 1934, along with King Alexander I of Yugoslavia. Laval borrowed the idea of his predecessor of a system of collective security to contain the threat of Hitler in Europe. On 4 January 1935 Laval went to Rome, the capital of Italy, to meet Mussolini. It was the beginning of a diplomatic offensive intended to contain Nazi Germany by a network of alliances.

He proposed a treaty to Mussolini to define disputed parts of French Somaliland (now Djibouti) as part of Italian Eritrea, redefine the official status of Italians in French Tunisia and give Italy a mainly-free hand to occupy Abyssinia during the Abyssinia Crisis.

Italy was also to receive the Aouzou Strip, which was to be moved from French Chad to Italian Libya (that issue would have some implications in World War II and in the later Toyota War between Libya and Chad).

In exchange for those concessions, France hoped for Italian support against German aggression, which did not occur.

The agreements were confirmed by a law of the French Parliament on 26 March 1935. The French and the Italian Parliaments ratified the 1935 agreement. Since the instruments of ratification were not exchanged, the International Court of Justice later named the agreement as "Non-ratified".

The agreement had the following main terms:

- A small territory in French Somaliland south of Eritrean Rahayta was to be given to Italian Eritrea.
- The village of Aozou and the surrounding Aozou Strip in French Chad was to be given to Italian Libya.
- Italy was given a free hand by the French government to occupy Abyssinia.

== Sources ==
- G. Bruce Strang: Imperial Dreams: The Mussolini-Laval Accords of January 1935. In: The Historical Journal 44, September 2001, 3, ISSN 0018-246X, pp. 799–809.
- R. Festorazzi Laval Mussolini. L'impossibile Asse, Milano: Mursia, ISBN 9788842530817
- Langer, William L. ed., An Encyclopaedia of World History, (1948), Houghton Mifflin Company, Boston. Pg. 990.

== See also ==
- Stresa Front
