= Karin Landgren =

Swedish diplomat

Karin Landgren (born 1957) is the executive director of the independent think tank Security Council Report. A former United Nations Under-Secretary-General, she has headed multiple UN peace operations. She has also worked extensively in humanitarian response, development, and protection with the UN refugee agency, UNHCR, and the UN Children's Fund, UNICEF.

== Early life ==
Landgren grew up in Japan and Denmark. She graduated from the London School of Economics with a Bachelor of Science (Economics) in international relations (1978) and a Master of Laws in international law (1979).

== United Nations ==
Landgren joined UNHCR in 1980. In early 1983 she moved to India, working on the protection of Afghan and Iranian asylum-seekers. Subsequently, she worked with Vietnamese asylum-seekers in the Philippines and in Singapore, where she was the UNHCR Representative (1988–90). After serving as chief of staff to the Deputy High Commissioner for Refugees (1990–92), she led UNHCR offices in Eritrea in the aftermath of the Eritrean War of Independence and Bosnia-Herzegovina during the Bosnian War.

As UNHCR's Chief of Standards and Legal Advice in Geneva, Switzerland (1994–98), she contributed in particular to UNHCR’s work and international standards in the realms of statelessness, gender-based persecution, and refugee repatriation. Drawing on her experience in Former Yugoslavia, she published an article on the use of safe zones during conflict.

She joined UNICEF in 1998 as the organisation’s first Chief of Child Protection, and in 2004–05 developed a new and systemic approach to child protection (the “protective environment”), which became UNICEF policy and has subsequently been adopted by other organisations. In 2007-8 she taught a graduate course in child protection at SIPA, Columbia University. She served on the editorial board of the UN Study on Violence Against Children.

In 2008, Landgren became Deputy Special Representative of the Secretary-General to Nepal, under Special Representative Ian Martin, replacing Martin as the head of the UN Mission in Nepal (UNMIN) in February 2009. In this capacity she oversaw the negotiated release of former child soldiers. She closed UNMIN in January 2011.

From 2011 to 2012, she was head of the United Nations Mission in Burundi.

From 2012 to 2015, she was the Special Representative of the Secretary-General to Liberia and head of the United Nations Mission in Liberia (UNMIL). Upon this appointment, Landgren became the first woman to have headed three UN peace operations. She led UNMIL's response to the 2014 Ebola outbreak in Liberia. In these roles, she briefed the UN Security Council regularly.

== Women, peace, and security ==
In 2015 Landgren became a founding member of the Nordic Women's Mediation Network. In an article published in December 2015, Landgren drew attention to the scant numbers of women appointed to senior UN positions that year, notwithstanding the Secretary-General’s stated commitment to gender parity at the United Nations. The following year, all candidates for the post of Secretary-General publicly pledged themselves to a policy of gender parity.

== Visiting scholar ==
Landgren was a visiting scholar at CEU Budapest in 2016, teaching a graduate course in international public policy, and joined the Center on International Cooperation of New York University as a Non-Resident Scholar.

== Security Council Report ==
Landgren joined the Security Council Report as its Executive Director in May 2018. In this capacity she also acts as the organisation’s editor-in-chief. She briefed the Security Council annually in 2019–2021 on the subject of the Council’s working methods.

Security Council Report, founded in 2005 and based in New York City, is an independent and impartial think tank analysing and reporting on developments in the UN Security Council. The SCR also provides training for non-permanent members of the UN security council.

== Personal life ==
Landgren was married to John Mills, a foreign correspondent and bureau chief of the Australian Broadcasting Corporation and subsequently a UN spokesperson, until his death in 2001.
