= United Nations Security Council Resolution 1825 =

UN Security Council Resolution 1825
- Date: 23 July 2008
- Meeting no.: 5,941
- Code: S/RES/1825 (Document)
- Subject: Letter dated 22 November 2006 from the Secretary-General addressed to the President of the Security Council
- Voting summary: 15 voted for; None voted against; None abstained
- Result: Adopted

Security Council composition
- Permanent members: China; France; Russia; United Kingdom; United States
- Non-permanent members: Burkina Faso; Belgium; Costa Rica; Croatia; Indonesia; Italy; Libya; Panama; South Africa; Vietnam

United Nations Security Council Resolution 1825 was unanimously adopted on 23 July 2008.

== Resolution ==
With the United Nations Mission in Nepal (UNMIN) having already accomplished some elements of its mandate following successful Constituent Assembly elections, the Security Council decided this morning to extend the operation for six months to complete its monitoring and management of arms and armed personnel, in line with the 25 June agreement among the country’s political parties.

Acting on a request from the Government of Nepal and the Secretary-General’s recommendations, which had been discussed in an open meeting last Friday (see Press Release SC\9401), the Council unanimously adopted resolution 1825 (2008), by which it called upon all parties to take full advantage of the expertise and readiness of the special political mission in Nepal to support the peace process and facilitate the completion of outstanding aspects of its mandate.

The Council concurred with the Secretary-General that the current monitoring arrangements should not be necessary for a substantial further period and endorsed his recommendations for a phased, gradual drawdown and withdrawal of the Mission.

By further terms of the resolution, the Council called upon the Government of Nepal to continue to create conditions conducive to the completion of UNMIN’s activities, and on all parties to work together in a spirit of consensus and compromise in order to continue the transition to a peaceful, democratic and prosperous future.

== See also ==
- List of United Nations Security Council Resolutions 1801 to 1900 (2008–2009)
