= United Nations Security Council Resolution 1796 =

UN Security Council Resolution 1796
- UN flag
- Date: 23 January 2008
- Meeting no.: 5,825
- Code: S/RES/1796 (Document)
- Subject: The situation in Nepal
- Voting summary: 15 voted for; None voted against; None abstained
- Result: Adopted

Security Council composition
- Permanent members: China; France; Russia; United Kingdom; United States
- Non-permanent members: Burkina Faso; Belgium; Costa Rica; Croatia; Indonesia; Italy; Libya; Panama; South Africa; Vietnam

United Nations Security Council Resolution 1796 was unanimously adopted on 23 January 2008.

== Resolution ==
The Security Council decided this morning to renew the mandate of the United Nations Mission in Nepal (UNMIN) for six months, until 23 July, following a request from that country’s Government and on the basis of the Secretary-General’s recommendation for a six-month extension.

Unanimously adopting resolution 1796 (2008), submitted by the United Kingdom, the Council expressed its full support for the Comprehensive Peace Agreement of 21 November 2006, signed by the Government and the Communist Party of Nepal (Maoist). It called on all parties to maintain momentum in implementation of the Agreement, and to work together for progress towards Constituent Assembly elections, scheduled for 10 April.

Following the adoption, the representative of Nepal expressed his confidence that in the next six months his country would be able to achieve progress in the peace process, including the holding of the 10 April Constituent Assembly elections. Nepal assured the Council that it would cooperate fully with the Special Representative of the Secretary-General in implementing the mandate just renewed.

Contained in a letter from the Permanent Representative of Nepal and addressed to the Secretary-General, the Government’s request was conveyed to the Council in a letter from the Secretary-General dated 27 December 2007. The request followed consultations within Nepal’s Seven-Party Alliance and reflected a consensus among all the parties, including the Communist Party of Nepal (Maoist), which was currently outside the Interim Government.

== See also ==
- List of United Nations Security Council Resolutions 1701 to 1800 (2006–2008)
