= United Nations Security Council Resolution 1740 =

UN Security Council Resolution 1740
- Date: 23 January 2007
- Meeting no.: 5,622
- Code: S/RES/1740 (Document)
- Subject: The situation in Nepal
- Voting summary: 15 voted for; None voted against; None abstained
- Result: Adopted

Security Council composition
- Permanent members: China; France; Russia; United Kingdom; United States
- Non-permanent members: Belgium; Rep. of the Congo; Ghana; Indonesia; Italy; Panama; Peru; Qatar; Slovakia; South Africa

United Nations Security Council Resolution 1740 was unanimously adopted on 23 January 2007, related to situation in Nepal, at the end of the Nepalese Civil War.

== Resolution ==
Recognizing the strong desire of the people of Nepal for peace and the restoration of democracy and noting the request of the Nepalese Government and the Communist Party of Nepal (Maoist) for United Nations assistance in implementing the 2006 Comprehensive Peace Agreement, the Security Council established a United Nations Political Mission in Nepal (UNMIN) for one year, with a mandate to monitor the ceasefire and assist in the election of a Constituent Assembly.

Through the unanimous adoption of resolution 1740, the Council also tasked the new Mission with monitoring the management of arms and armed personnel of both sides through a Joint Monitoring Coordinating Committee.

The new Political Mission would provide technical support for the planning, preparation and conduct of the election and provide a small team of electoral monitors to review all technical aspects of the electoral process and report on the conduct of the election.

The Council also expressed its intention to terminate or further extend UNMIN’s mandate upon the request of the Nepalese Government, taking into consideration the Secretary-General’s expectation that the Mission would be a focused mission of limited duration.

== See also ==
- List of United Nations Security Council Resolutions 1701 to 1800
