= Comprehensive Peace Accord =

2006 agreement which ended Maoist insurgency

Comprehensive Peace Accord
- Type: Peace
- Context: Nepalese Civil War
- Signed: 21 November 2006; 19 years ago
- Location: Kathmandu, Nepal
- Original signatories: Girija Prasad Koirala (Prime Minister of Nepal): Pushpa Kamal Dahal
- Parties: Government of Nepal and Communist Party of Nepal (Maoist)
- Language: Nepali

The Comprehensive Peace Accord (Nepali: विस्तृत शान्ति सम्झौता; abbreviated CPA) was signed on 21 November 2006 between the Government of Nepal and the Communist Party of Nepal (Maoist Centre)—at the time known as the Communist Party of Nepal (Maoist).

== Highlights of the peace accord ==
The peace accord marked the formal end of the Nepalese Civil War that began in 1996. It included the following provisions:

- The Maoist People's Liberation Army to be placed in temporary cantonments, where they would be rehabilitated and re-integrated into the society, and the monarchist army to be confined within the barracks. Both armies to be monitored and supervised by the United Nations Mission in Nepal, as per the earlier agreement reached between the government and the Maoists.
- Strict implementation of all previous pacts/agreements reached between the government and Maoists.
- Termination of the military action and the armed mobilization. Both sides to stop attacks or any kind of violent and offensive activities from either side; no new recruitment in armed forces of both sides and no transportation of arms and ammunition and explosives.
- Both sides to assist each other to maintain law, peace, and order
- Both sides to fully commit themselves to uphold all international human rights laws and civil liberties, and the Office of the United Nations High Commissioner for Human Rights to monitor the human rights situation.
- The King to be stripped of political rights and his property to be nationalized under public trusts.
- Scrapping of the Maoists' parallel administration (People's governments, People's Courts) across the country.
- Strong punitive policy to curb corruption and confiscation of property earned illegally through corruption
- Formation of National Peace and Rehabilitation Commission, Truth Commission, and a high-level Commission for State Restructuring.
- Respectful rehabilitation and social integration of the people displaced during the insurgency

== Implementation ==
CPA's implementation has been a topic of intense debate over the years.

=== Demilitarization ===
The Maoist army was confined within temporary cantonments that were verified and monitored by the United Nations Mission in Nepal (UNMIN), with their arms locked in the cantonment and guarded by UNMIN. An equal number of arms of Nepal Army were also guarded by UNMIN. As of 2007, properties confiscated by Maoists had not been fully returned.

There was disagreement between Maoists and other parties on issues of integration of the Maoist army into the Nepal army. Former Prime Minister Madav Kumar Nepal said that the Maoist army would be rehabilitated and integrated into the Nepal Army but key coalition partners of the Nepali Congress and Madhesi Janadhikar Forum were vehemently opposed to the idea. Even former Defence Minister Bidhya Devi Bhandari was strongly against the deal.

After a second round of verification, 4,008 verified minor and late recruits were released from cantonments beginning in January 2010. Among the released 4,008 ex-combatants from seven main camps and other 21 satellite camps located at various parts of the country, 2,973 were verified minors (who were under 18 when the peace deal was signed on November 21, 2006) and 1,035 were late recruits (recruited after November 21, 2006). As of 2010 the United Nations was providing four types of rehabilitation packages for released ex-combatants which include vocational training, sponsoring school education, health education training and supporting small business initiatives. Research was done to identify how the private sector could support the rehabilitation program and help in consolidating peace.

The demobilization process was concluded in 2013, and most former Maoist fighters opted for integration into the Nepalese military or voluntary discharge, with a handful registering for rehabilitation. Progress on the rehabilitation package for Maoist combatants went underway in 2011, and this process also concluded in 2013 with the reintegration of approximately 16,000 ex-combatants.

=== Human Rights and Transitional Justice ===
Nepal has attempted to pass transitional justice legislation multiple times. In 2008, legislation to establish the Truth and Reconciliation Commission was introduced, as well as legislation to establish the Commission of Investigation on Enforced Disappeared Persons (CIEDP), though both bills were later withdrawn by the government.

On 10 February 2015, the Truth and Reconciliation Commission was established, with Ganesh Dutta Bhatta as chairperson.

In 2024, Nepal adopted a transitional justice law, officially titled "A Bill to Amend the Disappeared Persons’ Enquiry, Truth and Reconciliation Commission Act, 2071." The bill has received criticism due to the lack of involvement of civil society or victims and their families in its development.
