= Aouzou Strip =

Strip of land between Chad and Libya

The Aouzou strip shown in red - Transferred from Libya to Chad

The Aouzou Strip (/ˈaʊzuː/; Arabic: قطاع أوزو, romanized: Qiṭāʿ Awzū, French: Bande d'Aozou) is a strip of land in northern Chad that lies along the border with Libya, extending south to a depth of about 100 kilometers into Chad's Borkou, Ennedi Ouest, Ennedi Est, and Tibesti regions for an area of 114,000 km^{2}. It is named after the small town and oasis of Aouzou. The strip was added to Italian Libya in 1935 for some years and played a significant role in the Chadian–Libyan War when it was claimed by Libya.

== History ==
=== Inclusion in Italian Libya ===
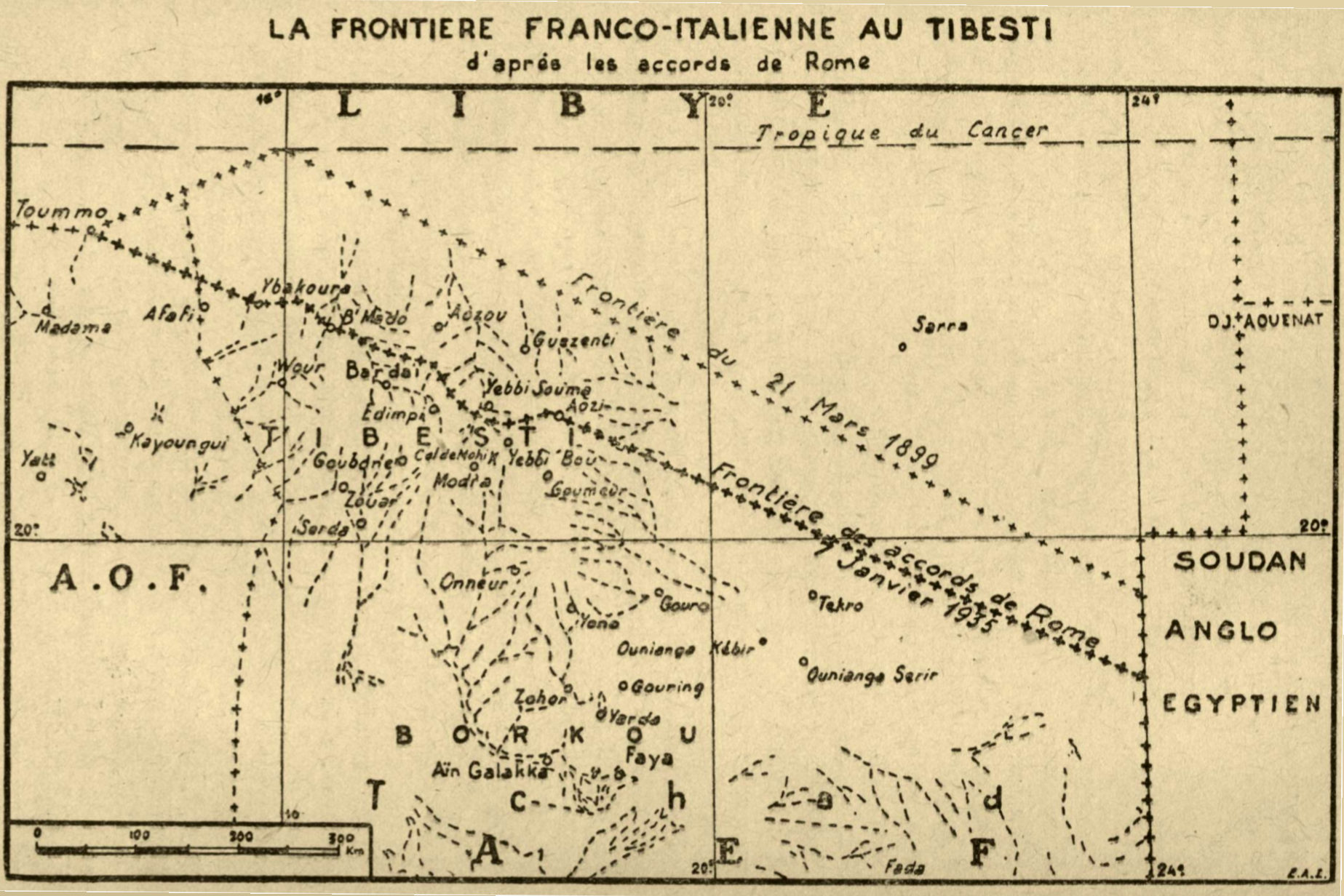
Detailed 1935 map of the Aouzou Strip

The Aouzou strip was defined for the first time in the discussions between France and Italy after World War I, in relation to an award to Italy for the victory in that war. At the Paris Peace Conference (1919–1920), the Kingdom of Italy did not receive any of the German colonies, but instead was given the Oltre Giuba from the United Kingdom, and France agreed to give some Saharan territories to Italian Libya.

After many discussions during the 1920s, the Franco-Italian Agreement of 1935 was signed between Benito Mussolini and Pierre Laval, which included a provision under which Italy would receive the Aouzou strip, which was to be added to Libya. France's other motivations in concluding this agreement with Italy were to settle the status of the Italian Tunisian community in its protectorate of the country, to remove irredentist Italian claims to Nice, and to prevent Italy from growing closer to Nazi Germany by keeping it closely aligned with France and the United Kingdom (the Stresa Front).

This policy failed two years later when Italy drifted into the German orbit by concluding the Pact of Steel with Nazi Germany, leading to the "instruments of ratification" of the Mussolini-Laval Treaty never being exchanged with France. Despite this, the new border was conventionally assumed to be the southern boundary of Libya until 1955.

=== Chadian-Libyan conflict ===
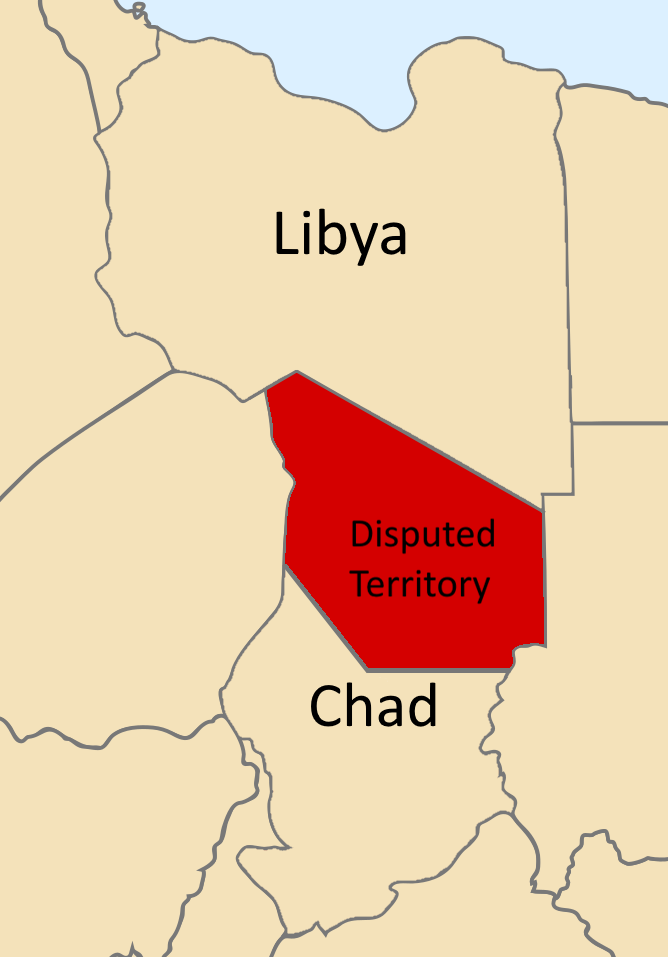
The territorial dispute between Libya and Chad which included the Aouzou Strip. Libya called the disputed area the Borderlands.

Claimed to be rich in uranium deposits, the area became the cause of disputes and eventually war between Chad and Libya.

In April 1972, Libyan leader Muammar Gaddafi came to an agreement with Chadian president François Tombalbaye: Gaddafi would halt his support for FROLINAT rebels and grant a loan or payment to Chad. In exchange for this, Chad would break its ties to Israel and Tombalbaye would quietly accept Libya's claims to the Aouzou Strip. Hence, in 1973, Libya proceeded to occupy and annex the mineral-rich area without any Chadian resistance.

However, after Tombalbaye's downfall, the relations between Libya and Chad deteriorated and Libya again intensified its arming of rebel groups. The French authorities formally recognized the Aouzou Strip as Chadian territory upon the request of president Félix Malloum in August 1977, and Malloum broke diplomatic relations with Libya in February 1978. The Libyan occupation then gave way to the Chadian–Libyan War from 1978 onwards. Libya then claimed an area it called the Borderlands which included the Aouzou Strip.

Libya argued that the territory, as part of the Borderlands, was inhabited by indigenous people who owed vassalage to the Senoussi Order and subsequently to the Ottoman Empire, and that this title had been inherited by Libya. It also supported its claim by referring to the unratified Mussolini-Laval Treaty as the latter confirmed the possession of the strip by Italy.

The frontier claimed by the Chadian government was based on a 1955 treaty between France and Libya, which, in turn, referred back to an 1899 agreement between Great Britain and France about "spheres of influence." Despite other differences, this was one position on which all Chadian political parties and factions were able to agree.

During the so-called Toyota War in 1987, the final stage of the Chadian–Libyan conflict, Chadian forces were able to force the Libyans to temporarily retreat from part of the Strip. A cease-fire between Chad and Libya held from 1987 to 1988, followed by unsuccessful negotiations over the next several years.

In 1990, the territorial dispute was referred for adjudication to the International Court of Justice (ICJ). Finally, a February 1994 ICJ decision found (by a majority of 16 to 1) in favour of Chad's sovereignty over the Borderlands and the Aouzou Strip, and ended the Libyan claim.

The United Nations Security Council established the United Nations Aouzou Strip Observer Group in Resolution 915 (May 1994) to monitor the withdrawal of Libyan troops, and terminated it in Resolution 926 (June 1994), when the withdrawal was completed.

== See also ==
- Mussolini–Laval accord
- Italian Libya
- Chadian–Libyan War
- Libya–Chad Territorial Dispute case
- United Nations Aouzou Strip Observer Group
