= Libya–Chad Territorial Dispute case =

Public international law case

Libyan Arab Jamahiriya v. Chad
- Court: International Court of Justice
- Full case name: Case Concerning the Territorial Dispute (Libyan Arab Jamahiriya/Chad)
- Decided: 3 February 1994

Court membership
- Judges sitting: Jennings, Oda, Ago, Schwebel, Bedjaoui, Ni, Evensen, Tarassov, Guillaume, Shahabuddeen, Aguilar Mawdsley, Weeramantry, Ranjeva, Ajibola, Herczegh ad hoc: Abi-Saab and Sette-Câmara

Case opinions
- The boundary between the Libyan Arab Jamahiriya and Chad is defined by the Treaty of Friendship and Good Neighborliness (1955)
- Concurrence: Ajibola, Ago, Shahabuddeen
- Dissent: Sette-Câmara

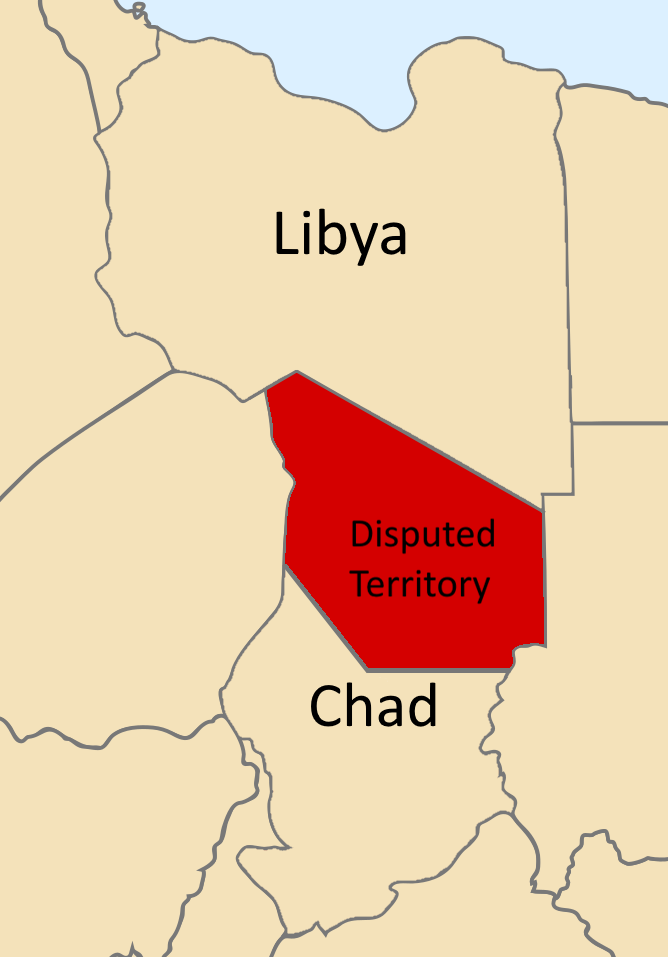
The disputed territory between Chad and Libya. Libya called this area the Libya–Chad Borderlands or simply the Borderlands. It included the Aouzou Strip, a uranium-rich barren strip of land on the border between Libya and Chad

The Case Concerning the Territorial Dispute (Libyan Arab Jamahiriya/Chad) [1994] is a public international law case decided by the International Court of Justice (ICJ) concerning the border between the Libyan Arab Jamahiriya and the Republic of Chad. The case was put forward to settle a territorial dispute between the two countries, particularly over a strip of land called the Aouzou Strip which Libya had occupied since the Chadian–Libyan War, and an area which Libya called the Libya–Chad Borderlands or simply the Borderlands. Libya's claim to the Borderlands included parts of the regions of Borkou, Ennedi and Tibesti, including parts of the localities of Erdi, Kanem and Ounianga. It also covered the Chadian region of B.E.T., excluding northern Kanem.

Libya argued that there was no existing boundary between itself and Chad and asked the court to define one. It also claimed that it had clear rights to territory north of a demarcated line which was on the 15th parallel north for much of its length. Libya called this area the Libya–Chad Borderlands; this was the disputed territory between Chad and Libya. Chad on the other hand argued that there was an existing border and asked the court to define it. It maintained that the Aouzou Strip was part of its territory. Chad's territorial claim was based on the 1955 Treaty of Friendship and Good Neighborliness between France and Libya which would place the Aouzou Strip within the borders of Chad.

The case was referred to the ICJ in 1990 and decided on 3 February 1994. The ICJ ruled in favor of Chad against Libya and declared Libya's occupation of the Aouzou Strip illegal. The court recognised Chad's territorial claim and sovereignty over the Borderlands and Aouzou Strip.

== Facts ==
The Libya–Chad Borderlands were inhabited by several mostly autonomous Saharan-speaking tribes. The allegiances and loyalties of these tribes were pursued by different actors during their conflicts in Chad, destabilising the Chadian state.

Partly in response to the spill-over of this instability on its border, Libya invaded the Aouzou Strip in 1973 before engaging in a series of interventions through the 1980s during the Chadian–Libyan War. The Aouzou Strip is a barren, uranium-rich piece of land located in the Borderlands on the border of Chad and Libya. Libya had begun to stage troops on the strip in order to assist with the defense of its citizens who lived in the area. Despite the land having no strategic or functional value to Chad, the government saw the Aouzou Strip as part of their sovereign territory.

Due to the inability of both countries to internally establish a line of demarcation, the case was referred to the International Court of Justice for adjudication in 1990. Each country had a differing basis from which it derived its claims of the Aouzou Strip:

- Libya's claim is on "the basis of a coalescence of rights and titles of the indigenous inhabitants, the Senoussi Order, the Ottoman Empire, and through an agreement that its government made with Italy."
- Chad has argued that the border was established through the Treaty of Friendship and Good Neighborliness which was concluded between France and Libya in 1955.

From Libya's perspective, there is not enough evidence to show that a boundary was ever established and that they have adequately lay claim to the Aouzou Strip through administrative control. Chad's use of the Treaty of Friendship and Good Neighborliness as basis of its claim has also been challenged due to the treaty being in effect for only 20 years (1955–1975).

== Judgment ==
The case was decided on 3 February 1994. The ICJ ruled that the boundary between Chad and Libya is defined by the Treaty of Friendship and Good Neighborliness which was concluded between France and Libya in 1955. Conversely, this recognised Chad's territorial claims and gave it territorial sovereignty over the Aouzou Strip and the Borderlands. Libya's occupation of the strip was declared illegal. In effect, the ruling also disregarded the rights of the indigenous inhabitants of the Borderlands, whose territorial rights Libya said it inherited to prove its own territorial claim.

== See also ==
- Chadian–Libyan conflict
