= United Nations Mission in Nepal =

- Formation: 23 January 2007
- Type: Monitoring
- Head: Karin Landgren
- Parent organization: United Nations Security Council
- Website: UNMIN website

The United Nations Mission in Nepal or UNMIN was a special political mission in Nepal, established by the UN Security Council in January 2007 through resolution 174040 (2007) to assist in implementing key aspects of the Comprehensive Peace Agreement that ended the internal armed conflict in the South Asian country. The mandate was subsequently extended in resolutions 1796 (2008), 1825 (2008), 1864 (2009), 1879 (2009) and 1909 (2010). UNMIN ceased its operations on January 15, 2011.

Following the Comprehensive Peace Agreement signed on 21 November 2006 between the Government of Nepal and the Communist Party of Nepal (Maoist) at the end of the Nepalese Civil War, the United Nations received a request for assistance, and established the political mission United Nations Mission in Nepal (UNMIN) on 23 January 2007 to monitor the disarmament of Maoist rebels and the preparations for Constituent Assembly elections in 2007.

In 2009 the mandate was renewed, but with a phased withdrawal of UNMIN staff, in line with a report by the Secretary-General. In passing Resolution 1909 (2010), the Security Council hoped to end UNMIN by May 15, 2010.

The Special Representative of the Secretary-General leading the mission prior to the 2009 mandate renewal was Ian Martin. He gave his final briefing to the Security Council in January 2009 and was replaced by Karin Landgren as the Representative of the Secretary-General.

A leaked footage of Prachanda, then supremo of Maoist rebels, was telecasted by Image Channel on May 5, 2009, that clearly shows Prachanda explaining the maoist leadership and cadres how he was able to deceive UNMIN into verifying nearly 20,000 people as maoist fighters by telling them the number was 35,000, when in reality their number was actually less than 8,000.

UNMIN ceased its operations on January 15, 2011. This was followed by a technical and administrative closure of the mission.
