= Communist Party of Nepal (disambiguation) =

The Communist Party of Nepal was founded in Calcutta, India, on 15 September 1949.

Communist Party of Nepal may also refer to:

- Communist Party of Nepal (2006), a short-lived splinter group
- Communist Party of Nepal (2013), a minor political party formed in 2013
- Communist Party of Nepal (Amatya), operated from 1962 to 1994
- Communist Party of Nepal (Burma), operated from 1961 to 2001, known until 1983 as Communist Party of Nepal (Rayamajhi)
- Communist Party of Nepal (Democratic), operated from 1979 to 1991
- Communist Party of Nepal (Fourth Convention), operated from 1974 to 1990
- Communist Party of Nepal (Janamukhi), a short-lived splinter group in 1990s
- Communist Party of Nepal (Manmohan), operated from 1979 to 1987
- Communist Party of Nepal (Maoist) (2025), a minor group formed in 2014 as the Communist Party of Nepal
- Communist Party of Nepal (Maoist Centre), national political party in Nepal, known until 2009 as Communist Party of Nepal (Maoist) and until 2016 as Unified Communist Party of Nepal (Maoist)
- Communist Party of Nepal (Marxist) (1986–91)
- Communist Party of Nepal (Marxist) (1991–2005)
- Communist Party of Nepal (Marxist) (2006)
- Communist Party of Nepal (Marxist–Leninist) (1978), operated from 1978 to 1991
- Communist Party of Nepal (Marxist–Leninist) (1998), operated from 1998 to 2002
- Communist Party of Nepal (Marxist–Leninist) (2002)
- Communist Party of Nepal (Marxist–Leninist–Maoist), operated from 1981 to 2005
- Communist Party of Nepal (Marxist–Leninist–Maoist Centre), operated from 2005 to 2007
- Communist Party of Nepal Marxist−Leninist (Samajbadi), operated from 2010 to 2013
- Communist Party of Nepal (Masal) (historical), operated from 1983 to 2001
- Communist Party of Nepal (Masal) (1999), a short-lived splinter group
- Communist Party of Nepal (Masal) (2006), minor political party, Rastriya Janamorcha acts as the party's electoral front
- Communist Party of Nepal (Mashal), operated from 1985 to 1991
- Communist Party of Nepal (Matri Samuha), a short-lived splinter group formed in 1983
- Communist Party of Nepal (Pushpa Lal), operated from 1968 to 1987
- Communist Party of Nepal (Revolutionary Maoist), a minor group formed in 2012, Patriotic People's Republican Front, Nepal acts as the party's electoral front
- Communist Party of Nepal (Unified), operated from 2007 to 2013
- Communist Party of Nepal (Unified Marxist–Leninist), national political party in Nepal, formed in 1991
- Communist Party of Nepal (Unified Socialist), political party in Nepal, formed in 2021
- Communist Party of Nepal (United), operated from 2007 to 2017
- Communist Party of Nepal (United) (1991–2005)
- Communist Party of Nepal (United Marxist), operated from 2005 to 2013
- Communist Party of Nepal (Unity Centre), operated from 1990 to 2001, Samyukta Janamorcha Nepal acted as the party's electoral front
- Communist Party of Nepal (Unity Centre–Masal), operated from 2002 to 2009, Janamorcha Nepal acted as the party's electoral front
- Nepal Communist Party, a short-lived national political party in Nepal
- Nepal Samyabadi Party (Marksbadi–Leninbadi–Maobadi), operated from the 1990s to 2005

== See also ==
- Communist Party of Nepal (Maoist) (disambiguation)
- Communist Party of Nepal (Marxist–Leninist) (disambiguation)
- List of communist parties in Nepal
