= First premiership of Pushpa Kamal Dahal =

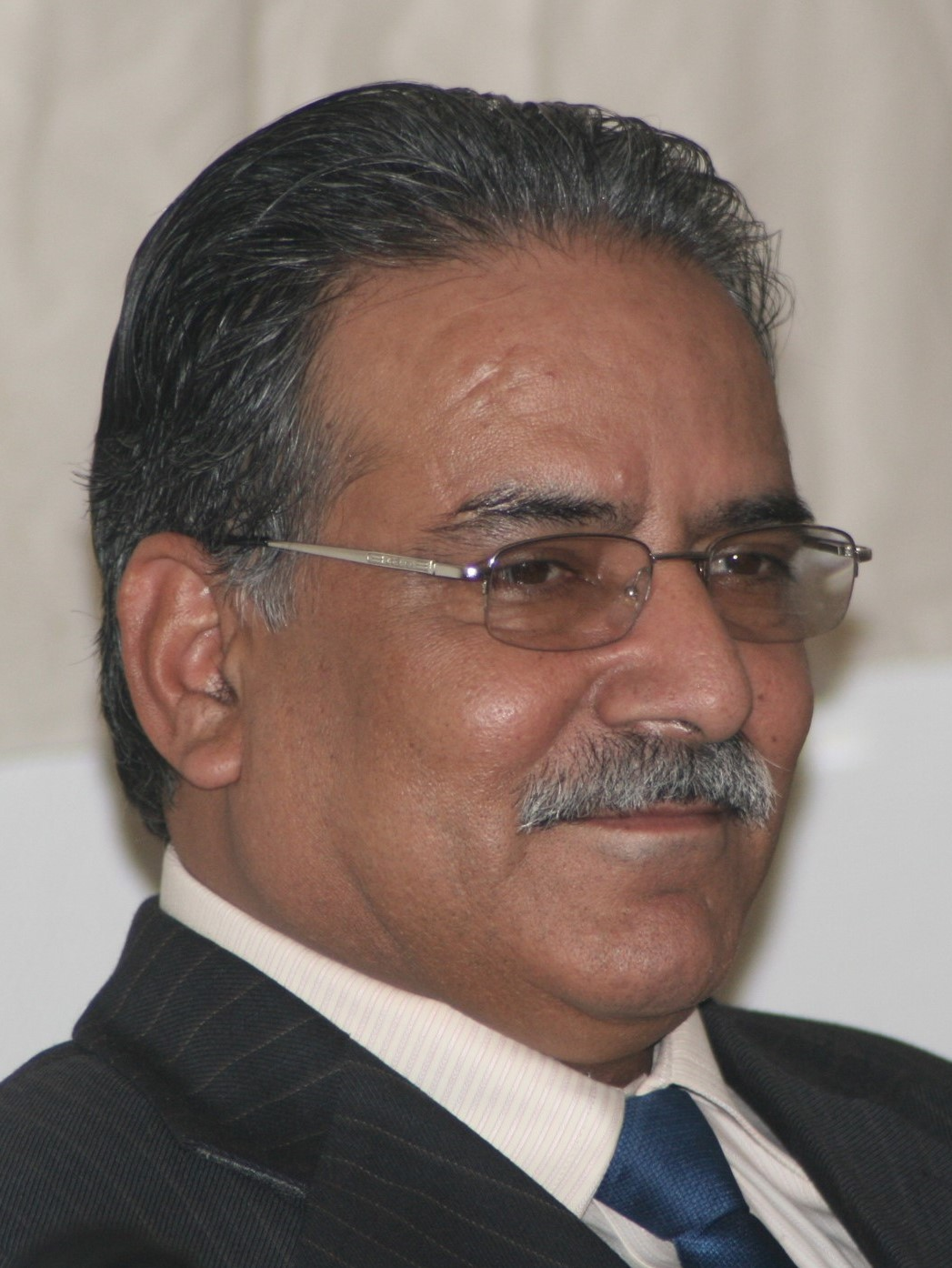
- Dahal in 2009
- First Premiership of Pushpa Kamal Dahal; 18 August 2008 – 25 May 2009
- President: Ram Baran Yadav
- Cabinet: Dahal I
- Party: CPN (Maoist)
- Seat: Singha Durbar
- Coat of Arms of Government of Nepal

Pushpa Kamal Dahal became Prime Minister on 18 August 2008.

== Background ==
Dahal led the CPN (Maoist) into civil war in 1996. In 2006, a peace accord was signed between the maoists and government of Nepal. The maoists joined the Interim Government and a constituent assembly was elected in 2008. Dahal led Maoists became the largest political party and as such made a coalition with CPN (UML) and other parties.

Absolute majority (301/601) required
Constituent Assembly
| Candidate's Name | Party | Votes |
|---|---|---|
| Pushpa Kamal Dahal | CPN (Maoist) | 464 / 601 |
| Sher Bahadur Deuba | Nepali Congress | 113 / 601 |

== Cabinet ==
| S.N. | Portfolio | Minister | Party | Assumed office | Left office |
|---|---|---|---|---|---|
Prime Minister
| 1 | Prime Minister | Pushpa Kamal Dahal | CPN (Maoist) | 18 August 2008 | 25 May 2008 |
Deputy Prime Minister
| 2 | Minister for Home Affairs | Bam Dev Gautam | CPN (UML) | 18 August 2008 | 25 May 2009 |
Cabinet Ministers
| 3 | Minister for Finance | Baburam Bhattarai | CPN (Maoist) | 22 August 2008 | 25 May 2009 |
| 4 | Minister for Foreign Affairs | Upendra Yadav | MJF-N | 22 August 2008 | 25 May 2009 |
| 5 | Minister for Defence | Ram Bahadur Thapa | CPN (Maoist) | 22 August 2008 | 25 May 2009 |
| 6 | Minister for Physical Planning and Works | Bijay Kumar Gachhadar | MJF-N | 22 August 2008 | 25 May 2009 |
| 7 | Minister for Water Resources | Bishnu Prasad Paudel | CPN (UML) | 18 August 2008 | 25 May 2009 |
| 8 | Minister for Information and Communication | Krishna Bahadur Mahara | CPN (Maoist) | 22 August 2008 | 25 May 2009 |
| 9 | Minister for Agriculture and Cooperatives | Jay Prakash Gupta | MJF-N | 22 August 2008 | 25 May 2009 |
| 10 | Minister for Industry | Astalaxmi Shakya | CPN (UML) | 18 August 2008 | 25 May 2009 |
| 11 | Minister for Law, Justice and Constituent Assembly | Dev Gurung | CPN (Maoist) | 22 August 2008 | 25 May 2009 |
| 12 | Minister for Commerce and Supplies | Rajendra Mahato | Sadbhavana | 18 August 2008 | 25 May 2009 |
| 13 | Minister of Land Reform and Management | Matrika Yadav | CPN (Maoist) | 31 August 2008 | 25 March 2009 |
| 13 | Minister of Land Reform and Management | Mahendra Paswan | CPN (Maoist) | 25 March 2009 | 25 May 2009 |
| 14 | Minister for Minister of Youth and Sports | Gopal Shakya | CPN (UML) | 18 August 2008 | 25 May 2009 |
| 15 | Minister for General Administration | Pampha Bhusal | CPN (Maoist) | 31 August 2008 | 25 May 2009 |
| 16 | Minister for Minister for Tourism and Civil Aviation | Hisila Yami | CPN (Maoist) | 31 August 2008 | 25 May 2009 |
| 17 | Minister for Minister for Health and Population | Giriraj Mani Pokharel | Janamorcha | 22 August 2008 | 25 May 2009 |
| 18 | Minister for Education | Renu Kumari Yadav | MJF-N | 22 August 2008 | 25 May 2009 |
| 19 | Minister for Forests and Soil Conservation | Kiran Gurung | CPN (UML) | 31 August 2008 | 25 May 2009 |
| 20 | Minister for Peace and Reconstruction | Janardhan Sharma | CPN (Maoist) | 31 August 2008 | 25 May 2009 |
| 21 | Minister for Culture and State Restructuring | Gopal Kirati | CPN (Maoist) | 31 August 2008 | 25 May 2009 |
| 22 | Minister for Local Development | Ram Chandra Jha | CPN (UML) | 31 August 2008 | 25 May 2009 |
| 23 | Minister for Labour and Transport | Lekh Raj Bhatta | CPN (Maoist) | 31 August 2008 | 25 May 2009 |
| 24 | Minister for Science and Technology | Ganesh Shah | CPN (United) | 31 August 2008 | 25 May 2009 |
| 25 | Minister for Women, Children and Social Welfare | Ramcharan Chaudhari (Tharu) | CPN (Maoist) | 25 March 2009 | 25 May 2009 |

== Security Policy ==
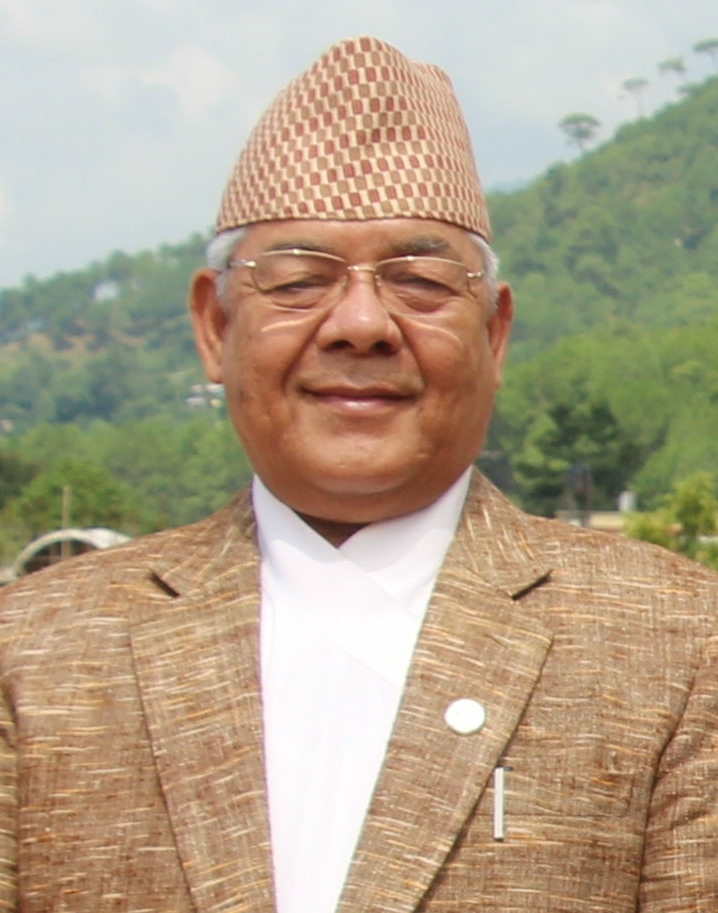
Minister for Home Affairs
Bam Dev Gautam
18 August 2008 – 25 May 2009

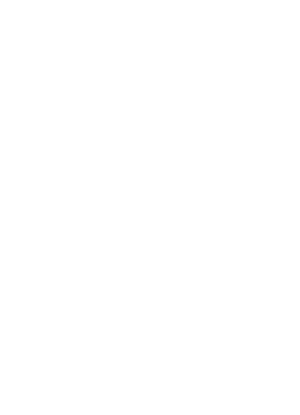
Minister for Defence
Ram Bahadur Thapa
18 August 2008 – 25 May 2009

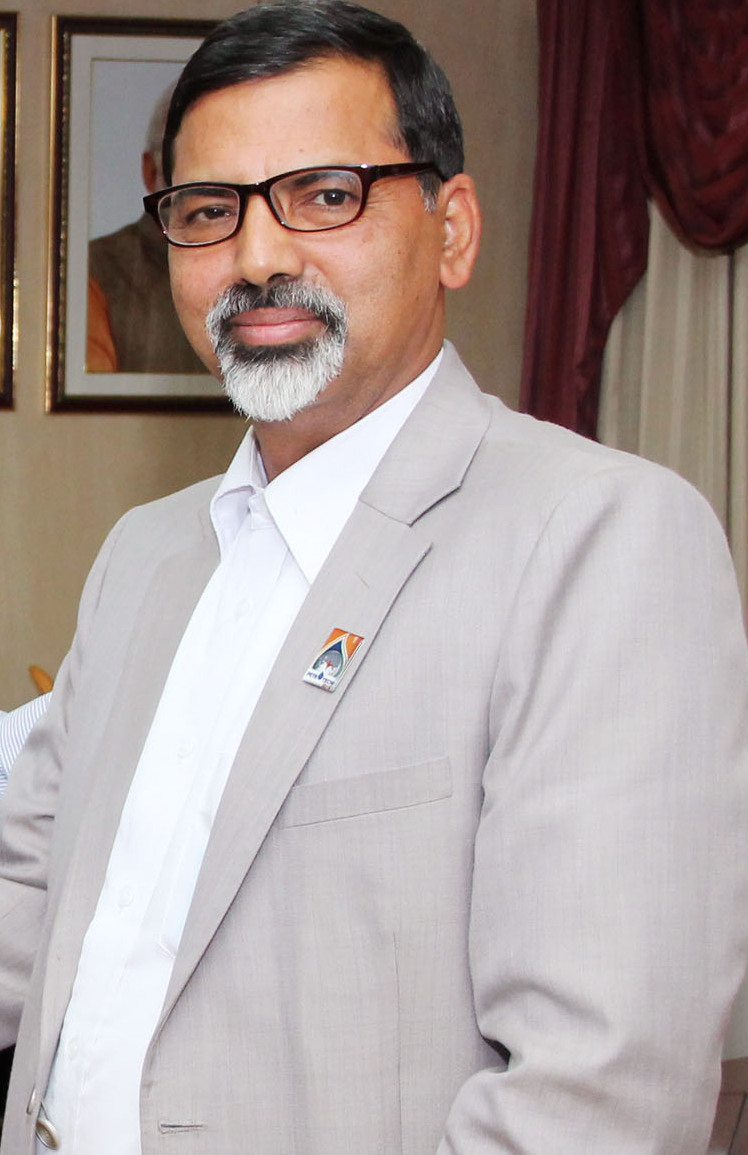
Minister for Peace and Reconstruction
Janardan Sharma
31 August 2008 – 25 May 2009

Integration of Maoist Fighters into Nepal Army couldn't be achieved. This was cited as one of the major reasons for removal of COAS Rookmangud Katwal.

In 2008, at least 81 fatalities occurred in violence attributed to militant groups and clashes in the Terai region, including a bomb blast in Rautahat District. The Young Communist League (YCL), composed largely of former combatants, assumed quasi‑policing roles in some areas and was implicated in abductions, beatings, intimidation of political opponents.

== Foreign Policy and Trips ==
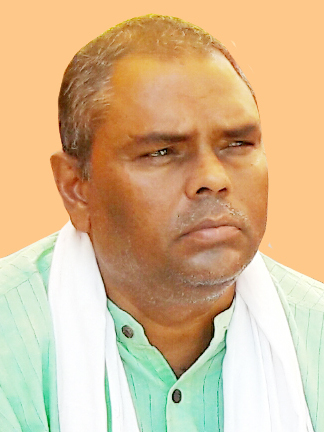
Minister for Foreign Affairs Upendra Yadav 22 August 2008 — 25 May 2009

=== Foreign Trips ===
| | Country | Areas visited | Dates | Details / References |
|---|---|---|---|---|
| 1 | China | Beijing | 23–27 August 2008 | To attend 2008 Summer Olympics closing ceremony. |
| 2 | India | New Delhi, Bangalore | 14–18 September 2008 | Official visit |
| 3 | United States | New York City | 20-30 September 2008 | Visited New York to participate in the United Nations General Assembly. |
| 4 | Norway | Oslo | 29–31 March 2009 | Official visit |
| 5 | Finland | Helsinki | 1–3 April 2009 | Official visit |

Dahal's first visit was to China. He met Chinese leaders including President Hu Jintao and Premier Wen Jiabao. His visit marked a break from tradition of visiting India first.

Dahal went to India on a state visit at the invitation of Indian PM Manmohan Singh in mid September. Dahal held bilateral talks on cooperation.

Dahal visited US to attend UN general assembly and reiterated Nepal’s peace process and international cooperation. He also met US President George W. Bush.

Dahal also visited Norway and Finland at the invitation of the Norwegian and Finnish Prime Minister respectively. They discussed bilateral relations and development cooperation.
