= Prabhu Narayan Chaudhury =

Nepalese communist politician (1942–2010)

Prabhu Narayan Chaudhury (11 August 1942 – 14 September 2010) was a Nepalese communist politician, who served as Minister of Land Reform and Management in the interim government formed in May 2006.

== Biography ==
He was born on 11 August 1942 in Pakali village of Sunsari district. He was the grandson of Babu Lal and the son of Jira Lal Chaudhury. Prabhu Narayan Chaudhury passed his Matric at the Admission Examination Board in Varanasi in 1958. He passed his IA degree from Tribhuvan University in 1961. In the same year he married Jagar Nathani Devi. He was a member of the Students Federation and became a member of the Communist Party of Nepal. He became a member of the Sunsari District Committee of the party in 1961. He worked in different educational institutions in Sunsari District.

Chaudhury was the secretary of the Sunsari District Committee of the Communist Party of Nepal (Pushpa Lal) 1970 to 1976. He obtained a BA degree from Tribhuvan University in 1973, and in 1976 he obtained a BL degree from the same institution. Chaudhury spent 14 years in prisons.

Chaudhury became a Central Committee member of the Communist Party of Nepal (Marxist) in 1987. He was a Central Committee member of the Communist Party of Nepal (Unified Marxist-Leninist) between 15 January 1990 and 22 September 1991. As of early 1992 he was the convenor of Preparatory Committee for the National Conference, Communist Party of Nepal. He was a central member of the Tharu Welfare Committee until 1993, and was a member of the editorial board of the Tharu Sanskriti Parivar and an advisory member of the Nepal Janajati Mahasangh. Chaudhury was elected as the chairman of the Communist Party of Nepal (Marxist) at the Seventh Party National Conference held in January 1993. He served as the treasurer of the Nepal Bar Association. He was re-elected as the Communist Party of Nepal (Marxist) chairman at the Eight National Party Conference on 20 September 1994. Chaudhury stood as the CPN (Marxist) candidate in the 1994 parliamentary election in the 4th constituency of Sunsari District, obtaining 528 votes. In 1998, in the lead-up to the 1999 parliamentary election, the Communist Party of Nepal (Marxist) and the Communist Party of Nepal (United) formed the United Marxist Front, with Chaudhury as its president.

Chaudhury served as the president of the United Left Front. On 19 September 2005 the Communist Party of Nepal (Marxist) and the Communist Party of Nepal (United) merged, forming the Communist Party of Nepal (United Marxist). Chaudhury became the chairman of the new party. In the wake of the Jana Andolan II, on 2 May 2006 Chaudhury was named Ministry for Land Reform and Management in the seven-member interim cabinet of G. P. Koirala. As Land Minister, Chaudhury announced moves to redistribute lands from the former king Gyanendra and other members of the former royal family in 2006. Per Chaudhury, the former king held some 80,000 ropanis of land, far above the legal limit of individual land holdings.

Around October 2006 Chaudhury resigned from his post as party chairman, as the Communist Party of Nepal (United Marxist) went through a period of internal conflict. During the constitution-writing process after the fall of the monarchy, Chaudhury advocated for the creation of Gandaki, Koshi and Karnali states.

Prabhu Narayan Chaudhury died at Norvic Hospital, from a heart attack, on 14 September 2010.
