= First Dahal cabinet =

Government of Nepal from 2008 to 2009

- Cabinet of Nepal
- August 2008–May 2009
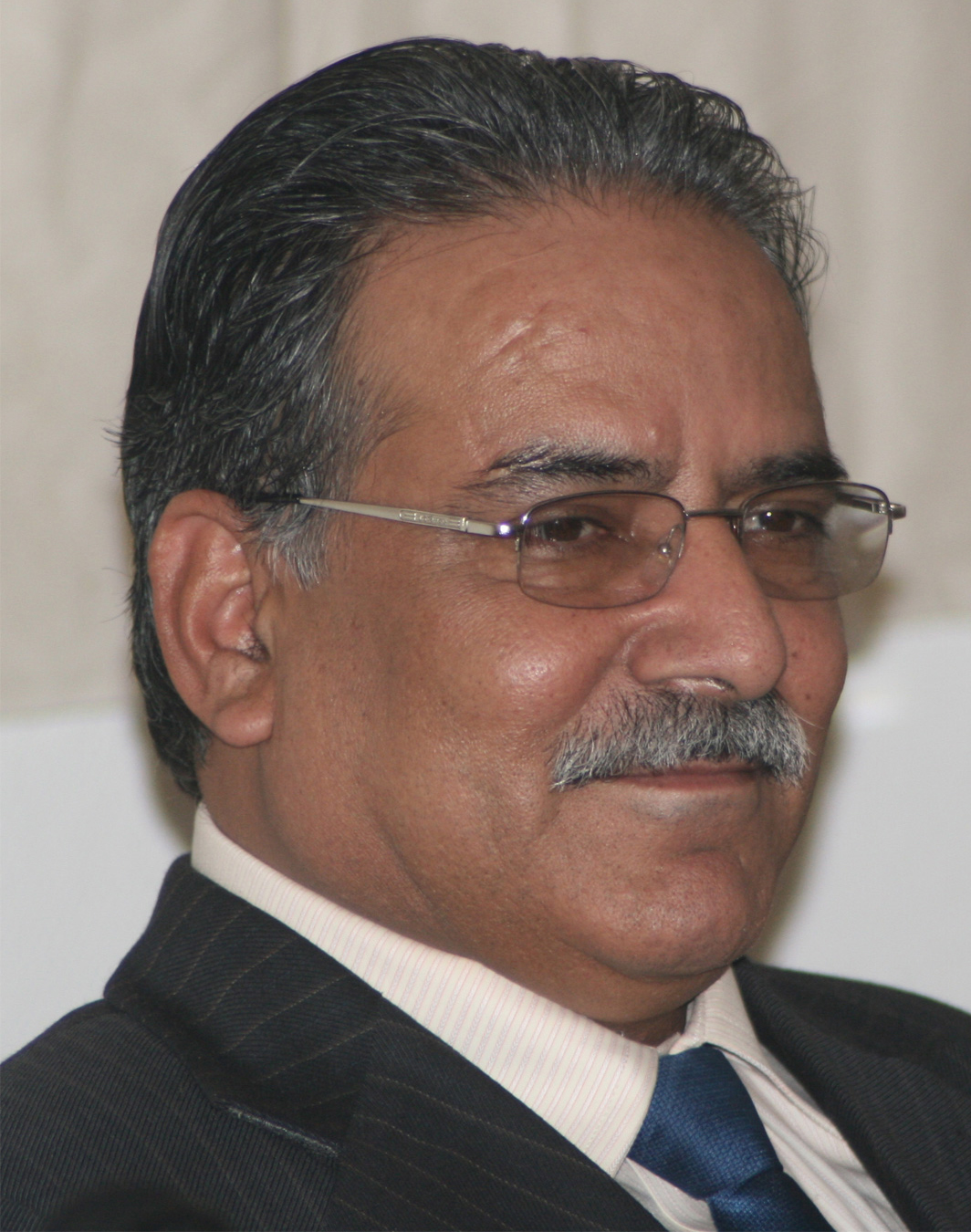
- Date formed: 18 August 2008
- Date dissolved: 25 May 2009

People and organisations
- President: Ram Baran Yadav
- Prime Minister: Pushpa Kamal Dahal
- Deputy Prime Minister: Bam Dev Gautam
- Total no. of members: 26 appointments
- Member party: CPN (Maoist) CPN (UML) MFJ-N Sadbhavana Janamorcha CPN (United)
- Status in legislature: Majority (coalition)
- Opposition party: Nepali Congress
- Opposition leader: Girija Prasad Koirala

History
- Election: 2008
- Legislature term: 2008–2012
- Predecessor: G.P. Koirala interim cabinet
- Successor: Madhav Nepal cabinet

The first Dahal cabinet was formed on 18 August 2008 following the 2008 Constituent Assembly election. CPN (Maoist) leader Pushpa Kamal Dahal was appointed as prime minister and his coalition government was supported by CPN (UML), Madheshi Jana Adhikar Forum, Sadbhavana Party, Janamorcha Nepal and CPN (United). The cabin was expanded with the inclusion of two ministers on 25 March 2009.

After unsuccessfully trying to remove Chief of the Nepalese Army Rookmangud Katawal, Dahal lost support of his biggest coalition partner CPN (UML) and resigned on 4 May 2009. He was replaced by Madhav Kumar Nepal on 25 May 2009.

== Election of the Prime Minister ==
Absolute majority (301/601) required
Constituent Assembly
Candidate's Name	Party	Votes
Pushpa Kamal Dahal	CPN (Maoist)	464 / 601
Sher Bahadur Deuba	Nepali Congress	113 / 601

== Cabinet ==
S.N.	Portfolio	Minister	Party	Assumed office	Left office
Cabinet ministers
1	Prime Minister	Pushpa Kamal Dahal	CPN (Maoist)	18 August 2008	25 May 2008
1	Minister for Women, Children and Social Welfare	Pushpa Kamal Dahal	CPN (Maoist)	18 August 2008	25 March 2009
2	Deputy Prime Minister	Bam Dev Gautam	CPN (UML)	18 August 2008	25 May 2009
2	Minister for Home Affairs	Bam Dev Gautam	CPN (UML)	18 August 2008	25 May 2009
3	Minister for Finance	Baburam Bhattarai	CPN (Maoist)	22 August 2008	25 May 2009
4	Minister for Foreign Affairs	Upendra Yadav	MJF-N	22 August 2008	25 May 2009
5	Minister for Defence	Ram Bahadur Thapa	CPN (Maoist)	22 August 2008	25 May 2009
6	Minister for Physical Planning and Works	Bijay Kumar Gachhadar	MJF-N	22 August 2008	25 May 2009
7	Minister for Water Resources	Bishnu Prasad Paudel	CPN (UML)	18 August 2008	25 May 2009
8	Minister for Information and Communication	Krishna Bahadur Mahara	CPN (Maoist)	22 August 2008	25 May 2009
9	Minister for Agriculture and Cooperatives	Jay Prakash Gupta	MJF-N	22 August 2008	25 May 2009
10	Minister for Industry	Astalaxmi Shakya	CPN (UML)	18 August 2008	25 May 2009
11	Minister for Law, Justice and Constituent Assembly	Dev Gurung	CPN (Maoist)	22 August 2008	25 May 2009
12	Minister for Commerce and Supplies	Rajendra Mahato	Sadbhavana	18 August 2008	25 May 2009
13	Minister of Land Reform and Management	Matrika Yadav	CPN (Maoist)	31 August 2008	25 March 2009
13	Minister of Land Reform and Management	Mahendra Paswan	CPN (Maoist)	25 March 2009	25 May 2009
14	Minister for Minister of Youth and Sports	Gopal Shakya	CPN (UML)	18 August 2008	25 May 2009
15	Minister for General Administration	Pampha Bhusal	CPN (Maoist)	31 August 2008	25 May 2009
16	Minister for Minister for Tourism and Civil Aviation	Hisila Yami	CPN (Maoist)	31 August 2008	25 May 2009
17	Minister for Minister for Health and Population	Giriraj Mani Pokharel	Janamorcha	22 August 2008	25 May 2009
18	Minister for Education	Renu Kumari Yadav	MJF-N	22 August 2008	25 May 2009
19	Minister for Forests and Soil Conservation	Kiran Gurung	CPN (UML)	31 August 2008	25 May 2009
20	Minister for Peace and Reconstruction	Janardhan Sharma	CPN (Maoist)	31 August 2008	25 May 2009
21	Minister for Culture and State Restructuring	Gopal Kirati	CPN (Maoist)	31 August 2008	25 May 2009
22	Minister for Local Development	Ram Chandra Jha	CPN (UML)	31 August 2008	25 May 2009
23	Minister for Labour and Transport	Lekh Raj Bhatta	CPN (Maoist)	31 August 2008	25 May 2009
24	Minister for Science and Technology	Ganesh Shah	CPN (United)	31 August 2008	25 May 2009
25	Minister for Women, Children and Social Welfare	Ramcharan Chaudhari (Tharu)	CPN (Maoist)	25 March 2009	25 May 2009
