= Chitwan 2 =

Parliamentary constituency in Nepal

- Parliamentary constituency
- Chitwan 2 in Bagmati Province
- Province: Bagmati Province
- District: Chitwan District

Current constituency
- Created: 1991
- Party: Rastriya Swatantra Party
- Member of Parliament: Rabi Lamichhane

Chitwan 2 is one of three parliamentary constituencies of Chitwan District in Nepal. This constituency came into existence on the Constituency Delimitation Commission (CDC) report submitted on 31 August 2017.

== Incorporated areas ==
Chitwan 2 parliamentary constituency incorporates Ichchhyakamana Rural Municipality, Kalika Municipality and wards 1–5, 7, 10–12 and 29 of Bharatpur Metropolitan City.

== Assembly segments ==
It encompasses the following Bagmati Provincial Assembly segment

- Chitwan 2(A)
- Chitwan 2(B)

== Members of Parliament ==
=== Parliament/Constituent Assembly ===
Election	Member	Party
1991	Bhim Bahadur Shrestha	CPN (Democratic)
July 1991	Bhim Bahadur Shrestha	CPN (United)
1994	Kashi Nath Adhikari	CPN (Unified Marxist–Leninist)
1999	Eknath Rababhat	Nepali Congress
2008	Ram Bahadur Thapa	CPN (Maoist)
January 2009	Ram Bahadur Thapa	UCPN (Maoist)
2013	Shesh Nath Adhikari	Nepali Congress
2017	Krishna Bhakta Pokharel	CPN (Unified Marxist–Leninist)
May 2018	Krishna Bhakta Pokharel	Nepal Communist Party
2022	Rabi Lamichhane	Rastriya Swatantra Party
2023 by-election	Rabi Lamichhane	Rastriya Swatantra Party
2026	Rabi Lamichhane	Rastriya Swatantra Party

=== Provincial Assembly ===
==== 2(A) ====
Election	Member	Party
2017	Ghan Shyam Dahal	CPN (Maoist Centre)
May 2018	Ghan Shyam Dahal	Nepal Communist Party
2022	Krishna Prasad Silwal	CPN (UML)

==== 2(B) ====
Election	Member	Party
2017	Bijay Subedi	CPN (Unified Marxist–Leninist)
May 2018	Bijay Subedi	Nepal Communist Party
2022	Uttam Joshi	Nepali Congress

== Election results ==
=== Election in the 2020s ===
==== 2026 general election ====
Candidate	Party	Votes	%
Rabi Lamichhane	Rastriya Swatantra Party	54,402	64.59
Mina Kumari Kharel	Nepali Congress	14,564	17.29
Ashmin Ghimire	CPN (UML)	6,992	8.30
Others		8,274	9.82
Total		84,232	100.00
Majority		39,838	
Rastriya Swatantra Party hold			
Source: Election Commission of Nepal

==== 2023 by-election ====
Candidate	Party	Votes	%
Rabi Lamichhane	Rastriya Swatantra Party	54,176	69.94
Jit Narayan Shrestha	Nepali Congress	11,214	14.48
Ram Prasad Neupane	CPN (UML)	10,936	14.12
Others		1,140	1.47
Total		77,466	100.00
Majority		42,962	
Rastriya Swatantra Party hold			
Source: Election Commission of Nepal

==== 2022 general election ====
Candidate	Party	Votes	%
Rabi Lamichhane	Rastriya Swatantra Party	49,300	61.05
Umesh Shrestha	Nepali Congress	14,988	18.56
Krishna Bhakta Pokharel	CPN (UML)	14,652	18.14
Others		1,813	2.25
Total		80,753	100.00
Majority		34,312	
Rastriya Swatantra Party gain			

==== 2022 Nepalese provincial elections ====
===== Chitwan 2(A) =====
Party	Candidate	Votes
CPN (Unified Marxist-Leninist)	Krishna Prasad Silwal	16,500
CPN (Maoist Centre)	Ghan Shyam Dahal	15,260
Others		5193
Invalid votes		
Result	CPN (UML) gain	
Source: Election Commission

===== Chitwan 2(B) =====
Party	Candidate	Votes
Nepali Congress	Uttam Joshi	13,306
Communist Party of Nepal (Unified Marxist-Leninist)	Devi Prasad Gyawali	12,744
Rastriya Prajatantra Party	Jagdishwor Adhikari	7,608
Hamro Nepali Party	Hari Ram Rimal	827
Others		1,494
Invalid votes		
Result	NC gain	
Source: Election Commission

=== Election in the 2010s ===
==== 2017 legislative elections ====
Party	Candidate	Votes
CPN (Unified Marxist–Leninist)	Krishna Bhakta Pokharel	44,670
Nepali Congress	Shesh Nath Adhikari	27,314
Bibeksheel Sajha Party	Bhupendra Raj Basnet	1,245
Others		1,464
Invalid votes		1,702
Result	CPN (UML) gain	
Source: Election Commission

==== 2017 Nepalese provincial elections ====
===== Chitwan 2(A) =====
Party	Candidate	Votes
CPN (Maoist Centre)	Ghan Shyam Dahal	20,381
Nepali Congress	Jit narayan shrestha	15,663
Others		1,604
Invalid votes		1,031
Result	Maoist Centre gain	
Source: Election Commission

===== Chitwan 2(B) =====
Party	Candidate	Votes
CPN (Unified Marxist–Leninist)	Bijay Subedi	21,572
Nepali Congress	Prakash Adhikari	12,670
Bibeksheel Sajha Party	Ram Chandra Timilsina	1,284
CPN (Marxist–Leninist)	Saraswati Sharma Paudel	1,284
Others		966
Invalid votes		936
Result	CPN (UML) gain	
Source: Election Commission

==== 2013 Constituent Assembly election ====
Party	Candidate	Votes
Nepali Congress	Shesh Nath Adhikari	17,810
CPN (Unified Marxist–Leninist)	Krishna Prasad Sharma Khanal	16,811
UCPN (Maoist)	Bishwa Bhakta Dulal	9,320
Others		2,899
Result	Congress gain	
Source: NepalNews

=== Election in the 2000s ===
==== 2008 Constituent Assembly election ====
Party	Candidate	Votes
CPN (Maoist)	Ram Bahadur Thapa	21,409
Nepali Congress	Eknath Rababhat	13,009
CPN (Unified Marxist–Leninist)	Kashi Nath Adhikari	11,312
CPN (Marxist–Leninist)	Bhagwati Ghimire	2,179
Others		1,775
Invalid votes		2,272
Result	Maoist gain	
Source: Election Commission

=== Election in the 1990s ===
==== 1999 legislative elections ====
Party	Candidate	Votes
Nepali Congress	Eknath Rababhat	21,727
CPN (Unified Marxist–Leninist)	Sita Kumari Paudel	19,502
CPN (Marxist–Leninist)	Dambar Shrestha	3,774
Rastriya Prajatantra Party	Krishna Bahadur Lama	1,313
Others		1,325
Invalid Votes		1,043
Result	Congress gain	
Source: Election Commission

==== 1994 legislative elections ====
Party	Candidate	Votes
CPN (Unified Marxist–Leninist)	Kashi Nath Adhikari	17,592
Nepali Congress	Tek Prasad Gurung	12,389
Rastriya Prajatantra Party	Nanda Prasad Bhattarai	4,046
Others		842
Result	CPN (UML) gain	
Source: Election Commission

==== 1991 legislative elections ====
Party	Candidate	Votes
CPN (Democratic)	Bhim Bahadur Shrestha	25,716
Nepali Congress	Ganga Dhar Lamsal	24,140
Result	CPN (D) gain	

== See also ==
- List of parliamentary constituencies of Nepal
