= Communist Party of Nepal (Marxist–Leninist) =

Communist Party of Nepal (Marxist–Leninist) may refer to:

- Communist Party of Nepal (Marxist–Leninist) (1978)
- Communist Party of Nepal (Marxist–Leninist) (1998)
- Communist Party of Nepal (Marxist–Leninist) (2002)

== See also ==
- Nepal Samyabadi Party (Marksbadi–Leninbadi–Maobadi) (English: Communist Party of Nepal (Marxist-Leninist-Maoist)) (2005–2007)
- Communist Party of Nepal (Marxist–Leninist–Maoist) (1981–2009)
- Communist Party of Nepal (Marxist–Leninist–Maoist Centre) (2005–2007)
- Communist Party of Nepal Marxist−Leninist (Samajbadi) (2010–2013)
- Communist Party of Nepal (disambiguation)
