= Hemanta Bahadur B.C. =

Nepalese politician

Hemanta Bahadur B.C. is a Nepalese politician and the chairman of the Communist Party of Nepal (United Marxist). He was a leading member of the Communist Party of Nepal (United), prior to the merger of that party into the Communist Party of Nepal (United Marxist). When the United Left Front was constituted in 2002, he became its treasurer.
