= Nepal Progressive Student Federation =

Nepal Progressive Student Federation is a students organisation in Nepal. It is the students wing of the Communist Party of Nepal (United Marxist).

NPSF was formed on December 10, 2005, through the merger of the Nepal National Students Federation (students wing of Communist Party of Nepal (United)) and Nepal Progressive Students Union (students wing of Communist Party of Nepal (Marxist)). The decision to go ahead with the merger was taken at a joint meeting of the central committees of the two federations on November 12.

NPSF actively takes part in protests against the royal regime in Nepal.
