= Nepal Progressive Trade Union Federation =

Nepalese trade union

NPTUF
- Nepal Progressive Trade Union Federation
- Type: Trade union
- Location: Nepal
- Key people: Sunil Manandhar, president
- Affiliations: WFTU

Nepal Progressive Trade Union Federation is a central trade union federation in Nepal. It is the labour wing of the Communist Party of Nepal (United Marxist). NPTUF was formed on November 19, 2005, through the unification of the Nepal Trade Union Federation (trade union of Communist Party of Nepal (United)) and Nepal Trade Union Centre (trade union of Communist Party of Nepal (Marxist)). NPTUF is a constituent of the United Trade Union Movement Coordination Committee.

Sunil Manandhar is the president of NPTUF.
