= Fifth Girija Prasad Koirala cabinet =

Government of Nepal from 2006 to 2007

- Cabinet of Nepal
- April 2006–April 2007
- Date formed: 29 April 2006
- Date dissolved: 1 April 2007

People and organisations
- Monarch: King Gyanendra
- Prime Minister: Girija Prasad Koirala
- Total no. of members: 21 appointments
- Member party: Nepali Congress CPN (UML) Nepali Congress (Democratic) Janamorcha Nepal United Left Front Sadbhavana (Anandidevi)

History
- Predecessor: King Gyanendra cabinet
- Successor: G.P. Koirala interim cabinet

The fifth Girija Prasad Koirala cabinet was formed on 29 April 2006 after Girija Prasad Koirala was appointed prime minister following the 2006 revolution. The cabinet was expanded on 22 May 2006 and again on 11 June 2006. The cabinet signed the Comprehensive Peace Accord with the CPN (Maoist).

The cabinet was dissolved on 1 April 2007 to make way for a consensus government which included the Maoists.

== Cabinet ==
Portfolio	Minister	Party	Took office	Left office
Prime Minister of Nepal; Minister for Palace Affairs; Minister for Defence	Girija Prasad Koirala	Nepali Congress	29 April 2006	1 April 2007
Deputy Prime Minister; Minister for Foreign Affairs	K. P. Sharma Oli	CPN (UML)	29 April 2006	1 April 2007
Deputy Prime Minister; Minister for Health	Amik Sherchan	Janamorcha	11 June 2006	1 April 2007
Minister for Physical Planning and Construction	Gopal Man Shrestha	Congress (Democratic)	29 April 2006	1 April 2007
Minister for Agriculture and Cooperatives	Mahantha Thakur	Nepali Congress	29 April 2006	1 April 2007
Minister for Finance	Ram Sharan Mahat	Nepali Congress	29 April 2006	1 April 2007
Minister for Industry, Commerce and Supplies	Ram Sharan Mahat	Nepali Congress	15 March 2007	1 April 2007
Minister for Law, Justice and Parliamentary Affairs	Narendra Bikram Nembang	Congress (Democratic)	22 May 2006	1 April 2007
Minister for Home Affairs	Krishna Prasad Sitaula	Nepali Congress	29 April 2006	1 April 2007
Minister for Land Reform and Management	Prabhu Narayan Chaudhury	United Left Front	29 April 2006	1 April 2007
Minister for Water Supply	Chitra Lekha Yadav	Congress (Democratic)	22 May 2006	1 April 2007
Minister for Local Development	Rajendra Prasad Pandey	CPN (UML)	22 May 2006	1 April 2007
Minister for Culture, Tourism and Civil Aviation	Pradeep Kumar Gyawali	CPN (UML)	22 May 2006	1 April 2007
Minister for Education and Sports	Mangal Siddhi Manandhar	CPN (UML)	22 May 2006	1 April 2007
Minister for Industry, Commerce and Supplies	Hridayesh Tripathi	Sadbhavana (Anandidevi)	11 June 2006	15 March 2007
Ministers of State
Minister of State for Forests and Soil Conservation	Gopal Rai	Nepali Congress	22 May 2006	23 September 2006
Minister of State for Information and Communications	Dilendra Prasad Badu	Nepali Congress	22 May 2006	1 April 2007
Minister of State for Forests and Soil Conservation	Dilendra Prasad Badu	Nepali Congress	9 October 2006	1 April 2007
Minister of State for Women, Children and Social Welfare	Urmila Aryal	CPN (UML)	22 May 2006	1 April 2007
Minister of State for Forests and Soil Conservation	Man Bahadur Bishwakarma	Nepali Congress	22 May 2006	1 April 2007
Minister of State for General Administration	Dharmanath Prasad Sah	CPN (UML)	22 May 2006	1 April 2007
Minister of State for Labour and Transportation Management	Ramesh Lekhak	Congress (Democratic)	22 May 2006	1 April 2007
Minister of State for Water Supply	Gyanendra Bahadur Karki	Congress (Democratic)	11 June 2006	1 April 2007
