= Nepalese democracy movement =

Series of political movements from the 20th century to 2008

Nepalese Democracy Movement
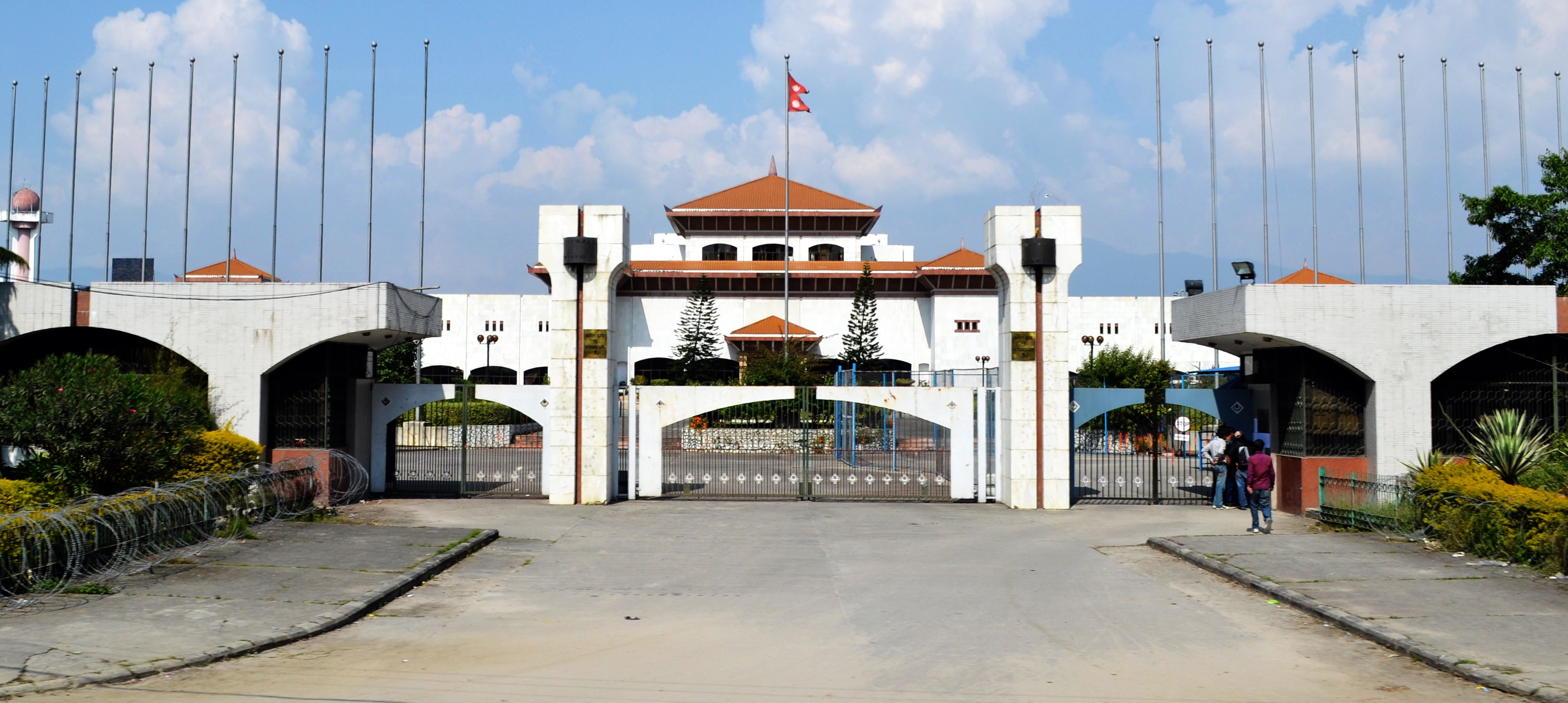
- Federal Parliament of Nepal
- Date: 1948–2008
- Location: Nepal
- Caused by: Political repression; Public participation; Standards of living
- Goals: Multi-party system; Democracy; Abolition of monarchy
- Methods: Strike; Street protesters; Insurgency; Introduced black day
- Result: Abolition of monarchy; Democracy

Parties
Government of Nepal	People's Movement	Nepal Communist Party

Lead figures
King Gyanendra	non-centralised leadership	Pushpa Kamal Dahal

The Nepalese democracy movement was the combination of a series of political initiatives and movements from the 20th century to 2008 that advocated the establishment of representative democracy, a multi-party political system and the abolition of monarchy in Nepal. It has seen three major movements, the Revolution of 1951, Jana Andolan and Loktantra Andolan (Nepali: लोकतन्त्र आन्दोलन, romanized: Loktantra Āndolan) which ultimately abolished the Shah monarchy, transitioned Nepal towards a republic and reintroduced multi-party bicameral democracy.

The beginning of a national movement for democracy in Nepal was the ousting of the Ranas, the long-established Nepalese royal family, in the mid-20th century which was influenced by ethnic and political developments from the Indian nationalist movement. However, this period of democracy ended in 1960 and the Panchayat system of government was introduced, abolishing recent democratic institutions, banning political parties and restricting some forms of freedom of speech.

Student protests in 1979 led to a referendum on the direction of the political system resulted in minor adaptations to the existing party-less system, at times increasing executive control over the opposition. A period of economic disputes with India and mounting repression in Nepal led to the Jana Andolan popular movement resulting in the re-establishment of multi-party democracy under a constitutional monarchy framework.

Until 2001, the economic and political situation progressed despite corruption, nepotism and the presence of a Maoist insurgency which developed into a nation-wide civil war between the Maoist insurgents and the Government of Nepal. Following the assassination of the Nepalese royal family, King Gyanendra took control of the government and ruled until 2006 through emergency powers enforcing nation-wide oppression of media and civil society. Widespread protests headed by a coalition of seven Nepalese Parties alongside the Maoists led to the resignation of the King and the reinstation of the Parliament, the abolishment of monarchy and transitioned Nepal towards a federal republic, marking an end to the country's civil war.

== Rana dynasty ==
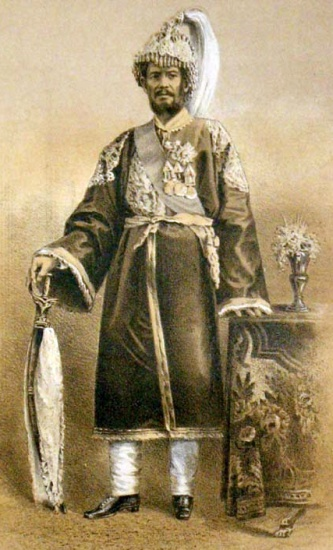
Portrait of Jung Bahadur Kunwar

As one of the regions oldest nation-states, Nepal was unified by the Shah Dynasty and has since been ruled by the Rana royal family after a coup d'état that installed Jung Bahadur Kunwar as prime minister, and later Maharaja of Kaski and Lamjung. During the 19th century, Nepal's expansionist aspirations came in conflict with the British Empire and the British East India Company culminating in the Anglo-Nepalese War of 1814-16.

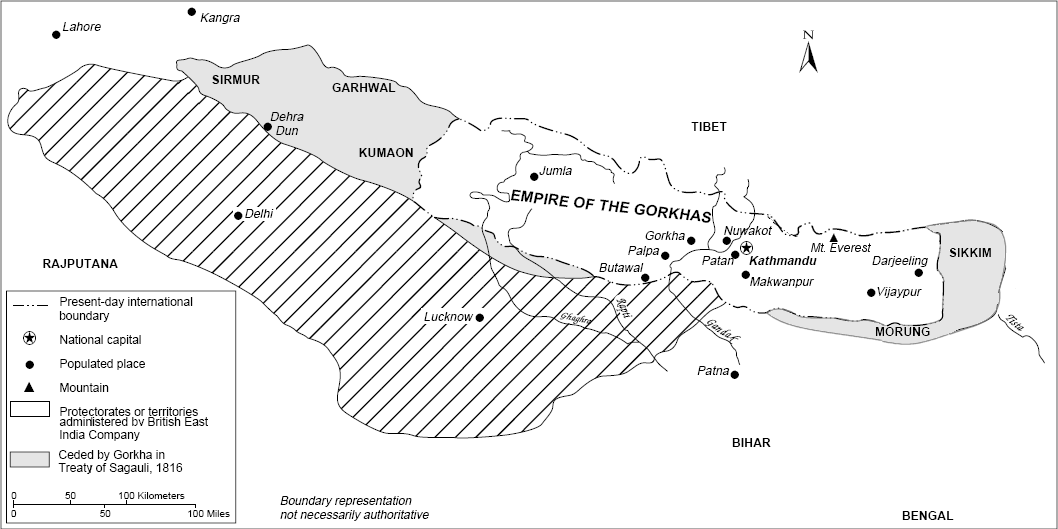
Sugauli Treaty and its effect on Nepalese territory

The war eventually concluded with the Treaty of Sugauli on 4 March 1816 which defined Nepal's current territorial boundaries. The treaty therefore spared Nepal of colonisation similar to that of neighbouring countries. Throughout the Shah dynasty Nepali society underwent a period of Sanskritisation which established the political, economic and cultural dominance of high-caste Indo-Aryans, most notably the Bahuns and Chhetri caste who established Khas Kura, later known as Nepali, as the official state language.

== Democracy movement of 1951 ==
The mid-20th century saw the emergence of an educated elite in Nepal due to an expansion of the country's education system leading to much increased literacy rates and rising levels of higher education attainment in the country. After India's independence, political parties were established and engaged an organised struggle against the Rana monarchy in neighbouring Nepal. The Nepal Communist Party was founded in 1949 with the goal to set up a democracy and People's Republic. Conversely, the Nepali Congress Party, later Nepali Congress, was formed in 1947 and gained support from the Nepal Communist Party to stage an armed revolution against the Rana monarchy. Under significant international and domestic pressure, the royal family and the Nepali Congress agreed to institute a peaceful and stable transition of democracy regarded as the Delhi Compromise of 1951. A transitional government was instituted with in a constitutional monarchy framework, and elections won by the Nepali Congress Party which was instrumental in abolishing the Rana regime and ran on a social-democratic basis. In December 1960 King Mahendra dissolved the parliament and devised a ban on political parties and police jailed members of political parties and members of the national cabinet.

== Panchayat era ==
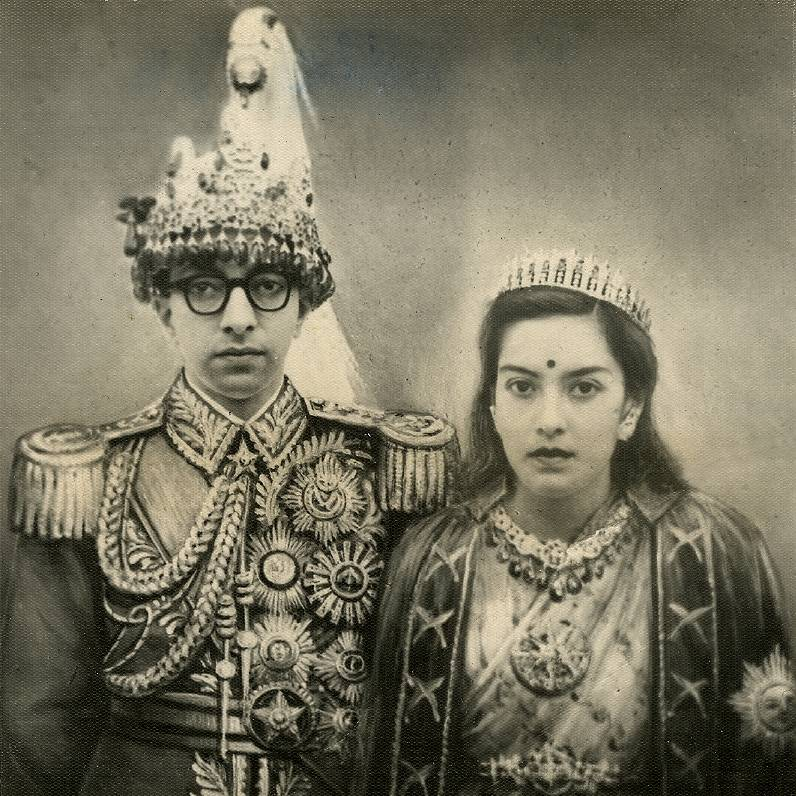
King Mahendra and Queen Ratna of Nepal in 1957

The King introduced the Panchayat system of governance which restructured political power to the King elections to holding direct elections at a communal level. While Panchayat legislation formally guaranteed freedom of speech, it was restricted through a number of royal laws, including lèse-majesté legislation which prohibited critique of the royal family. The political reforms restructured and curtailed the parliament's autonomy and authority as the King held executive power. Political representatives were strictly monitored on their loyalty to the monarch, and political representation held narrow. Popular discontent mounted in 1979 in student protests leading to a referendum on the future of the Panchayat system which resulted in the preservation of the Panchayat system with minor institutional reforms.

== Jana Andolan 1990 ==
Following a trade dispute with India that resulted in price hikes and shortages of consumer goods a coalition of seven political factions and the Nepali Congress lead a process of reintroduction of democracy in Nepal. In April 1990, students, human rights organisations and professional unions staged protests which led to the closure of universities and schools. The protests culminated in the first Jana Andolan, or People's Movement which pressured the King to reinstate multi-party democracy in the framework of a constitutional democracy. Its constitution declared Nepal as a Hindu state with Khasa-Nepali as the official language despite Nepal's poly-religious and linguistic population. The restoration of democracy in Nepal solidified a shift to neoliberal government policies that promoted economic liberalisation such as the removal of price controls, privatisation and introduction of convertibility for the domestic currency.

== Nepalese civil war ==
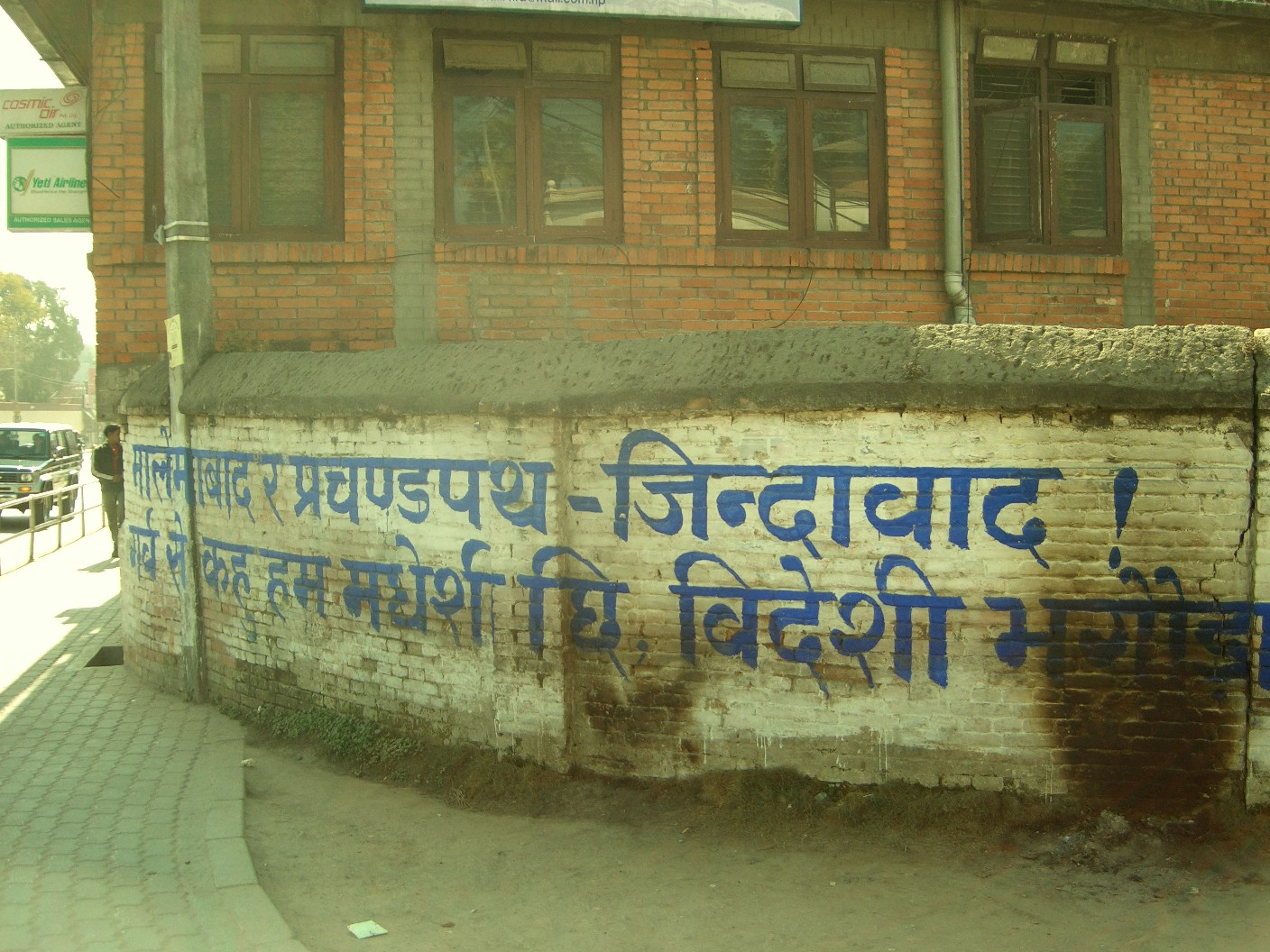
Communist graffiti in Kathmandu. It reads: "Long Live Marxism-Leninism-Maoism and Prachanda Path!"

The Nepalese civil war, or People’s War, was the result of stalled peace negotiations between the democratic government and the paramilitary wing of the Communist Party of Nepal (Maoist). It resulted in a build-up of around 30,000 insurgency fighters and caused approximately 13,000 casualties with thousands unaccounted for. Nepal's first decade of democracy is considered turbulent due to frequent government changes, internal party battles and corruption. Politics continued to be dominated by the Brahmin and Chhetri castes with an underrepresentation of ethnic minorities and women.

After the transition to the constitutional monarchy in 1991 Nepal remained one of the least developed countries, situated at 113 out of 130 countries in Human Development Index. General elections in 1999 produced a victory for the Nepali Congress, ushering in 4 years of political stability. The dissolution of the House of Representatives for the 1994 mid-term election led to a hung parliament producing 8 unstable coalition governments within 5 years. Following a split in the United People's Front into the recognised and unrecognised wing, led by Puspa Kamal Dahal, elections were boycotted, and armed rebellion was instigated. The government was presented with demands to institutionalise Nepal as a federal republic, therefore abolishing monarchy, formation of an interim government and the establishment of a constituent assembly.

On the 13 February 1996 the People’s War was declared in response to the perceived government failure to honour the insurgent's demands. On 1 June 2001 the royal family was murdered, triggering the crowning of Gyanendra as king. On 25 November 2001 a truce between the Maoist insurgents and the government broke following an increase in violent attacks against the police and army. This triggered the declaration of a national emergency and the passage of the Terrorist and Disruptive Activities (Control and Punishment) Ordinance (TADO). TADO declared the Maoists as terrorists and deployed the Royal Nepalese Army against them.

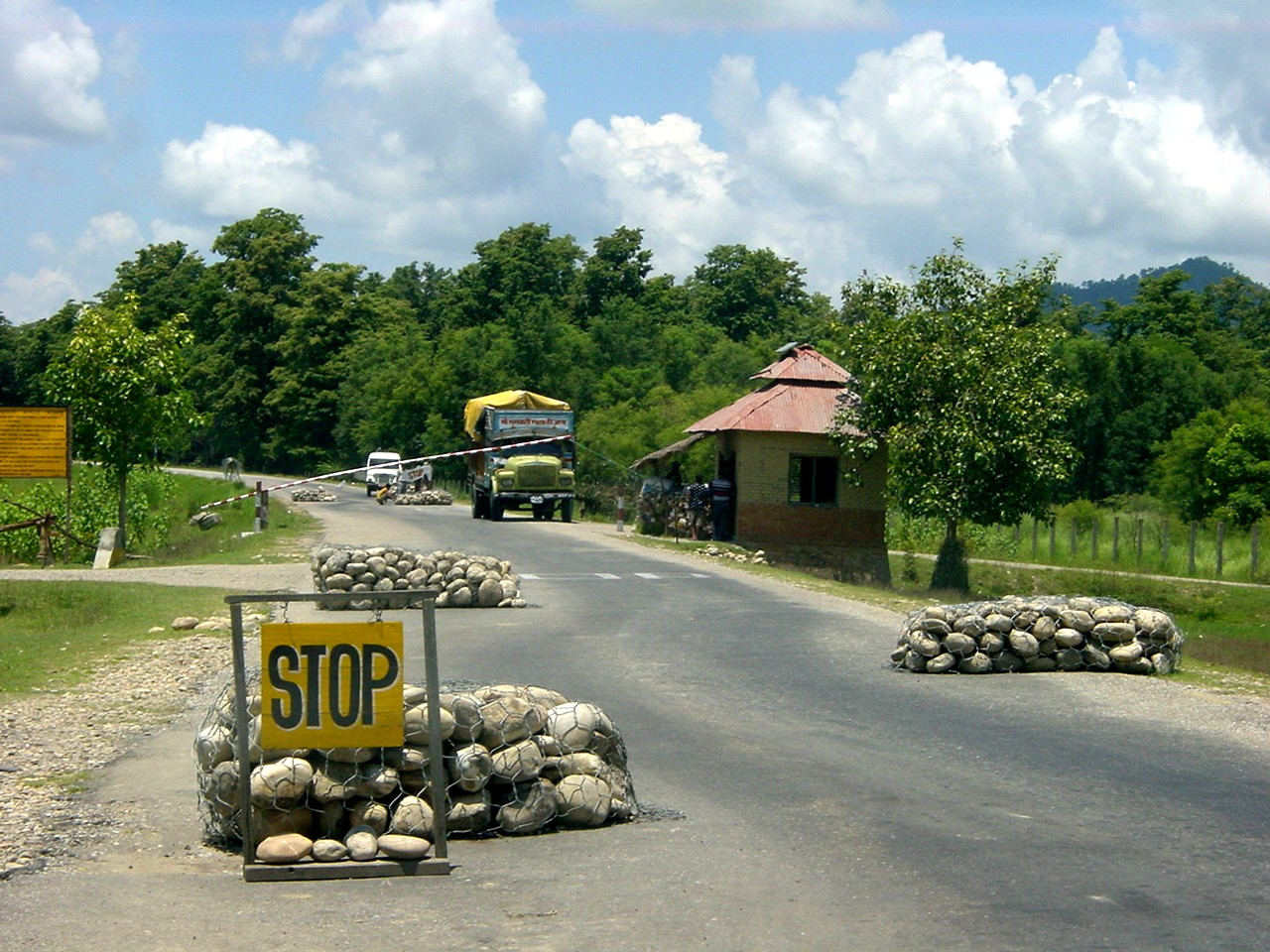
Checkpoints on the road leading from Nepalgunj to Tikapur in western Nepal due to security concerns with the Maoist insurgents.

Following political confrontations between members of the House of Representatives and King Gyanendra, several constitution articles were suspended, especially ones relating to freedom of speech, expression, press, movement and rights to peaceful protest. The then prime minister Deuba’s government stayed in office and ruled through government decrees until dismissed by Gyanendra due to a perceived inability to hold elections and quell the Maoist insurgency.

Deuba was replaced by Lokendra Bahadur, a former Panchayat politician and Nepalese royalist who failed to negotiate a peace deal with the Maoists and faced the rise of a popular pro-democracy movement joined by major Nepali political parties, including the Nepali Congress, Communist Party of Nepal (Unified Marxist–Leninist) (UML), Rashtriya Prajatantra Party, Nepal Congress Party (Democratic), United Left Front, Nepal Workers and Peasants Party.

After the reappointment of Deuba as prime minister the Nepali Congress (Democratic), UML and Rashtriya Prajatantra Party left the civil movement and joined the government. The TADO legislation was further renewed and has contributed to Nepal’s record numbers of unexplained forced disappearances in 2002 and 2003 (Malagodi 2013, p. 187). Following a brief period of political stability, King Gyanendra dismissed the Deuba government and assumed full executive control over the country through the declaration of a State of Emergency under the laws of the 1990 Constitution.

== Loktantra Andolan ==
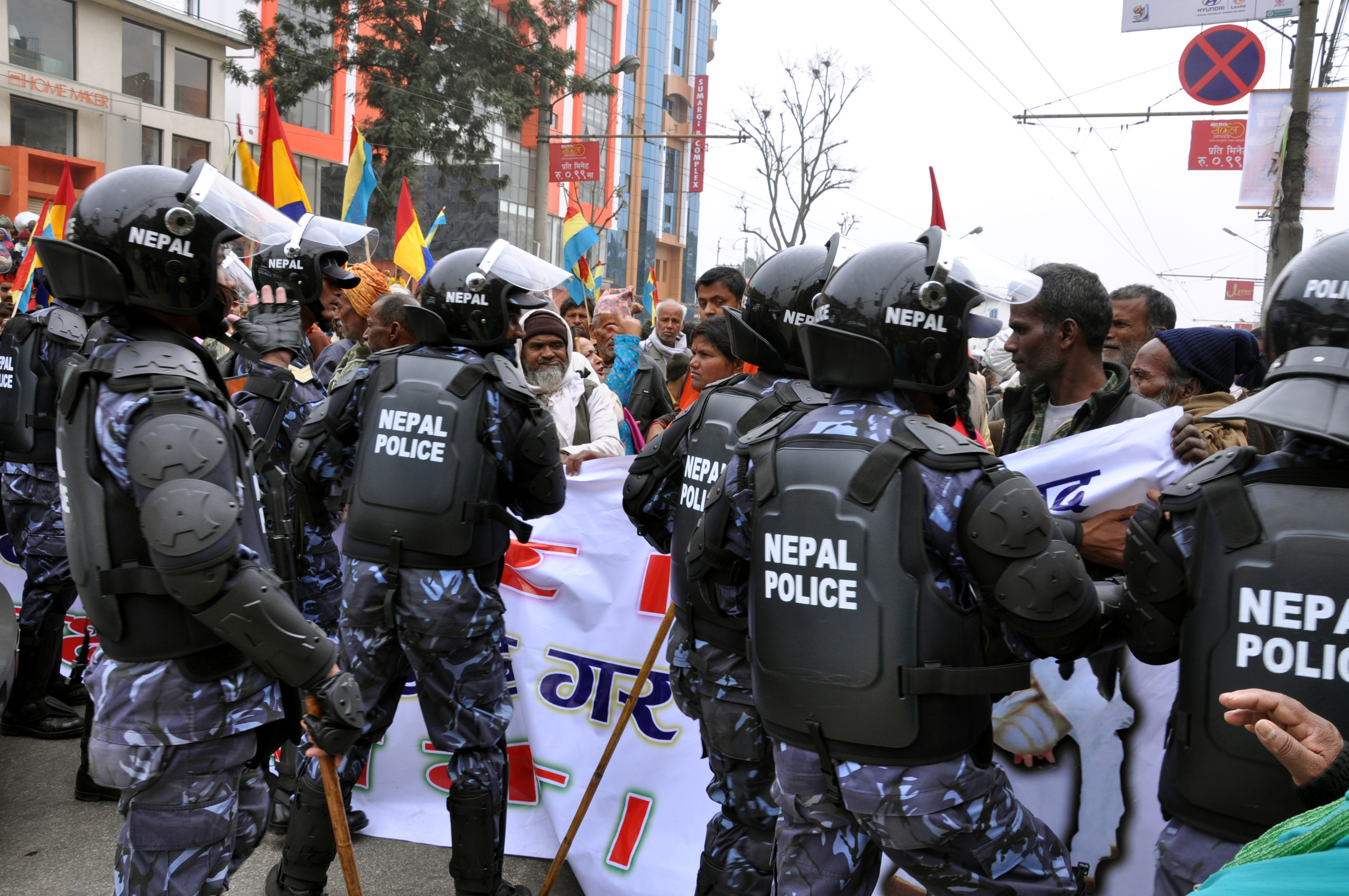

In 1996 the Maoist insurgency launched a violent campaign to overthrow the political-economic status quo, redistribute land and affect a ‘proletarian revolution’ in Nepal. The ensuing civil war caused human rights violations and killings of more than 13,000, as well as a decline in Nepal's GDP growth rate, fuelled by a drop in tourist arrivals and the destruction of infrastructure. Following the assassination of King Birendra and his family in 2001, the multi-party democracy was placed under a State of Emergency by the preceding King, tightly controlling the opposition, censoring news and media organisations, and shutting down telecommunications in parts of the country. The civil war developed into a military and political stalemate that ended in 2005. Protests against the political and economic situation drew an estimated 100,000 to 200,000 in Nepal's capital Kathmandu and 5 million in the entire country.

An alliance of seven political parties developed a coalition government, abolished the monarchy and signed a peace agreement with Maoist insurgents in 2006. This was achieved through cooperation between main-stream political parties and the Maoist insurgency facilitated though a 12-point agreement which outlined the democratic framework to be instituted after the abolition of monarchy. This framework set out the formation of an internationally monitored interim government, holding free and fair elections in a system of governance which guarantees civil, political and human rights, as well as the rule of law.

Furthermore, the Constitution was redrafted to:

1. remove the right and role of the monarch;
2. shift executive power to the Council of Ministers of the incumbent government therefore abolishing of the Raj Parishad, the royal advisory body;
3. remove terms that referred to the monarch as the leader of Nepal, such as "his majesty's government";
4. establish accountability for the Council of Ministers through the House of Representatives;
5. bring all executive organs of government, such as police, army and administration under the influence of the republican government;
6. compel the king to pay taxes on fortunes and estates;
7. integrate the Palace Service into the state civil service;
8. declare Nepal as a federal republic;
9. declare Nepal as a secular state;

The Royal Nepalese Army has been accused of suppressing the demonstrations with an unproportional use of force leading to a high-level investigation into law enforcement brutality towards the 2006 protests. After the release of the Rayamajhi Commission the government implemented its recommendations and dismissed the chiefs of Nepal's police organisations.

Following elections in 2008, the Communist Party of Nepal (Maoist) won 29.28% of the votes contrary to international predictions. Furthermore, the election increased the representation of women and ethnic minorities.

== See also ==
- 1951 Nepalese revolution
- 2006 Nepalese revolution
