= Dahal cabinet =

Dahal cabinet may refer to:

- First Dahal cabinet
- Second Dahal cabinet
- Third Dahal cabinet
