= Ranabhat =

Ranabhat (Nepali: रानाभाट) is a surname of people from Nepal. Notable people with the surname include:

- Eknath Ranabhat, Former member of Parliament of Nepal
- Taranath Ranabhat, Former speaker at Nepalese Parliament
