= Rishi Kattel =

Nepali politician

Personal details
- Party: Communist Party of Nepal

Rishi Kattel (Nepali: ऋषि कट्टेल) is the leader of one of the communist parties in Nepal. He is currently the Chairman of Communist Party of Nepal, which was formed in 2013 along with other communist leaders Lok Narayan Subedi, Jagat Bogati, Sharan Bikram Malla, Ram Bahadur Bhandari and Bhim Sedhai. He is the former chairman of Communist Party of Nepal (Unified).

Before forming the Communist Party of Nepal (Unified), he was one of the senior leaders of the Communist Party of Nepal (Marxist-Leninist) led by C. P. Mainali. He was originally the leader of the Communist Party of Nepal (Marxist) and later on, that of the Communist Party of Nepal (Unified Marxist-Leninist).

In 1998, he joined the Communist Party of Nepal (Marxist-Leninist) led by Bam Dev Gautam. In 2007, Communist Party of Nepal (Marxist-Leninist) led by him, Communist Party of Nepal (Unity Centre-Masal) led by Ram Singh Shris and Chitra Bahadur Ale, Communist Party of Nepal (Marxist-Leninist-Maoist Centre) led by Sitaram Tamang, and a communist party faction led by Bishnu Bahadur Tamang merged to form the Communist Party of Nepal (Unified).
