= Girija Prasad Koirala interim cabinet =

Government of Nepal from 2007 to 2008

- Cabinet of Nepal
- April 2007–October 2007
- Date formed: 1 April 2007
- Date dissolved: 18 August 2008

People and organisations
- Monarch: King Gyanendra
- Prime Minister: Girija Prasad Koirala
- Total no. of members: 24 appointments
- Member party: Nepali Congress CPN (Maoist) CPN (UML) Nepali Congress (Democratic) Janamorcha Nepal United Left Front Sadbhavana (Anandidevi)
- Status in legislature: National unity government

History
- Legislature term: 2006–2008
- Predecessor: Fifth G.P. Koirala cabinet
- Successor: First Dahal cabinet

The Girija Prasad Koirala interim cabinet was formed on 1 April 2007. The interim cabinet was formed as a national unity government which included the former Maoist rebels.

The cabinet was dissolved on 18 August 2008 following the 2008 Constituent Assembly election, following which Pushpa Kamal Dahal was appointed prime minister.

== Cabinet ==
Portfolio	Minister	Party	Took office	Left office
Prime Minister of Nepal; Minister for Defence	Girija Prasad Koirala	Nepali Congress	1 April 2007	18 August 2008
Deputy Prime Minister; Minister for Peace and Reconstruction	Ram Chandra Poudel	Nepali Congress	1 April 2007	18 August 2008
Minister for Foreign Affairs	Sahana Pradhan	CPN (UML)	1 April 2007	18 August 2008
Minister for Information and Communications	Krishna Bahadur Mahara	CPN (Maoist)	1 April 2007	18 August 2008
Minister for Education and Sports	Pradeep Nepal	CPN (UML)	1 April 2007	18 August 2008
Minister for Population and Environment	Mahantha Thakur	Nepali Congress	1 April 2007	10 December 2007
Minister for Finance	Ram Sharan Mahat	Nepali Congress	1 April 2007	18 August 2008
Minister for Law, Justice and Parliamentary Affairs	Narendra Bikram Nembang	Nepali Congress	1 April 2007	18 August 2008
Minister for Home Affairs	Krishna Prasad Sitaula	Nepali Congress	1 April 2007	18 August 2008
Minister for Industry, Commerce and Supplies	Krishna Prasad Sitaula	Nepali Congress	30 September 2007	18 August 2008
Minister for Local Development	Dev Prasad Gurung	CPN (Maoist)	1 April 2007	18 August 2008
Minister for Industry, Commerce and Supplies	Rajendra Mahato	Sadbhavana (Anandidevi)	1 April 2007	30 September 2007
Minister for Culture, Tourism and Civil Aviation	Prithvi Subba Gurung	CPN (UML)	1 April 2007	18 August 2008
Minister for Forests and Soil Conservation	Matrika Prasad Yadav	CPN (Maoist)	1 April 2007	18 August 2008
Minister for Agriculture and Cooperatives	Chhabilal Bishwakarma	CPN (UML)	1 April 2007	18 August 2008
Minister for Physical Planning and Construction	Hisila Yami	CPN (Maoist)	1 April 2007	18 August 2008
Minister for Land Reform and Management	Jagat Bahadur Bogati	United Left Front	1 April 2007	18 August 2008
Minister for Women, Children and Social Welfare	Khadga Bahadur Bishwakarma	CPN (Maoist)	1 April 2007	18 August 2008
Minister for Health	Giriraj Mani Pokharel	Janamorcha	29 April 2007	18 August 2008
Ministers of State
Minister of State for Labour and Transportation Management	Ramesh Lekhak	Nepali Congress	1 April 2007	18 August 2008
Minister of State for Water Supply	Gyanendra Bahadur Karki	Nepali Congress	1 April 2007	18 August 2008
Minister of State for General Administration	Ram Chandra Yadav	CPN (UML)	1 April 2007	18 August 2008
Minister of State for Law, Justice and Parliamentary Affairs	Indra Bahadur Gurung	Nepali Congress	1 April 2007	18 August 2008
Minister of State for Education and Sports	Mohan Singh Rathore	CPN (UML)	1 April 2007	18 August 2008
Minister of State for Health	Shashi Shrestha	Janamorcha	19 August 2007	18 August 2008
