= Nanda Kumar Prasai =

Nepalese politician

Nanda Kumar Prasai (born c. 1947) is a Nepalese politician.

During the 1990 popular uprising, Prasai's group was part of the United National People's Movement. Ahead of the 1994 election and after the split in the United People's Front, Prasai's faction joined the Baidya faction of UPF and Prasai was named vice chairman of the UPF Central Committee. By 1995 Prasai was the chairman of the Revolutionary Left Front, Nepal - a new coalition positioning itself between 'the revisionist UML and the so-called Maoists'.

During the 2006 popular uprising Prasai served as the chairman of the United Left Front.

After the merger of the Prasai and Shestra factions, Prasai became the general secretary of the Communist Party of Nepal (Marxist–Leninist–Maoist Centre).

In 2007 he was nominated to the interim legislature of Nepal, on behalf of the United Left Front.

He was selected to join the 1st Nepalese Constituent Assembly from the Proportional Representation quota of Communist Party of Nepal (Maoist) representing Morang district, following the 2008 Nepalese Constituent Assembly election.

In 2010 he was inducted into the politburo of the Unified Communist Party of Nepal (Maoist).

When CPN(UML) and UCPN(Maoist) merged into the Nepal Communist Party, Prasai was included in the Standing Committee of the party. During the November 2019 merger process, he was named chairman of the Senior Communist Forum.

In the factional conflict within the party between K.P. Oli on one side and Prachanda and Madhav Kumar Nepal on the other, Prasai emerged as a leading figure in the Prachanda-Nepal faction.
