= Office of Nepal Trust =

Office of Nepal Trust is a government entity in Nepal, instituted to manage the nationalized properties that belonged to the royal family. The ONT was instituted after the 2006 Loktantra Andolan. Uday Raj Sharma is the head of ONT. As of May 2008, the OTN managed 12 former royal palaces and five jungle areas.
