= Urbadutta Pant =

Nepalese politician

Urba Datt Pant

Personal details
- Party: CPN (United)

Urba Datt Pant is a Nepalese politician, a Standing Committee member of the CPN (United). He used to be central committee member of CPN UML He was elected to the Pratinidhi Sabha in the 1994 election.

He later became a member of the Rashtriya Sabha (Upper House of Parliament). In 2004 he was named State Minister for Labour and Transport Management in the cabinet of Sher Bahadur Deuba, when the CPN(UML) joined that government. Pant was appointed as a Member of Parliament, when the interim legislature was formed in January 2007.

== See also ==
- CPN (United)
