= Communist Party of Nepal (Maoist) =

Communist Party of Nepal (Maoist) may refer to:

- Communist Party of Nepal (Maoist Centre), between 1996 and 2009 named the "Communist Party of Nepal (Maoist)"
- Communist Party of Nepal (Revolutionary Maoist), founded June 2012
- Communist Party of Nepal (Maoist) (2025)

== See also ==
- Communist Party of Nepal (disambiguation)
