= Seven Party Alliance =

Coalition of Nepali political parties

The Seven Party Alliance was a coalition of seven Nepali political parties seeking to end autocratic rule in the country. They spearheaded the Loktantra Andolan.

The alliance was made up of the following parties:

- Nepali Congress
- Nepali Congress (Democratic)
- Communist Party of Nepal (Unified Marxist-Leninist) (Withdrew from government, Sunday May 3, 2009)
- Nepal Workers and Peasants Party
- Nepal Goodwill Party (Anandi Devi)
- United Left Front
- People's Front

These seven parties made up 194 of the 205 seats allocated in the 1999 Nepalese legislative elections, the only significant exception being the Monarchist Rashtriya Prajatantra Party. The RPP split into three factions, with one faction openly supporting the royal take-over and the two others maintaining criticism towards it.

The name "Seven Party Alliance" has always been a misnomer, since one of its members (ULF) is an alliance in itself, consisting of three parties. Moreover, the two largest members, Congress and the CPN(UML) are each much larger than the rest of the members put together.

They pressured the monarch and the king had to accept their demands for an elected parliament.
