= Communist Party of Nepal (Marxist–Leninist–Maoist Centre) =

Communist Party in Nepal formed in November 2005

Communist Party of Nepal (Marxist–Leninist–Maoist Centre) (Nepali: नेपाल कम्युनिष्ट पार्टी (मार्क्सवादी-लेनिनवादी-माओवादी केन्द्र), abbreviated नेकपा (मालेमा केन्द्र)) was a communist party in Nepal. It was formed on November 15, 2005, through the merger of the Communist Party of Nepal (Marxist-Leninist-Maoist) and the Nepal Samyabadi Party (Marksbadi-Leninbadi-Maobadi). The party was led by Krishna Das Shrestra (chairman) and Nanda Kumar Prasai (general secretary).

CPN (mLM Centre) formed part of the United Left Front and participated in the 2006 Loktantra Andolan. In January 2007, CPN (mLM Centre) gained parliamentary representation as N.K. Prasai became of the three nominated MPs of the ULF.

The janajati wing of the party was the Nepal Janajati Mukti Andolan, led by Sitaram Tamang.

In February 2007, a breakaway group of CPN (mLM Centre) led by Sitaram Tamang merged into Communist Party of Nepal (Unified).

In a meeting in Kathmandu in May 2007, Prachanda announced that CPN (mLM Centre) was to merge with the Communist Party of Nepal (Maoist). An agreement on a merger was reached on September 23, 2007. A unification ceremony was held on September 24, 2007. The act of unification was signed by N.K. Prasai and Dinanath Sharma. Through the merger with CPN (mLM Centre), CPN (Maoist) became the second largest party in the interim parliament. After the merger, Krishna Das Shrestha became Chief Advisor of the CPN (Maoist).

== See also ==
- List of communist parties in Nepal
