= Krishna Das Shrestha =

Nepali politician

Krishna Das Shrestha (Nepali: कृष्णदास श्रेष्ठ) is a Nepalese politician who broke away from the Bagmati District Committee - which functioned semi-autonomously - of the Communist Party of Nepal in 1969 to found the Communist Party of Nepal (Marxist–Leninist–Maoist) in 1981. Shrestha was the party president.
