= United Left Front (Nepal, 2002) =

United Left Front (Nepali: संयुक्त बाम मोर्चा), a joint front of Nepalese communist parties. ULF was founded on October 3, 2002, with the aim of mobilizing against the autocratic rule in the country.

The founding constituents of ULF were:

- Communist Party of Nepal (Marxist)
- Communist Party of Nepal (Marxist-Leninist)
- Communist Party of Nepal (Marxist-Leninist-Maoist)
- Nepal Samyabadi Party (Marksbadi-Leninbadi-Maobadi)
- Communist Party of Nepal (United)

CPN(MLM) and NSP(Malema) later merged to form the Communist Party of Nepal (Marxist-Leninist-Maoist Centre). CPN(M) and CPN(United) merged to form the Communist Party of Nepal (United Marxist). Therefore, as of 2006 the coalition consisted of:

- Communist Party of Nepal (Marxist-Leninist-Maoist Centre)
- Communist Party of Nepal (United Marxist)
- Communist Party of Nepal (Marxist-Leninist)

ULF joined part the Seven Party Alliance (now Eight Party Alliance), and took part in the 2006 Loktantra Andolan. When the interim parliament was formed in January 2007, ULF got to nominate three MPs, C.P. Mainali of CPN(ML), Ganesh Shah of CPN(UM) and N.K. Prasai of CPN(MLM Centre).

All constituents of ULF experienced splits in late 2006/early 2007, leading to the break-up of the ULF. Splinter groups of CPN(ML) and CPN(MLM Centre) merged into Communist Party of Nepal (Unified). CPN(UM) was split as Ganesh Shah set up a separate Communist Party of Nepal (United). CPN(UM) and CPN(Unified) formed one ULF, and the remainder of the original ULF retained theirs. In September 2007 CPN(MLM Centre) merged into Communist Party of Nepal (Maoist).

== See also ==
- United Left Front (Nepal) (1990)
