= Communist Party of Nepal (2013) =

Communist Party of Nepal नेपाल कम्युनिष्ट पार्टी
- President: Rishi Kattel
- Founded: 2013
- Merger of: CPN (Unified); CPN ML (Socialist); CPN (United Marxist); Marxist CPN; Birodhi ML; Independent Thought Group
- Headquarters: Kathmandu
- Ideology: Communism; Maoism
- Colours: Red

Website
- communistpartyofnepal.com

The Communist Party of Nepal (Nepali: नेपाल कम्युनिष्ट पार्टी) is a political party in Nepal founded in April 2013. The party was formed through the merger of Communist Party of Nepal (Unified), Communist Party of Nepal Marxist−Leninist (Samajbadi), Communist Party of Nepal (United Marxist), Marxist Communist Party of Nepal, Bidrohi ML and the Independent Thought Group. Rishi Kattel is the chairman of the party. Jagat Bahadur Bogati and Lok Narayan Subedi serve as co-chairs of the party, whilst Haridev Gyawali, Ram Bahadur Bhandari and Tanka Rai serve as vice-chairs.

== History ==
The party was a constituent of a 33-party alliance formed to boycott the election along with Communist Party of Nepal (Revolutionary Maoist) and other parties but In May 2013 the party was registered with the Election Commission of Nepal ahead of the 2013 Constituent Assembly election. It presented 60 candidates in FPTP constituencies. For the Proportional Representation vote the party submitted a list of 100 candidates, headed by Sita Subedi. The election symbol of the party is a hammer and sickle. The party failed to get any seats in the elections.

When the Netra Bikram Chand-led Communist Party of Nepal Maoist changed its name to the "Communist Party of Nepal", Rishi Kattel warned him not to misuse his party's name for illegal activities.

In 2018, when the Nepal Communist Party was formed, it had to change its name from the "Communist Party of Nepal", as Kattel's party was already registered with the Election Commission. Kattel challenged the decision of the Election Commission to register the new party as the NCP, as he believed the name was still too close to that of his party.

== Electoral performance ==
Election	Leader	Votes		Seats
Election	Leader	No.	%	Seats
2013	Rishi Kattel	18,140	0.19	0 / 575

== See also ==
- List of communist parties in Nepal
