= Nepal Samyabadi Party (Marksbadi–Leninbadi–Maobadi) =

Defunct Communist political party of Nepal

Nepal Samyabadi Party (Marksbadi–Leninbadi–Maobadi) (Nepali for 'Communist Party of Nepal (Marxist-Leninist-Maoist)') was a small communist party in Nepal, formed out of a split from the Communist Party of Nepal (Marxist-Leninist-Maoist). The party was often called NSP(Malema) or Communist Party of Nepal (Samyabadi). The general secretary of NSP(Malema) was Nanda Kumar Prasai. Another leading member of the party was Kumar Belbase.

In the 1999 parliamentary election, NSP(Malema) ran three candidates; Lila Situala in Jhapa-4 (66 votes), Darap Lal Sardar in Morang-5 (64 votes) and Mukund Khanal in Morang-6 (60 votes).

NSP(Malema) joined the United Left Front in 2002.

In late 2005 NSP(Malema) merged with CPN(MLM) and formed the Communist Party of Nepal (Marxist-Leninist-Maoist Centre).

== See also ==
- List of communist parties in Nepal
