= Communist Party of Nepal (United Marxist) =

Communist Party of Nepal (United Marxist) नेपाल कम्युनिष्ट पार्टी (संयुक्त मार्क्सवादी)
- President: Hemanta B.C.
- Secretary: Lok Narayan Subedi
- Founded: 2005
- Dissolved: 2013
- Merger of: CPN (United); CPN (Marxist)
- Succeeded by: Communist Party of Nepal (2013)
- Student wing: Nepal Progressive Student Federation
- Ideology: Communism; Marxism
- Political position: Left-wing

Election symbol

Party flag
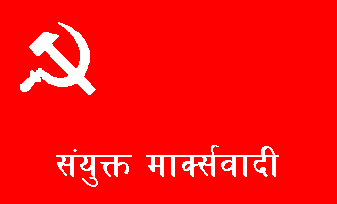

The Communist Party of Nepal (United Marxist) was a political party in Nepal existing from 2005 until 2013.

== History ==
The party was formed on 15 September 2005 through the merger of Communist Party of Nepal (United) and Communist Party of Nepal (Marxist). The party was a member of the United Left Front during the 2006 Nepalese revolution.

Bishnu Bahadur Manandhar, general secretary of CPN (United), was the general secretary of the party but later stepped down, and Prabhu Narayan Chaudhari, president of the CPN (Marxist), was the president of the party. The founding unification conference also elected a 34-member Central Committee and an 82-member National Council. The trade union wing of CPN (UM) was Nepal Progressive Trade Union Federation (NPTUF) and the students wing of the party was the Nepal Progressive Student Federation (NPSF).

In mid-October 2006, the party went through an internal crisis. Prabhu Narayan Chaudhuri received harsh criticism from party members over his actions as Minister of Land Reforms. On 14 October, he was gheraoed in his office by party cadres. Ten politburo members, including both Manandhar and Chaudhuri, resigned. Chandra Deo Joshi was appointed acting chairman whereas Lok Narayan Subedi became the new general secretary of the party. In 2007, Ganesh Shah and Chandra Deo Joshi broke away from the party and refounded CPN (United).

The party contested the 2008 Constituent Assembly election but failed to get a seat. In April 2013, the party merged with five other parties and formed the Communist Party of Nepal which received its registration for contesting the 2013 Constituent Assembly election.

== Electoral performance ==
Election	Leader	Votes		Seats	Position	Resulting government
Election	Leader	No.	%	No.	Position	Resulting government
2008	Hemanta Bahadur B.C.	18,717	0.17	0 / 575	29th	Extra-parliamentary

== See also ==
- List of communist parties in Nepal
