= Communist Party of Nepal (Unified) =

Communist Party of Nepal (Unified) नेपाल कम्युनिष्ट पार्टी (एकिकृत)
- Secretary: Raj Singh Shris
- Founded: 2007
- Dissolved: April 2013
- Succeeded by: Communist Party of Nepal (2013)
- Ideology: Communism; Marxism–Leninism

Election symbol

Website
- cpnunified.org.np

Communist Party of Nepal (Unified) (Nepali: नेपाल कम्युनिष्ट पार्टी (एकिकृत)) was a communist party in Nepal. The party was formed in 2007 through the merger of three groups:

- A breakaway group of the Communist Party of Nepal (Marxist-Leninist) led by Rishi Kattel.
- A breakaway group of Communist Party of Nepal (Unity Centre-Masal), whose Janamorcha Nepal faction was led by Chitra Bahadur Ale
- A breakaway group of Communist Party of Nepal (Marxist-Leninist-Maoist Centre) led by Sitaram Tamang

The General Secretary of the party is Ram Singh Shris (Rajbir). The party had two members in the interim legislature of Nepal, Pari Thapa and Navraj Subedi.

In April 2013 the party merged into the Communist Party of Nepal.

== CA polls ==
The party presented its manifesto for the Constituent Assembly polls on March 10, 2008. The party proposes making Nepal into a federal republic with 11 states and 2 sub-states, based on ethnicity, language and geography. It proposes having a ceremonial president, and resting executive powers in the office of the Prime Minister. According to its manifesto, there would be a limit of two mandate periods for the Prime Ministership. Both Prime Minister and president would be elected by the parliament.

The party won two seats through the Proportional Representation vote, but no seat in the First Past the Post system.

=== Split ===
A faction of Communist Party of Nepal (Unified) led by Nabaraj Subedi merged with the Unified CPN (Maoist) in April 2010.

Maoist chairman Pushpa Kamal Dahal and CPN (Unified) leader Nabaraj Subedi signed a memo on the unification between the two parties at a programme in the capital Katmandhu on April 3, 2010.

According to leaders, they have agreed to settle ideological issues at the upcoming general convention of the Maoist party.

They said local level organizational matters would be settled by forming a taskforce.

== Electoral performance ==
Election	Votes		Seats	Position	Resulting government
Election	#	%	#	Position	Resulting government
2008	48,600	0.45	2 / 575	19th	CPN (Maoist)–CPN (UML)–MJFN

== See also ==
- List of communist parties in Nepal
