= Ram Bahadur Thapa =

Nepalese politician

- रामबहादुर थापा

Vice chairman of CPN (UML)
- Incumbent
- Assumed office 30 November 2021

Minister for Home Affairs
- In office 26 February 2018 – 20 May 2021
- President: Bidhya Devi Bhandari
- Prime Minister: Khadga Prasad Oli
- Preceded by: Sher Bahadur Deuba
- Succeeded by: Khagaraj Adhikari

Member of National Assembly from Bagmati
- In office 2017 – 18 April 2021
- Preceded by: Position Established
- Succeeded by: Dr. Khim Lal Devkota

Minister of Defence
- In office 18 August 2008 – 25 May 2009
- President: Ram Baran Yadav
- Prime Minister: Pushpa Kamal Dahal

Personal details
- Born: 12 May 1955 (age 71) Gulmi, Nepal
- Party: CPN (UML) (2021-present)
- Other political affiliations: Communist Party of Nepal (Maoist Centre) (2016-2018); Nepal Communist Party (NCP) (2018-2021)

Ram Bahadur Thapa Magar (Nepali: रामबहादुर थापा), also known by his nom de guerre Badal, is a Nepalese politician and a vice chairman of the CPN (UML). He is currently a member and the parliamentary party leader of the CPN (UML) in the parliament. He previously served as Minister of Home Affairs from 2018 to 2021.

== Political life ==
Before the establishment of the Nepal Communist Party, he was General Secretary of the Communist Party of Nepal (Maoist Centre). He was formerly the member of National Assembly from Bagmati Province.

Thapa was the Minister for Defence during the Katawal incident, which led to the resignation of Pushpa Kamal Dahal.

Thapa led a group of MPs, MLAs and fellow leaders who joined CPN (UML) leaving CPN (Maoist Centre) following the split in Nepal Communist Party.

== Electoral history ==
=== 2008 Constituent Assembly election ===
Chitwan-2
Party	Candidate	Votes
CPN (Maoist)	Ram Bahadur Thapa	21,409
Nepali Congress	Eknath Rababhat	13,009
CPN (Unified Marxist–Leninist)	Kashi Nath Adhikari	11,312
CPN (Marxist–Leninist)	Bhagwati Ghimire	2,179
Others		1,775
Invalid votes		2,272
Result	Maoist gain	
Source: Election Commission

== See also ==
- 2021 split in Communist Party of Nepal (Maoist Centre)
- KP Sharma Oli
