= Kiran Gurung =

Nepali politician

Personal details
- Party: Communist Party of Nepal (Unified Marxist-Leninist)

Kiran Gurung (Nepali: किरण गुरुङ) is a Nepalese politician. He is a Central Committee member of the Communist Party of Nepal (Unified Marxist-Leninist). In the 2008 Constituent Assembly election he was elected from the Tanahu-3 constituency, winning 14786 votes.

In the Maoist led Government, Gurung was appointed as the Forest and Soil Conservation Minister.
