= Ramcharan Chaudhari (Tharu) =

Nepali politician

Phulmati Devi Chaudhari
- रामचरण चौधरी
- Incumbent
- Assumed office 2008
- Constituency: Bardiya-4

Personal details
- Party: Communist Party of Nepal (Maoist Centre)

Ramcharan Chaudhari (Tharu) (Nepali: रामचरण चौधरी) is a Nepalese politician, belonging to the Communist Party of Nepal (Maoist Centre). In the 2008 Constituent Assembly election he was elected from the Bardiya-4 constituency, winning 24444 votes.
