= Gopal Kirati =

Nepali politician

Personal details
- Party: Communist Party of Nepal (Maoist Centre)

Gopal Kirati (Nepali: गोपाल किराँती) is a Nepalese politician of Nepal. He is a member of Communist Party of Nepal (Maoist Centre).
