= Nepal Communist Party =

Defunct communist party in Nepal

Nepal Communist Party नेपाली कम्युनिष्ट पार्टी
- Abbreviation: NCP (English) नेकपा (Nepali)
- Chairperson: Pushpa Kamal Dahal; KP Sharma Oli
- General Secretary: Bishnu Prasad Paudel
- Presidium: Secretariat of the Nepal Communist Party
- Spokesperson: Narayan Kaji Shrestha
- Founded: 17 May 2018
- Dissolved: 8 March 2021
- Merger of: CPN (Maoist Centre); CPN (Unified Marxist–Leninist)
- Succeeded by: CPN (Maoist Centre); CPN (Unified Marxist–Leninist)
- Headquarters: Aakirti Marg, Dhumbarahi (Kathmandu)
- Student wing: All Nepal National Free Students Union
- Youth wing: National Youth Union, Nepal
- Labour wing: GEFONT; ANTUF
- Ideology: Communism; Marxism–Leninism; People's Multiparty Democracy; Democratic centralism; Secularism; Federalism; Factions: Marxism–Leninism–Maoism–Prachanda Path
- Political position: Left-wing; Factions: Centre-left to far-left
- International affiliation: IMCWP
- Colors: Red
- Anthem: "The Internationale"

Party flag

The Nepal Communist Party, abbreviated NCP (Nepali: नेपाल कम्युनिष्ट पार्टी, pronounced [neˈpal ˈkʌmjunisʈ ˈpa(r)ʈi]) was Marxist-Leninist party in Nepal that existed from 2018 to 2021. It was founded on 17 May 2018, from the unification of two leftist parties, Communist Party of Nepal (Unified Marxist–Leninist) and Communist Party of Nepal (Maoist Centre). The unification was completed by the Party Unification Coordination Committee, after eight months of negotiation. The two predecessor parties subsequently dissolved, making way for the new united party. The party retained the electoral symbol of the CPN (UML), the sun.

The party was the largest political party in the House of Representatives, National Assembly and in all provincial assemblies except No. 2. Former prime minister of Nepal Pushpa Kamal Dahal and K. P. Sharma Oli, both served as the chairmen of the party. After internal conflicts in the party and the dissolution of parliament, the party splintered into two major factions. On 8 March 2021, Nepal's Supreme Court stated that the allocation of the name "Nepal Communist Party" upon the merger of the CPN-UML and CPN (Maoist Centre), and by extension the merger itself, was void ab initio, as the name was already allotted to a party led by Rishiram Kattel, and that the NCP stood "dismissed". Upon the ruling, the two predecessor parties were revived in their original state immediately prior to the merger, although should the two wish to merge again with proper procedure being followed, it would be fully allowed.

== History ==
=== Left alliance and unification ===
On 3 October 2017, the two major communist parties, the Communist Party of Nepal (Unified Marxist–Leninist) and the Communist Party of Nepal (Maoist Centre) who were second and third largest party of Nepal respectively announced a coalition for the upcoming legislative and provincial election. This was joined by Naya Shakti Party led by former prime minister Baburam Bhattarai. This was a practice to side line the largest party of Nepal, Nepali Congress from government and decrease its strength in parliament. The three parties also announced plans for unification following the election with the formation of a Unification Coordination Committee.

On 14 October 2017, Naya Shakti Party broke from the alliance citing differences with the two parties. The alliance between the two parties won a majority in the House of Representatives and in six of the seven provincial assemblies. Following the elections, it was decided that CPN (Unified Marxist–Leninist) would get chief ministers in Province No. 1, Bagmati Province, Gandaki Province and Lumbini Province, and CPN (Maoist Centre) would get chief ministers in Karnali Province and Sudurpashchim Province. The party also won a two-thirds majority in the National Assembly. Following the formation of the Federal Parliament of Nepal, parliamentary party leader of the Communist Party of Nepal (Unified Marxist–Leninist), Khadga Prasad Oli was sworn in as Prime Minister on 15 February 2018. The merger of the two parties was initially announced for 22 April 2018, to coincide with the formation of the original Communist Party of Nepal in 1949, but the unification was put on hold citing insufficient time to sort out remaining issues.

The CPN (Unified Marxist–Leninist) and CPN (Maoist Centre) dissolved their central committees on 17 May 2018 and the new party was formed on the same day. Khadga Prasad Oli and Pushpa Kamal Dahal would serve as joint chairmen of the party until a general convention was held. The party also named its Standing Committee consisting of 26 members of the former UML and 19 members of the former Maoist Centre on 12 June 2018. The provincial committees of the party were finalized on 4 December 2018. The district committees were finalized on 22 April 2019, and the district in-charges were appointed on 22 July 2019.

=== Internal conflict ===
In a party secretariat meeting on 21 August 2019, senior leader of the party Madhav Kumar Nepal registered a note on dissent regarding the work division in the party and criticizing the two co-chairmen, K.P. Sharma Oli and Pushpa Kamal Dahal, for not completing the merger process sooner. He also criticized Oli for not following the "One Leader, One Position" policy that the party had decided on and called for Oli to either resign as party leader or as prime minister. A meeting of the secretariat on 21 November 2019, the party decided on continuing with two leaders but made Dahal the executive head of the party. The meeting also decided on letting Oli complete his full term as prime minister instead of the agreement between the two leaders to lead the government in turns. The cabinet was also reshuffled after criticisms of the government from within the party. A rift within the party was also formed after some factions in the party did not favor a grant under the Millennium Challenge Corporation that the government had agreed with the United States government. A task force formed by the party decided on not endorsing the agreement without amendments.

Bam Dev Gautam was appointed as the party's vice-chairman after the central committee of the party amended the party statute. Party co-chairman, Pushpa Kamal Dahal and Madhav Kumar Nepal criticized the Oli governments handling of the COVID-19 pandemic and leaders within the party urged the senior leadership in the party to call a meeting of the party secretariat to discuss the government work. At the meeting of the party secretariat some leaders called on Oli's resignation but a later meeting decided to allow Oli to after he agreed to work under the party's instructions and let Dahal perform his duties as the party's executive leader. A panel formed by the party to solve the internal dispute proposed that a national convention of the party be held in April 2021 to solve issues regarding the party unity and the proposal was endorsed by the standing committee of the party. Another cabinet reshuffle was done on 16 October 2020 but Oli was criticized by the party for not consulting the party.

On 14 November 2020, co-chairman Pushpa Kamal Dahal presented a political document at a party secretariat meeting that accused K.P. Sharma Oli of not following the party's directions, unilaterally leading the government and turning a blind eye towards corruption. In response, Oli attacked Dahal for not letting him the government, promoting factionalism and nepotism as well as not letting victims of the Nepalese Civil War get justice.

=== Vertical split ===
On 20 December 2020, K.P. Sharma Oli called on President Bidhya Devi Bhandari to dissolve the House of Representatives and call for fresh elections. In an address to the nation, Oli said he dissolved the house after the party had not let him work as prime minister and that a no-confidence motion was being prepared against him from within the party. The decision was met with criticism from within the party and seven ministers close to the Dahal–Nepal faction in his cabinet resigned in protest.

K.P. Oli called a meeting of the central committee of the leaders in the party close to him and added 556 members to the existing 446-member committee of the party. The new central committee was to organize a party unity convention in November 2021. The meeting also removed Narayan Kaji Shrestha as party spokesperson and replaced him with Pradeep Gyawali.

The Dahal–Nepal faction of the party also organized its own central committee meeting with 310 members of the original central committee and replaced K.P. Oli as party co-chairman with Madhav Kumar Nepal. The meeting also decided to protest against the government to restore the House of Representatives.

=== Election Commission registry ===
The party was registered with the Election Commission of Nepal on 7 June 2018 under the name Nepal Communist Party (NCP) after the Election Commission of Nepal refused to register the new party under the name "Communist Party of Nepal", as another party led by Rishi Kattel had already been registered under that name. Kattel challenged the Election Commission decision at the Supreme Court.

As a reference to the NCP's registration, the party became colloquially known as the NCP double. Following the split between the Oli and Dahal-Nepal factions, the Election Commission declined to recognize neither faction as the legitimate holders of the NCP's registration. On 8 March 2021, Nepal's Supreme Court stated that the allocation of the name Nepal Communist Party upon the merger of the CPN (UML) and CPN (Maoist Centre), and by extension the merger itself, was void ab initio, as the name was already allotted to the party led by Kattel, and that the NCP stood "dismissed". Upon the ruling, the two predecessor parties were revived in their original state immediately prior to the merger, although should the two wish to merge again with proper procedure being followed, that it would be fully allowed.

== Ideology ==
As part of the original merger agreement, the party's ideology consisted of Marxism–Leninism and support for a multi-party system in Nepal, while the party itself remains officially secular and governed by democratic centralism. The party also favors socialism-oriented people's democracy in the short-term that would eventually lead into communism.

== Organization and structure ==
=== Central organization ===
==== Secretariat ====
A nine-member Secretariat (also known as High Command) of the party was created. It included:

- Chairperson: KP Sharma Oli and Pushpa Kamal Dahal
- General Secretary: Bishnu Prasad Paudel
- Members: Madhav Kumar Nepal, Jhala Nath Khanal, Bam Dev Gautam, Narayan Kaji Shrestha, Ishwor Pokhrel, Ram Bahadur Thapa.

==== Politburo ====
A 135-member politburo was formed after the formation of the standing committee and central committee.

==== Standing Committee ====
The 45-member Standing Committee of the Central Political Bureau included 26 members from CPN (UML) and 19 from CPN (Maoist Centre).

==== Central Committee ====
The central committee had a total of 441 members, including 241 from Communist Party of Nepal (Unified Marxist–Leninist), and 200 from Communist Party of Nepal (Maoist Centre).

=== Lower-level organizations ===
- Provincial committees: 151-member committee for each of the seven provinces
- District committees: 77-member committee for each of the 77 districts
- Metropolitan committees
- Sub-metropolitan committees
- Municipal committees
- Rural municipal committees
- Ward committees

== Federal government ==
| Elections | Pratinidhi Sabha | Rastriya Sabha | Government | Prime Minister/Parliamentary Party Leader |
|---|---|---|---|---|
| 2017 | 174 / 275 | 50 / 59 | Majority government | Khadga Prasad Oli |

== Presence in various provinces ==
| Province | Seats | Percentage |
|---|---|---|
| Province No. 1 | 66 / 93 | 70.97% |
| Madhesh Province | 32 / 107 | 29.91% |
| Bagmati Province | 80 / 110 | 73.64% |
| Gandaki Province | 39 / 60 | 65% |
| Lumbini Province | 61 / 87 | 70.11% |
| Karnali Province | 32 / 40 | 80% |
| Sudurpashchim Province | 39 / 53 | 73.58% |

== Leadership ==
=== Party leadership ===
Chairmen

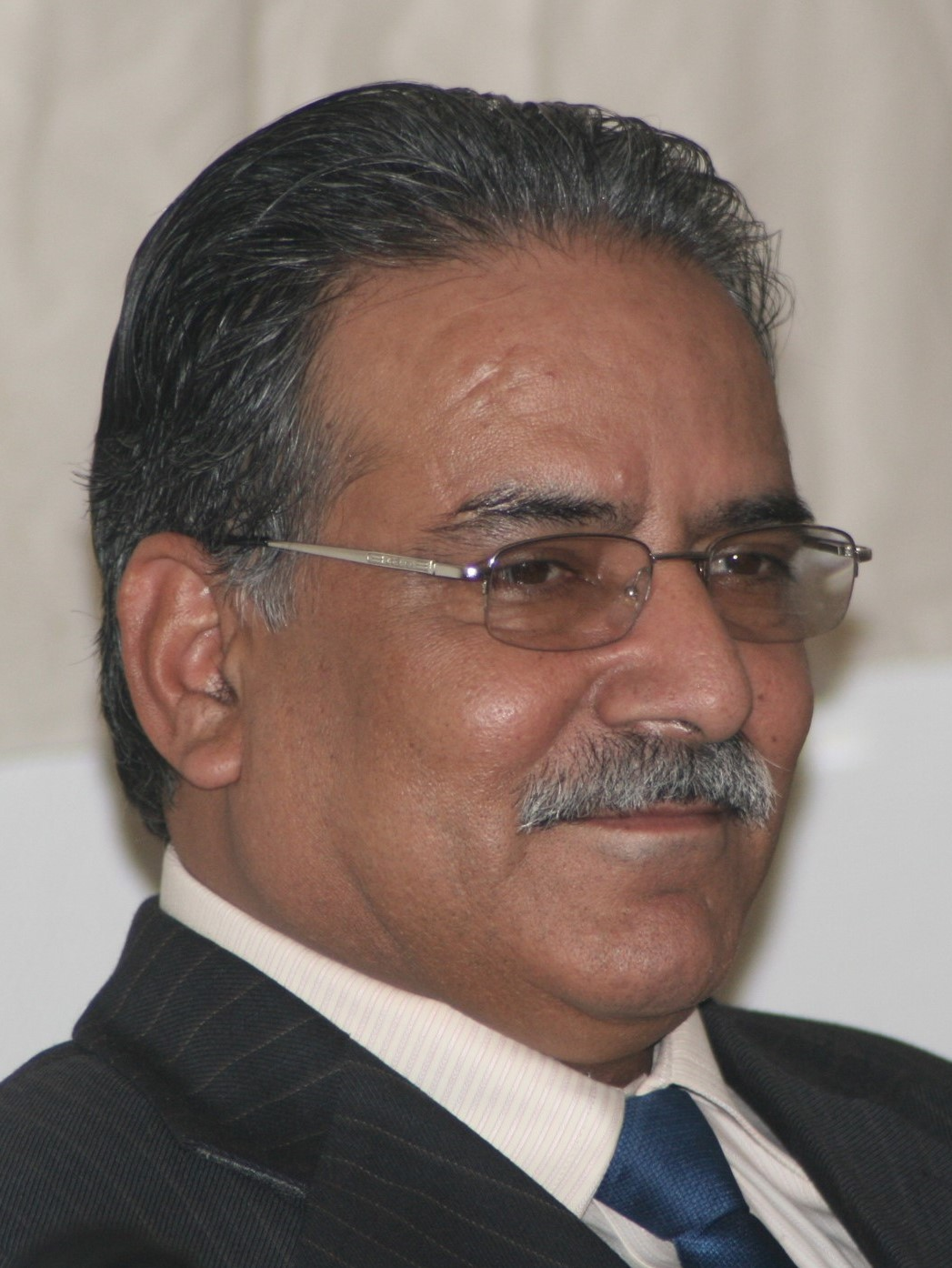
- Pushpa Kamal Dahal, 2018–2021
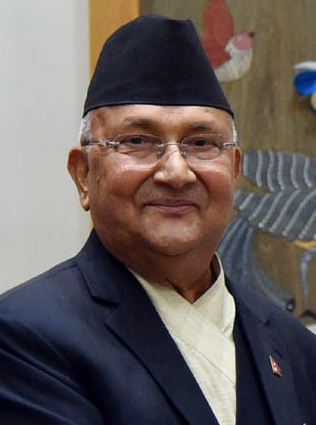
- Khadga Prasad Oli, 2018–2021

Vice-chairmen

- Bam Dev Gautam, 2019–2021

General secretaries

- Bishnu Prasad Paudel, 2018–2021

=== List of prime ministers ===
| No. | Prime Minister | Portrait | Term in office | | | Legislature | Cabinet | Constituency |
| No. | Prime Minister | Portrait | Start | End | Tenure | Legislature | Cabinet | Constituency |
|---|---|---|---|---|---|---|---|---|
| 1 | Khadga Prasad Oli | | 15 February 2018 (Note: Term started before the party was formed on 17 May 2018) | 13 July 2021 (Note: Term ended after the party was dissolved on 8 March 2021) | 3 years, 148 days | 1st Federal Parliament | Oli, 2018 | Jhapa 5 |

=== Provincial governments ===
In 2020, NCP headed the provincial governments in Province No. 1, Bagmati, Gandaki, Lumbini, Karnali and Sudurpahschim provinces.

chief ministers from NCP (before its dissolution)
| Province | Chief Minister | Portrait | Cabinet | Constituency |
|---|---|---|---|---|
| Province No. 1 | Sher Dhan Rai | | Sher Dhan Rai, 2018 | Bhojpur 1(B) |
| Bagmati | Dormani Poudel | | Dormani Poudel, 2018 | Makwanpur 1(B) |
| Gandaki | Prithvi Subba Gurung | | Prithvi Subba Gurung, 2018 | Lamjung 1(B) |
| Lumbini | Shankar Pokharel | | Shankar Pokharel, 2018 | Dang 2(A) |
| Karnali | Mahendra Bahadur Shahi | | Mahendra Bahadur Shahi, 2018 | Kalikot 1(B) |
| Sudurpaschim | Trilochan Bhatta | | Trilochan Bhatta, 2018 | Doti 1(B) |

== Breakaway factions ==
| Party | Leaders |
|---|---|
| CPN (UML) | KP Sharma Oli |
| CPN (Maoist Centre) | Pushpa Kamal Dahal |
| CPN (Unified Socialist) | Madhav Kumar Nepal |
| People's Progressive Party | Hridayesh Tripathi |
| CPN (Unity National Campaign) | Bam Dev Gautam |

== See also ==
- Nepali Communist Party
- 2021 split in Nepal Communist Party
