= Communist Party of Nepal (Marxist–Leninist–Maoist) =

Communist Party of Nepal (Marxist–Leninist–Maoist) नेपाल कम्युनिस्ट पार्टी (मार्क्सवादी–लेनिनवादी–माओवादी)
- Abbreviation: CPN (MLM)
- Founded: 1981 as the Nepal Marxist–Leninist Party
- Dissolved: 2005
- Split from: CPN (Amatya)
- Succeeded by: CPN (Marxist–Leninist–Maoist Centre)
- Ideology: Communism; Marxism–Leninism
- Political position: Far-left

The Communist Party of Nepal (Marxist–Leninist–Maoist), abbreviated CPN (MLM), was a minor communist party in Nepal. The party was as founded in 1981 by Krishna Das Shrestha. Initially known as the Nepal Marxist-Leninist Party, Shrestha had broken away from the Bagmati District Committee, which functioned semiautonomously, of the Communist Party of Nepal in 1969. Krishna Das Shrestha was the party president.

During the 1990 popular uprising against the monarchy, the group formed part of the radical United National People's Movement. In 1991, the party was one of the organizations that founded the Samyukta Jana Morcha but left it following the election.

CPN (MLM) took part in the Joint People's Agitation Committee, which had called for a general strike on 6 April 1992. Violence erupted in the capital during the strike, and according to the human rights NGO HURON 14 people were killed in police firing. Ahead of the 1992 elections to local bodies, CPN (MLM) took part in forming a front together with the Samyukta Jana Morcha, Nepal Workers Peasants Party, Communist Party of Nepal (15 September 1949) and Nepal Communist League.

In 1996, CPN (MLM) denounced the Mahakali Treaty between India and Nepal. In the parliamentary elections in 1999, CPN (MLM) had put up three candidates. CPN (MLM) later joined the United Left Front, which demands a Constitutional Assembly as the solution to the political crisis. In 2005, CPN (MLM) merged with a splinter group, Nepal Samyabadi Party (Marksbadi-Leninbadi-Maobadi) of Nanda Kumar Prasai, and formed the Communist Party of Nepal (Marxist-Leninist-Maoist Centre). In 2009, CPN (MLM) merged with the Communist Party of Nepal (Maoist).

== See also ==
- List of communist parties in Nepal
