= Communist Party of Nepal (United) (1991–2005) =

Communist Party of Nepal (United) नेपाल कम्युनिस्ट पार्टी (संयुक्त)
- Founded: 1991
- Dissolved: 2005
- Merger of: CPN (Amatya); CPN (Burma); CPN (Democratic)
- Succeeded by: CPN (United Marxist)
- Ideology: Communism; Marxism–Leninism

Communist Party of Nepal (United) was a political party in Nepal. In 1991, after the first general election, through the merger of Communist Party of Nepal (Democratic), Communist Party of Nepal (Burma) and Communist Party of Nepal (Amatya). Both the Burma and Amatya-led factions did however break away from the party soon after the merger. The youth wing of the party was called Nepal National Youth Federation. Its trade union wing was called Nepal Trade Union Federation.

== History ==
The general secretary of CPN (United) was Bishnu Bahadur Manandhar and the deputy general secretary Ganesh Shah.

Following the February 1, 2005 royal take-over in Nepal, both Manandhar and Shah were arrested. In 2005 the party merged with the Communist Party of Nepal (Marxist) and formed the Communist Party of Nepal (United Marxist).

== Electoral performance ==
Election	Leader	Votes		Seats	Position	Resulting government
Election	Leader	#	%	#	Position	Resulting government
1994	Bishnu Bahadur Manandhar	29,273	0.38	0 / 205	10th	CPN (UML)
1999	Bishnu Bahadur Manandhar	4,715	0.05	0 / 205	18th	Congress

== See also ==
- List of communist parties in Nepal
