= Ganesh Shah =

Nepalese politician

Ganesh Shah गणेश शाह
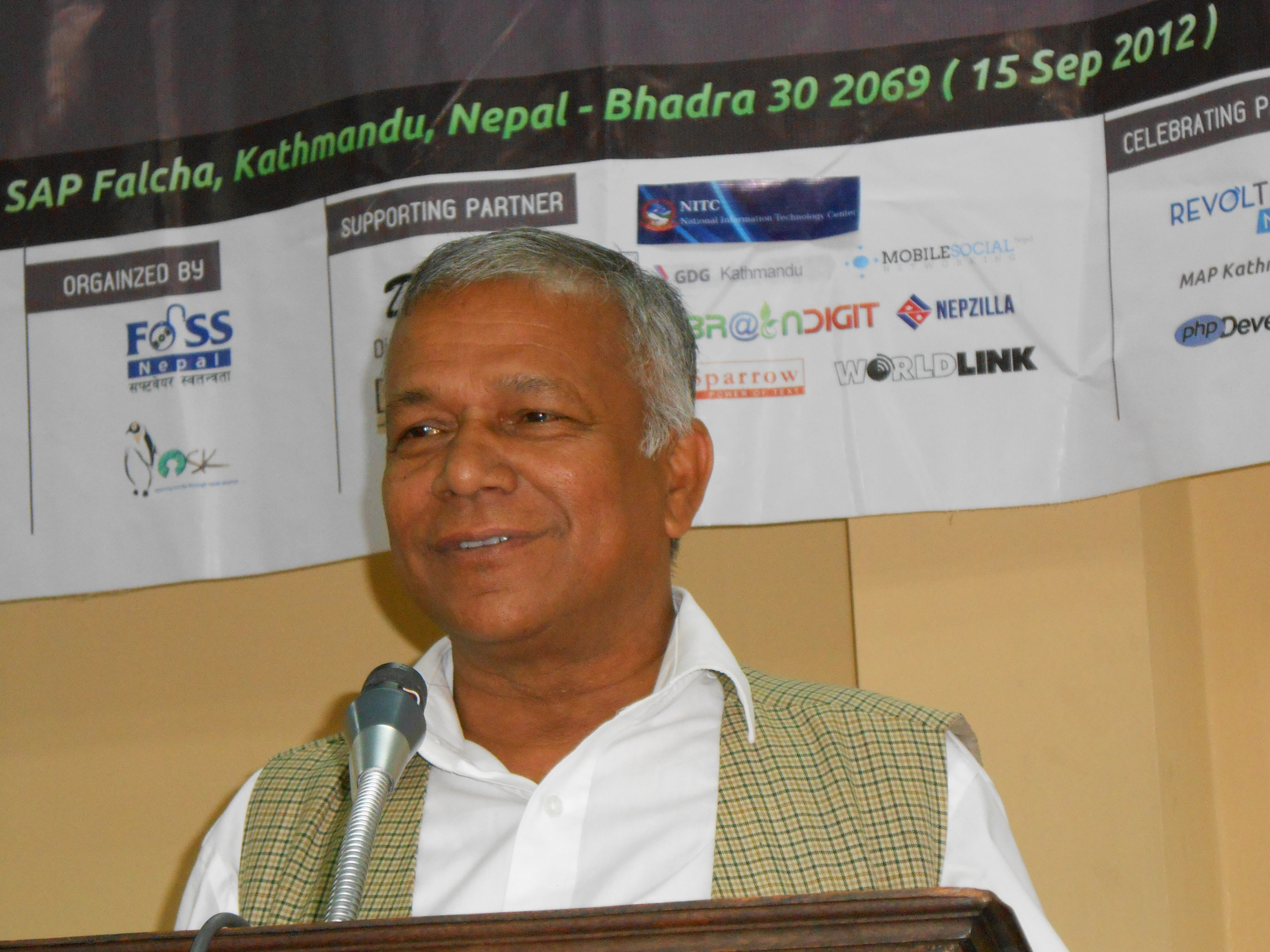
- Ganesh Shah in Software Freedom Day 2012
- Born: 12 December 1949 (age 76); Nepal
- Occupation: Politician
- Years active: 2002-present
- Spouse: Kalyanee Sapkota

Ganesh Shah (Nepali: गणेश शाह born 12 December 1949) is a Nepalese politician and ex-Minister for Environment, Science and Technology. He is also one of the senior most leader of the Communist Party of Nepal (United) and until recently was the General Secretary of the party Communist Party of Nepal (United).

Shah is a chemical engineer by profession and received his M-Tech (Technical Engineering) from Patrice Lumumba Peoples' Friendship University in 1973.

Shah was appointed the Minister for Environment, Science and Technology when Prachanda extended his cabinet. Mr. Shah is a big advocate of the climate change issues in Nepal and has been quoted in various media outlet during his time as a minister. Mr. Shah is known for being one of the technology savvy politician in Nepal maintains his own blog at and is an active Facebook user.

== Family life ==
Shah was born in Lohana Dhanusha. He belongs to Nepali people of Madhesi (business caste)ethnicity.

He is married to Kalyanee Sapkota, and has two sons.
