= Eknath Ranabhat =

Nepali politician

- एकनाथ रानाभाट

Member of Parliament, Pratinidhi Sabha
- In office 1999–2002
- Monarch: Birendra
- Prime Minister: Krishna Prasad Bhattarai Girija Prasad Koirala Sher Bahadur Deuba

Personal details
- Born: 13 November 1952
- Died: 22 February 2021 (aged 68)
- Party: Nepali Congress

Eknath Ranabhat (Nepali: एकनाथ रानाभाट; 13 November 1952 - 22 February 2021) was a Nepalese politician. He was elected to the Pratinidhi Sabha in the 1999 election on behalf of the Nepali Congress.
