= 2006 Nepalese revolution =

Political anti-monarchy movement

2006 Nepal Revolution
- Part of Nepalese democracy movement
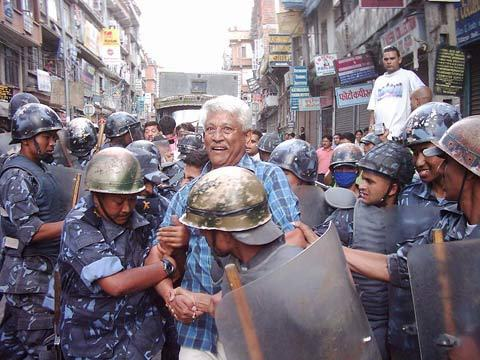
- King Gyanendra arrested prominent leaders including the Nepali Congress spokesperson Arjun Narasingha K.C.—shown above being taken to the central jail.
- Date: 4 – 24 April 2006
- Location: Nepal
- Caused by: 2005 coup d'état by King
- Goals: Restoration of the parliament; Abolition of monarchy
- Result: Restoration of the parliament; Formation of the interim legislature of Nepal; Establishment of Nepal as a federal democratic republic

Parties
Government of Nepal	(Nepal) Protestors: Seven Party Alliance; Nepali Congress; Communist Party of Nepal (Unified Marxist–Leninist); Nepali Congress (Democratic); Nepal Workers Peasants Party; Nepal Sadbhavana Party; United Left Front (Nepal, 2002); Janamorcha Nepal

Casualties and losses
None	25

The 2006 Nepal revolution, also known as the Democracy Movement (Nepali: लोकतन्त्र आन्दोलन, romanized: Loktantra Āndolan Jana Andolan II), was a political movement in Nepal opposed to the authoritarian, absolutist form of monarchy adopted by King Gyanendra of Nepal. The movement was the second protest against the monarchy, following the first revolution.

== Reinstitution of Parliament ==
In a nationally televised address, King Gyanendra reinstated the old Nepal House of Representatives on April 24, 2006. The King called upon the Seven Party Alliance (SPA) to bear the responsibility of taking the nation on the path to national unity and prosperity while ensuring permanent peace and safeguarding multiparty democracy.

The reinstitution of Parliament was accepted by the SPA. It declared that Girija Prasad Koirala would lead the new government. The SPA stated that the new parliament will hold elections for a body that would write a new constitution.

The move was rejected by the Maoists. Maoist leader Baburam Bhattarai stated that merely restoring the parliament was not going to resolve the problems and that the rebels planned to continue fighting against government forces. They still demanded the formation of a Constituent Assembly and abolition of the monarchy.

On April 28, however, the Maoist insurgents responded to demands by Girija Prasad Koirala and announced a unilateral three-month truce in the Nepalese Civil War. In addition to this, on May 1, Bhattarai announced that if "the elections [to a Constituent Assembly] are free and fair, one has to respect the result of the elections. Then of course we will abide by the verdict of the people." This was seen as a large step forward as it shows the first signs of Maoist acceptance of the democratic process.

On May 2, Koirala announced the new government cabinet including himself and three other ministers from the Nepali Congress: K.P. Sharma Oli from CPN (UML), Gopal Man Shrestha from Nepali Congress (Democratic) and Prabhu Narayan Chaudhari from the United Left Front. This was followed on May 12 by the arrest of four ministers from the ousted royalist government and an investigation into alleged human rights violations by the army during the General Strike.

=== May 18 Act ===
The most dramatic move of the post-Revolution government came on May 18, 2006, when the Parliament unanimously voted to strip the King of many of his powers. The bill included:

- Putting 90,000 troops in the hands of the parliament
- Imposing a tax on the royal family and its assets
- Ending the Raj Parishad, a royal advisory council
- Eliminating royal references from army and government titles
- Declaring Nepal a secular country, not a Hindu kingdom
- Scrapping the national anthem until a new one is composed
- Eliminating the king's position as the Supreme Commander of the Army

The act overrides the 1990 Constitution, written up following the 1990 revolution and has been described as a Nepalese Magna Carta. According to Prime Minister Koirala, "This proclamation represents the feelings of all the people."

May 18 has already been named Loktantrik Day (Democracy Day) by some.

Although the constitution was accepted, it was always intended to be temporary and on May 29, 2008, a new constitution was voted on by the Nepalese Parliament, which declared that the monarchy would be deposed and a new parliamentary republic would become the Nepalese political framework.

== See also ==
- 1990 People's Movement
- 2020–2021 Nepalese protests
- 2025 Nepalese Gen Z protests
- Nepalese Civil War
- Office of Nepal Trust
