= Communist Party of Nepal (Marxist) (1991–2005) =

Communist Party of Nepal (Marxist) नेपाल कम्युनिष्ट पार्टी (मार्क्सवादी)
- Founded: 1991
- Dissolved: 2005
- Split from: CPN (Marxist)
- Succeeded by: CPN (United Marxist)
- Ideology: Communism; Marxism–Leninism
- Political position: Far-left

The Communist Party of Nepal (Marxist) was a Nepalese political party. It was formed on 1 November 1991 by a group of former leaders of the original Communist Party of Nepal (Marxist) that had been expelled from the Communist Party of Nepal (Unified Marxist–Leninist). Initially, it was known as the Communist Party of Nepal (15 September 1949) but took the name Communist Party of Nepal (Marxist) after approximately one year of existence. Prabhunaryan Chaudhary was the chairman of the party.

== History ==
Ahead of the 1992 Nepalese local elections, the CPN (15 September 1949) took part in forming a front together with the Samyukta Janamorcha Nepal, Nepal Workers Peasants Party, Communist Party of Nepal (Marxist–Leninist–Maoist), and Nepal Communist League.

In the 1994 Nepalese general election, it had 49 candidates and polled 0.39% of the votes nationwide. In the 1999 Nepalese general election, it had 28 candidates, and got 0.094% of the votes nationwide. The students wing of the party was called Nepal Progressive Students Union and its trade union was the Nepal Trade Union Centre (NTUC). On 6 April, a major chunk of its membership (5.153) joined the CPN (UML).

In 2005, the party merged with the Communist Party of Nepal (United) and formed the Communist Party of Nepal (United Marxist).

== Electoral performance ==
Election	Leader	Votes		Seats	Position	Resulting government
Election	Leader	No.	%	No.	Position	Resulting government
1994	Prabhunaryan Chaudhary	29,571	0.39	0 / 205	9th	Extra-parliamentary
1999	Prabhunaryan Chaudhary	7,654	0.09	0 / 205	13th	Extra-parliamentary

== See also ==
- History of Nepal
- List of communist parties in Nepal
- Politics of Nepal
