= Communist Party of Nepal (United) =

Communist Party of Nepal (United) नेपाल कम्यूनिष्ट पार्टी (संयुक्त)
- Leader: Chandra Dev Joshi
- President: Ghanashyam Bhusal
- Founded: 2007
- Merger of: Unified Socialist; CPN (United)
- Ideology: Communism; Marxism-Leninism
- Political position: Left-wing
- Seats in Bagmati Provincial Assembly: 1 / 107
- Seats in Sudurpashchim Provincial Assembly: 1 / 53

Election symbol

Communist Party of Nepal (United) (Nepali: नेपाल कम्यूनिष्ट पार्टी (संयुक्त)) is a political party in Nepal. It was founded in 2007, following a split in the Communist Party of Nepal (United Marxist). Ghanashyam Bhusal serves as chairman while senior communist politician Chandra Dev Joshi remains the senior leader of the party.

In 2008 Nepal's first openly homosexual representative, Sunil Babu Pant was elected to the Constituent Assembly from the party list. The party crossed threshold votes to be representative in both constituent assembly elections.

== History ==
The party was founded following a split in the Communist Party of Nepal (United Marxist) when Ganesh Shah and Chandra Dev Joshi broke away from the party. In the 2008 Constituent Assembly elections, the party won five seats from proportional voting. The party selected Sunil Babu Pant, the first openly homosexual lawmaker in Asia from the party list. Party chairman Chandra Dev Joshi was also appointed as the Minister for Land Reform and Management in the Baburam Bhattari cabinet in 2011.

In the 2013 Constituent Assembly elections the party won three seats from proportional voting. The party was reformed in 2025 when Ghanashyam Bhusal led team which didn't join formation of Nepali Communist Party alleging the formation as elderly club, joined the party and party chair Joshi handed over party to them. The Bhusal led group contained former ministers Jeevan Ram Shrestha, Bhawani Prasad Khapung, Urbadutta Pant, Laxman Lamsal, etc.

== Electoral performance ==
Election	Leader	Votes		Seats		Position	Resulting government
Election	Leader	#	%	#	+/-	Position	Resulting government
2008	Chandra Dev Joshi	154,968	1.44	5 / 575		10th	Maoist–CPN (UML)–MJFN–Sadbhavana–CPN (United)
2013	Chandra Dev Joshi	91,997	0.97	3 / 575	▼2	▼13th	Congress–CPN (UML)–RPP

== See also ==
- Politics of Nepal
- List of communist parties in Nepal
