= Magarat =

Place settled and inhabited by Magars

Magarat is a name for the area settled and inhabited by Magars, the largest and one of the oldest indigenous ethnic groups of Nepal. It is a geographical cluster in Nepal that existed in the modern territory of Nepal before the Unification of Nepal. It extended westward from the Budhi Gandaki River and encompasses mordern-day districts like Palpa, Rukum, Rolpa, Myagdi, Parbat, Baglung, Pyuthan, Nawalpur, Tanahun, Gulmi, Syangja, Arghakhanchi, and many more.

Palpa, Eastern Rukum and Rolpa (majority of Kham Magars), located in Lumbini Province of Nepal, are the top three districts with the highest indigenous Magar population, with significant populations also in districts like Myagdi, Baglung, Parbat, Nawalpur, Tanahun, and Syangja, all of which are located in Gandaki Province in West-Central Nepal.

== Magars ==
Magars are divided into eight major clans: Thapa, Pun, Rana, Ale, Gharti, Roka, Budha/ Budhathoki, and Chitory/Chitaurey. Each of theses clans is further broken down into many smaller sub-clans (lineages).

Magars are martial people who first established their kingdom in present-day western Nepal. They were animistic and shamanic. The Kham Magar of the upper Karnali basin and the western mid-hills maintained a flourishing kingdom, with archaeological proof still found today. Magars have long held significant roles in various temples; for instance, Magars are the Main Priests of Manakamana (an important Hindu temple) in Gorkha—a temple closely tied to Nepal's Shah dynasty—according to this temple's tradition, only a direct descendant of Saint Lakhan Thapa Magarcan serve as the main priest—a hereditary practice that has continued for centuries. Similarly, Kalika—the goddess protecting the kingdoms of Lamjung and Gorkha—has also drawn her main priests from the Bohara Magar clan.Magars (Maski Rana Magar) are also the Main Priests of Alamdevi Temple—Shah Kings' ancestral deity (Kul Devta) in Syangja. Magars have been in charge of the religious functions linked to the source of Thakuri power.The Magar have a strong warrior tradition, yet their hospitality and concern for others are legendary.

The Purano Gorakh Battalion (meaning 'Old Gorakh') was originally a Magar regiment that played a foundation role in the history and formation of the Gurkha Army. The name 'Purano Gorakh' reflects its origins in the Gorkha region—the birthplace of Gurkha.

Magars are known for their honesty and unwavering tenacity, most notably evidenced by their service in the Gurkha regiments where they have earned numerous Victoria Crosses for bravery.

During WW1 and WW2, five of the 13 Victoria Crosses awarded to Gurkhas were earned by Magars: Kulbir Thapa—first Gurkha VC recipient in 1915—followed by Karanbahadur Rana, Lalbahadur Thapa, Tul Bahadur Pun, and Netrabahadur Thapa. More recently, Dipprasad Pun became the first and only Gurkha to receive the Conspicuous Gallantry Cross.

== Aramudi ==
Aramudi is a name of a King, a powerful ruler in the Kali Gandaki region, and a legend in the 8th century Himalayan history, particularly of Kashmir and Nepal. In a war between King Aramudi and Kashmir (King Jayapida), the Kashmir king was defeated and imprisoned in a fortress built above the bank of Kali Gandaki river is called Kalhana aśma-veśman " (stone house) in present Gulmi district. Aramudi was also called king Baradev of ancient Nepal. Lalitpattan, presently Lalitpur, was his capital.

=== Etymology ===
Aramudi sounds like an indigenous Magar name with ‘di’ suggesting – ‘water’ or ‘river’. The four morphemes or segments ‘a’ + ‘ra’ + ‘mu’ + di’ or ‘mo + di’. Conjugating these morphemes produces either “aramu + di” or “ara’ + ‘mudi or modi”. In Magar ‘aramu’ or ‘armu’ means ‘sweet smell’ and ‘di’ means ‘water’ - hence literally “aramu + di” means ‘sweet smelling water’ or ‘sweet tasting spring water', in Nepali ‘jharanako mitho pani’. The ‘di’ in ‘Aramudi’ is suggestive of ‘water’ in Magar. In the Kali Gandaki region and western Nepal, rivers, small streams, towns and villages retain their Magar language names. Examples include Marshyang+di river in Tanahu, ‘Lang+di’, ‘Darang+di’; ’Lun+di’ in Gorkha, ‘Hosrang+di’ village in Parbat, Chhang+di in Tanahu, ‘Argaun+di’ village, ‘Hug+di’ in Plapa, Mudi village in Myagdi district. During the period of Magarat ( Confideration of 12 Magarat & 18 Magarat ) In the kingdom called Palpa the King was ‘ Mukunda Sen Magar” in Naradsmriti Granth. He waged a war against Nepal (Kathmandu Valley) twice in 1521 Bikram Era and on Chaitra 11,1522 BE.

== Dalsur Magar of Liglig (Gorkha) ==
King Dalsur Ghale Magar 1548-1559, (Ghale a sub-clan of Thapa Magar clan's) was the Magar King of Ligligkot, which was historically a Magar Principality that was later captured by Dravya Shah and became the foundation for the Kingdom of Gorkha.

Gangaram Rana Magar also helped Dravya Shah defeat Magars King Daslur Ghale Magar to seize the throne of Ligligkot and supported Dravya Shah claim to the throne in 1559 CE.

== Mansingh Khadka Magar ==
Mansingh Khadka Magar was a king of Majhakot and Uppalokot in Gorkha until 1559. At an annual running event called Liglig Daud, the winner was chosen King Of Ligligkot Kingdom Dravya Shah (youngest son Of Yashobrahma) was invited to take over the throne by the Brahmins, in particular Bhagirath Panth and Ganesh Pande. On the 8th of Bhadon Badi, Saka 1481 (A.D. 1559) Dravya Shah was aided by Bhagirath Panth, Ganesa Pande, Busal Arjyal, Khanal Bohra, Murli Khawas and Gangaram Rana Magar of Liglig-kot. Ganesa Pande had collected all the people of Gurkha, such as the Thapas, Busals, Ranas and Maski Ranas of the Magar tribe, they went by the Dahya Gauda route and attacked the Durbar and defeated the Khadka Raja (Khadka a sub-clan of Rana Magar clan's). As Dravya Shah took his seat on the gaddi (throne) and named the new Gorkha Kingdom, Dravya Shah used the army of the Khas, Thakuri and Magars to invade neighboring states. His successors continued this aggression to increase the territory belonging to Gorkha.

== Gorkha Kingdom ==
After the Magar rulers of Ligligkot and Gorkha principalities —once part of the Magarat region— were defeated, Magar military figures became key allies and generals in the Gorkha kingdom. The Magar were a dominant force in the central and western mid-hills of Nepal, and these Magar military figures played a significant role in its expansion that eventually united Nepal. The founder of modern Nepal, King Prithvi Narayan Shah, considered himself "the King of Magarat" and had strong ties to the Magar community.

During King Prithvi Narayan Shah's reign, Magars held high military and government positions (Kaji) in the royal court, including one of the six courtiers—Cha-ThaGhar (Six Nobles Houses)—and were among the ruling elite of the Gorkha Kingdom (e.g., Kaji Jayant Rana Magar, among others).

Surati Singh Rana Magar was King Prithvi Narayan Shah's maternal uncle and personal assistant, who looked after him during his childhood. The King referred to him as Magar Dada.

Even before King Prithvi Narayan Shah's reign and thereafter, the Magars were a powerful group in the Gorkha Kingdom. Biraj Thapa Magar, the first chief of the Gorkhali Army (a kingmaker), was an important Gorkha Bhardar who helped Nara Bhupal Shah become King of Gorkha. Sarbajit Rana Magar was a Mulkaji, and Bandu Rana and Deva Dutta Thapa were also Magar Kajis.

== Magars in the Civil War (1996–2006) ==
During the Nepalese Civil War, the Magar community played a key role, providing the backbone of the Maoist People's Liberation Army (PLA). Key leaders from Rolpa—the Maoist heartland of Magar villages—Barsaman Pun (one of the four Core Deputy Commanders) and former Chief Commander Nanda Kishor Pun (Pasang) were the top senior PLA Commanders throughout the conflict, alongside Ganesh Man Pun (Rashmi) of Rukum, who served as a prominent rebel political commissar and 4th Division Commander, and Dipendra Pun Magar (Sijal) from Rolpa, a high-ranking wartime Politburo member who served as a PLA Brigade Commissioner and Commander. Additionally, a former King's trusted minister, Narayan Singh Pun from Myagdi, served as the royal government's Chief Negotiator and played a vital role in peace negotiations.

Since the conflict ended, Magar leaders have held prominent positions: Nanda Kishor Pun became the Vice President of Nepal, female leader Onsari Gharti Magar from Rolpa served as the first female Speaker of Parliament. In the post-war transition, Ganesh Man Pun served as the founding YCL chairman and later entered the cabinet as the Minister for Commerce and Supplies, while other key figures like Barsaman Pun, Ram Bahadur Thapa (from Gulmi), and Balaram Gharti Magar held top ministerial roles. Meanwhile, Dipendra Pun Magar served as the district chief of Rolpa and became the Minister for Health for Lumbini Province. Other influential leaders include Suresh Ale Magar (Tanahun), Lokendra Bista Magar (West Rukum), Bina Magar (Kanchanpur), and Kamala Roka & Purna Bahadur Gharti Magar (East Rukum). While these leaders come from different districts, many emerged from the core area of the Maoist-declared Magarat Autonomous Region.

Kingdoms such as Rishing, Ghiring, Argha, Khachhi, Gulmi, Dhor, Satung, Paiung, Bhirkot, Gharung Mishikot, Isma were collectively known as Barha Magarat (12 Magarat) or Confederation of Twelve Magar Kingdoms and were ruled by Magar Kings.

The annual festival of Barhakune Tal in Ghorahi of Dang district commemorates the founding of Twelve Magarats Confederation of Twelve Magar Kingdoms. Similarly Athara Magarat (18 Magarat) or Confederation of Eighteen Magar Kingdoms was located west of Kali Gandaki, primarily inhabited by Kham Magars.
