= Inspector General of the Armed Police Force =

Highest APF rank in Nepal

- सशस्त्र प्रहरी महानिरीक्षक
- Incumbent; Narayan Datta Paudel since 2 May 2026
- Reports to: Home Ministry of Nepal
- Residence: IGP Residence, Halchowk, Kathmandu
- Seat: Nepal Police Headquarters, Halchowk, Kathmandu, Nepal
- Appointer: Subject to the decision of the Prime Minister and the Council of Ministers of Nepal
- Term length: 4 years; Extendable
- Constituting instrument: Armed Police Force Act, 2001
- Formation: 2001
- First holder: Krishna Mohan Shrestha
- Deputy: Additional Inspector General of Armed Police Force (AIG, APF)
- Website: www.apf.gov.np

The Inspector General of the Armed Police Force (IG of APF) is the senior-most and highest-ranked officer and the head of the Armed Police Force, who oversees all police activities throughout the country and reports directly to the Ministry of Home Affairs and is appointed by the government of Nepal for a tenure of four years.

== List of Nepal's IGs ==
Order	Name	Time in office
1st	Krishna Mohan Shrestha	1 February 2001 – 26 January 2003
2nd	Sahabir Thapa	27 January 2003 – 11 May 2006
3rd	Basudev Oli	12 May 2006 – 15 April 2009
4th	Sanat Kumar Basnet	15 April 2009 – 5 June 2011
5th	Kishor Kumar Lama	17 July 2011 – 30 July 2011
6th	Shailendra Kumar Shrestha	31 July 2011 – 10 April 2012
7th	Kosh Raj Onta	11 April 2012 – 18 December 2015
8th	Durja Kumar Rai	18 December 2015 – 23 February 2017
9th	Singha Bahadur Shrestha	24 February 2017 – 11 April 2018
10th	Shailendra Khanal	12 April 2018 – 11 April 2022
11th	Pushpa Ram K.C.	12 April 2022 – 19 May 2022
12th	Raju Aryal	20 May 2022 – 1 May 2026
13th	Narayan Datta Paudel	2 May 2026 – incumbent
