= Second Battle of Khara =

Battle of the Nepalese Civil War

- Part of the Nepalese Civil War
| Date | 7–8 April 2005 |
| Location | Khara, Rukum 28°33′42″N 82°24′29″E |
| Result | Royal Nepalese Army victory |

Belligerents
| Government of Nepal; Royal Nepalese Army; Kha Company, Shree Bhairavi Dal Battalion; 11th Brigade; Nepal Police | People's Liberation Army; Western Division; Central Division |

Commanders and leaders
| Pyar Jung Thapa; Maj. Hari Babu Bogati | Pushpa Kamal Dahal; Nanda Kishor Pun; Janardan Sharma; Krishna Bahadur Mahara |

Strength
| approx. 166 troops including 25 Nepal Police personnel under unified command | approx. 6,000 insurgents |

Casualties and losses
| 3 killed | approx. 300 killed |

The Second Battle of Khara was fought on 7–8 April 2005 at an army base located in Khara, Rukum. It was a major battle of the Nepalese Civil War. The Royal Nepalese Army managed to successfully repulse the attack with minimal losses while the People's Liberation Army suffered heavy casualties.

== Background ==
The August 2004 Central Committee meeting held in Phuntibang, Rolpa had exposed intra-party confrontation between Prachanda and his second in command Baburam Bhattarai. On 1 February 2005, King Gyanendra dismissed the government led by Sher Bahadur Deuba and announced the formation of a new government under his own leadership. Prachanda wanted to attack the base located within their stronghold to reverse a series of losses suffered at the hands of the state forces and to prove within the party that there was a way forward militarily and approved the attack through the central committee.

== Location ==
The army base in Khara was located on a hilltop in south-west Rukum, a district which was regarded as a part of Maoist heartland. It lay at an aerial distance of about 16 km from the district headquarter, Musikot. It had been attacked earlier on 27 May 2002 and was repulsed by the First Rifle Battalion of Royal Nepalese Army with over 150 insurgents killed.

== Battle ==
The Central Command of the PLA, under the leadership of Pasang, was given primary responsibility for the attack whereas the Western Command was to act in a supporting capacity. The Bhairavi Dal Battalion headquarters in Musikot had received intelligence of rebel concentration in its AOR in late May and had passed this information along to the Company in Khara. The Company confirmed from local sources at 15:30 April 7 that its post would be attacked.

An observation post sent from the base made first contact with the rebels at 18:00 with mortar fire from both sides resuming thereafter. The base was surrounded by minefields and barbed-wire obstacles which the rebels the assault forces could not overcome. At 01:00 April 8, the rebels managed to breach the wire obstacle at the western gate by building trenches, but could not advance any further after short range fire and grenade attacks from the army.

The army was supported by machine gun fire and bombs from helicopters at 3 instances between 00:30 and 04:30 April 8. There was intermittent firing till 10:00 when the Maoists retreated recovering their killed and wounded.

The Maoists finally retreated with heavy loss and casualties after the reinforcement of Rangers from Mahabir Battalion at 13:00. There was lack of coordination among the rebels with reports of rebels of Western Command, under the leadership of Prabhakar still digging trenches while the main assault group had already retreated.

== Aftermath ==
The People's Liberation Army suffered further losses during their retreat in an encounter at Dalphing with 65 killed. Earlier losses suffered in Ganeshpur Bardia, Pandaun Kailali, etc. compounded with the heavy loss suffered by the rebels in Khara caused the Maoist's to join hands with the political parties. This decision was endorsed by the Chunbang Central Committee Meeting in October 2005 which led to the 12 point agreement in Delhi with the agitating political parties in November 2005.
