= 2002 Achham incident =

Maoist attack against Nepalese soldiers during the Nepalese Civil War

- Part of Nepalese Civil War
Date	16 February 2002
Location	Mangalsen and Sanphebagar in Achham district, Nepal 29°7′48″N 81°12′36″E
Result	Rebel victory

Belligerents
Kingdom of Nepal: Nepalese Armed Forces; Nepal Police	Communist Party of Nepal (Maoist Centre): People's Liberation Army, Nepal

Strength
Unknown	2,500

Casualties and losses
57 soldiers, 77 policemen and five civilians	Unknown

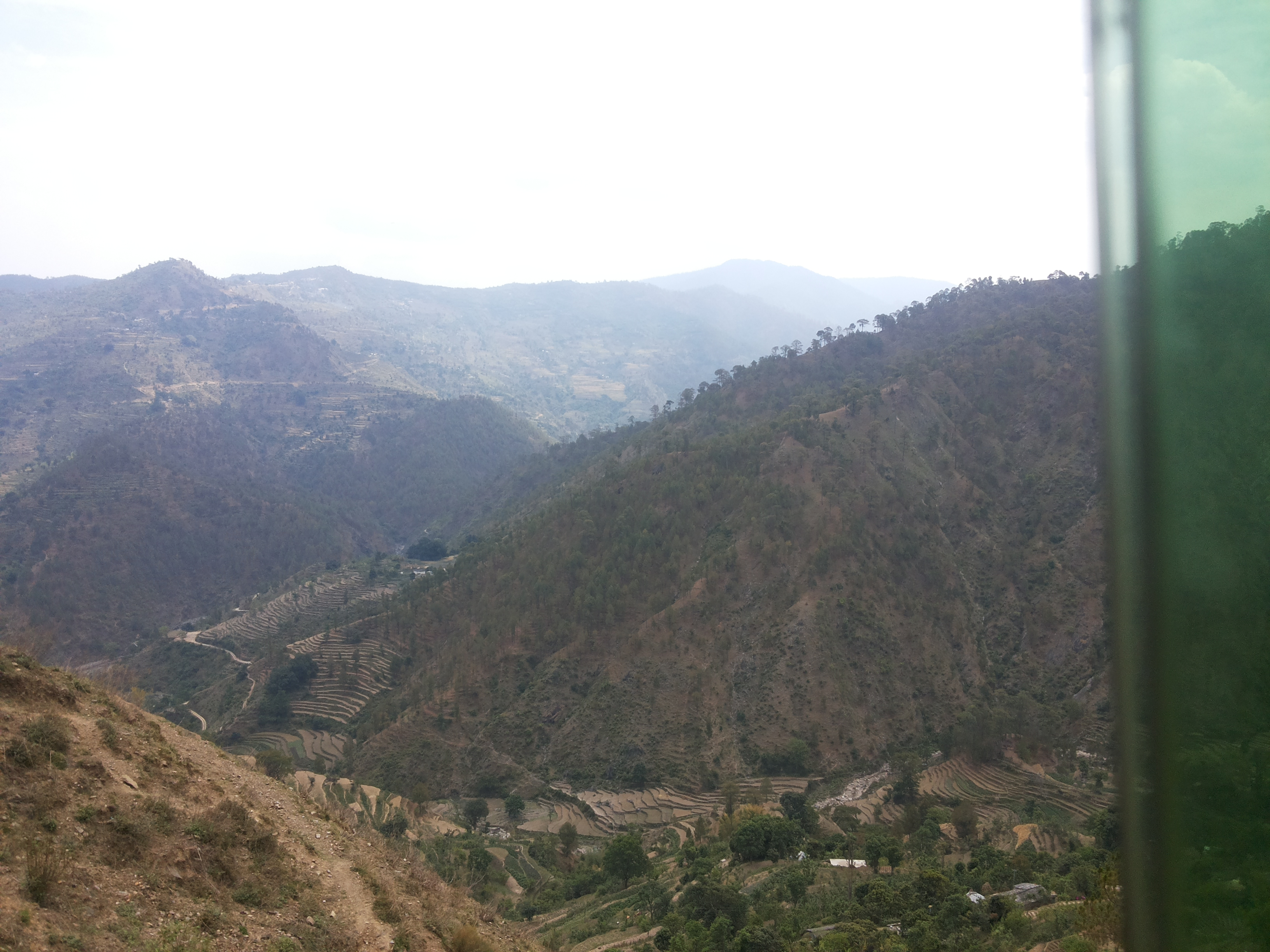
Mangalsen

About 2,500 Maoist guerillas perpetrated a massive attack against the Nepal army in Mangalsen and Sanphebagar in Achham district on 16 February 2002 killing 57 soldiers, 77 policemen and five civilians. Several government buildings were put on fire and an airport at Sanphebagar was destroyed. The incident is considered the single most damaging strike by the rebels during the Nepalese Civil War.

== Background ==
During the civil war, the Maoists negotiated briefly with the government to start the peace process, but the truce collapsed. Nepal's government had enforced a state of emergency for security reasons to contain the war. The period of emergency was about to end when the Mangalsen attack was done. It was done five days prior to deciding to continue the state of emergency.

== Attack in Mangalsen ==
Mangalsen town lies in western part of Nepal. During the civil war, western Nepal was the centre of war and the expectation was that a major incident would occur. In 2002, the main attack occurred. For the attack, the Maoist rebels gradually gathered around the town for two weeks. They had to gather in small groups of 10 to 15 to prevent suspicion from the government security forces. However, the Maoists had distributed pamphlets, pasted posters and organised warning rallies indicating they would attack the district headquarters soon. They also wrote threatening letters to the district administration. This information was sent to Kathmandu by the Chief District Officer, but additional reinforcement was not provided by the central government. The district officer was among the dead in the attack later.

On midnight of 16 February 2002, the actual attack was made. First, the military barracks that had been located at the top spur of Mangalsen town were attacked. About 2,500 Maoists were involved in the attack.

The rebels made five explosions and used automatic weapons and rockets. The first explosion was made at the top of the town, where the military barracks were located. Later, more blasts and gunfire were heard along with slogans chanting Maoists. The battle occurred for about half an hour. Police and soldiers fired back at the rebels, but the forces were outnumbered by the rebels. 57 soldiers out of 59 were killed. Among the dead soldiers, 20 had bullet wounds in the head. One soldier lost his hand as he tried picking up a thrown grenade to throw back towards the Maoists. He was assumed dead by the Maoists, so he survived. The Maoists looted 55 automatic weapons and five machine guns from the Mangalsen barrack.

Next, the Maoists stormed Mangalsen town to attack government facilities. They forced the residents of government buildings out and set the buildings on fire. The district police chief ordered his forces into position and called the army barracks for help but no one replied. Later the phone went disconnected because the telecom tower was also destroyed.

A hydropower plant at Kailash River was destroyed.

A jail housing Maoist inmates were attacked, and the inmates were released. They also raided a bank, stealing 20 million rupees (about $300,000).

The number of rebel casualties remains unknown.

== Attack in Sanphebagar ==
Another simultaneous attack was carried out at Sanphebagar 20 km north of Mangalsen a few hours later on the same day. The Maoists destroyed Sanphebagar Airport and killed 27 policemen. The policemen were overwhelmed by the Maoists' number and better weapons. The Maoist used automatic rifles, mortars and rocket-propelled grenades that they stole during the Ghorahi raid on 23 November 2001.

== Aftermath ==
After the incident, government troops from Kathmandu were sent by helicopter to surround the area and search for the rebels. Sher Bahadur Deuba, the prime minister, called an emergency cabinet meeting the following night to extend a state of emergency. The Home Minister in charge of national security was Khum Bahadur Khadka. The Parliament ratified the extension of the emergency by an additional three months on November 26. The Left Opposition, consisting of the Communist Party of Nepal (United Marxist-Leninist) and the Communist Party of Nepal (Marxist–Leninist), with 69 votes and the Nepali Congress with 113 votes with a two-thirds majority ratified the Constitution to extend the emergency.

The failure to detect the attack was criticised by K. P. Sharma Oli indicating the impossibility in the hill area for the movement of thousands of people without notice.

== After the war ==
The Sanphebagar Airport reopened in 2018 after the repair started in 2006 marking the end of civil war.

Achham Palace, the centre of administration, destroyed in the war was reconstructed in 2023.

== See also ==
- Nepalese Civil War
