= United Nations peacekeeping missions involving Nepal =

The Federal Democratic Republic of Nepal’s three main security agencies – Nepal Army, Armed Police Force Nepal and Nepal Police - contribute to United Nations (UN) peacekeeping. Civilian administrators and technical staff from Nepal also participate in UN peace operations both on an individual basis and when seconded from the government. Nepal is the largest contributor of troops towards UN peacekeeping efforts.

The Nepalese Army in UN Peacekeeping Operations

Mission (Contribution Type)	Year
UNOGIL, Lebanon (Military Observers)	1958
UNIPOM, India/Pakistan (Military Observers)	1966
UNEF II Sinai, Middle East (Troops)	1974
UNIFIL, Lebanon (Troops)	1978
UNMOT, Tajikistan	1989
UNGOMAP I/II, OSGAP I/II/III (Military Observers)	1989
UNIKOM Kuwait/Iraq (Force Commander)	1991
UNMIH, Haiti (Troops)	1991
UNTSO, Israel, Middle – East (Chief of Staff)	1992
UNISOM, Somalia (Troops)	1993
UNPF/UNPROFOR, Former Yugoslavia	1994
UNGCI, Iraq (Troops)	1995
UNTAES, Eastern Slovenia (Military Observers)	1996
UNPREDEP, Macedonia (Military Observers)	1996
UNOMIL, Liberia (Military Observers)	1996
UNMOP, Prevlaka (Military Observers)	1998
UNMIK, Kosovo (Military Observers)	1999
UNOMSIL/UNAMSIL, Sierra Leone (Troops)	1999
MONUC, DR Congo (Troops)	1999
UNAMET/UNTAET/UNMISET, East Timor (Troops)	1999
UNFICYP, Cyprus (Force Commander)	1999
UNMEE, Ethiopia/Eritrea (Military Observers)	2000
MINUCI, Ivory Coast (Military Observers)	2003
UNOCI, Ivory Coast (Military Observers)	2003
UNMIL, Liberia (Troops)	2003
UNDOF, Israel/Syria (Force Commander & Staff)	2004
MINUSTAH, Haiti (Troops)	2004
ONUB, Burundi (Troops)	2004
UNMIS/UNMISS, Sudan (Troops)	2004
UNIFIL, Lebanon (Troops)	2006
UNOMIG, Georgia (Military Observers)	2007
MINURCAT, Chad (Military Observers, Staff & Troops)	2008
UNAMID, Sudan (Military Observers to be followed by troops)	2008
UNAMI, Iraq (Staff)	2008
UNMIT, Timor-Leste	2008
MINURSO, Western Sahara	2010
UNSMIS, Syria	2012
UNISFA, Sudan	2013
