= Jamila Hammami =

Head of ICRC in Oman

Jamila Hammami is mission head in Oman for the International Committee of the Red Cross (ICRC).

== Life ==
Jamila Hammami was educated at Aix-Marseille University. She started working for the ICRC in 2002. In 2008 she called for Iraqi authorities to find the families of 62 Iraqi soldiers whose remains had been repatriated from Saudi Arabia. Later that year she helped organize the ICRC-brokered exchange of remains of nearly 250 soldiers killed in the Iran–Iraq War. In 2010 and 2011 she was working in Kathmandu, providing interim relief to survivors of the Nepalese Civil War. In 2014-5 she headed the ICRC team in Tripoli, Lebanon, working with communities affected by armed violence spilling over from the Syrian civil war.
