= Phuspa Ram KC =

Indian police officer

Phuspa Ram KC (Nepali: पुष्प राम केसी) was Inspector General of Armed Police Force (Nepal). He served as 11th Inspector General of Armed Police Force (Nepal).
