= Ganesh Man Pun =

Minister for Commerce and Supplies
- In office October 2015 – July 2016
- Prime Minister: KP Sharma Oli

Member of the Constituent Assembly
- In office 19 November 2013 – 2017
- Constituency: Rukum-1

Chairman of the Young Communist League
- In office December 2006 – 2011
- Preceded by: Office established

Personal details
- Born: December 4, 1974 (age 51) Pwang VDC-1, Rukum, Nepal
- Party: Communist Party of Nepal (Maoist Centre) (UCPN (Maoist) until 2016)
- Parent(s): Dil Bahadur Pun (Father); Teji Pun (Mother)
- Education: Proficiency Certificate Level
- Occupation: Politician
- Organizations: Young Communist League (YCL); Nepal Triathlon Association (NTA)

Military service
- Allegiance: CPN (Maoist)
- Branch/service: People's Liberation Army (PLA)
- Rank: Political Commissar and Division Commander
- Battles/wars: Nepalese Civil War

Ganesh Man Pun is a former Minister for Commerce and Supplies of Nepal. During the civil war, he was a political commissar and military commander of the 4th Division in the Maoist People's Liberation Army (PLA). He later transitioned to mainstream politics, serving as the founding chairman of the Young Communist League (YCL) and as an elected Member of Parliament representing Rukum-1. Additionally, he has served as the President of the Nepal Triathlon Association.

== Early life and military career ==
Born in Rukum – a key Maoist heartland within the Magar region – Ganesh Man Pun belongs to the Pun Magar clan of the Magar people. During the civil war, Pun was a senior CPN-Maoist cadre who initially served as the political commissar of the People's Liberation Army's (PLA) Parivarthan Memorial Ninth Brigade. He was later promoted to serve as both the political commissar and military commander of the PLA's 4th Division, leading many successful battles and campaigns across the mountains and plains of western Nepal.

== Political career ==
Following the end of the civil war and the subsequent peace process, Pun transitioned into mainstream politics and served as the founding chairman of the Young Communist League (YCL), the youth wing of the UCPN (Maoist) party. In this leadership role, he actively campaigned for internal party relief packages to provide financial support for full-time YCL cadres and wounded fighters on par with retired combatants. He later contested the 2013 Constituent Assembly election, winning the Rukum-1 constituency as a representative of the UCPN-Maoist.

In October 2015, Pun was appointed the Minister for Commerce and Supplies under K. P. Sharma Oli's coalition government. In this cabinet role, he actively oversaw the normalization of supply chains for daily essentials and implemented stricter central and district-level market monitoring to crack down on black marketing.

Journalist Sankarshan Thakur noted that during the civil war era, Pun was viewed as "public enemy number one" by state authorities and would have been unable to enter government precincts. Following the peace process, Pun appeared remarkably at ease working within the high halls of the state, while still maintaining that the revolution was not over. Upon his eventual integration into the cabinet, observers highlighted his transition to managing state apparatus and working to normalise public supply chains.

== Sports administration ==
Pun served as the President of the Nepal Triathlon Association (NTA) following its recognition by the National Sports Council. In March 2012, alongside General Secretary Nilendra Raj Shrestha, he organized the 1st South Asian Triathlon Championships in Nepal. Under his leadership, Nepalese triathletes competed internationally in the Philippines and China, winning gold medals and earning a national sports authority cash prize of 500,000 Rupees. Pun also represented Nepal at Asia Triathlon assemblies in Japan and New Zealand. Following his 2013 election to parliament, the association officially honored him at a function in Kathmandu, where he announced the hosting of the 2nd South Asian Championships at Begnas Lake in Pokhara.
