= Shailendra Khanal =

Indian police officer

Shailendra Khanal (Nepali: शैलेन्द्र खनाल) was Inspector General of Armed Police Force (Nepal). He served as 10th Inspector General of Armed Police Force (Nepal).
