= Young Communist League, Nepal =

Youth wing of Communist Party of Nepal (Maoist Centre

- Founded: 2006
- Headquarters: Kathmandu., Nepal
- Mother party: Communist Party of Nepal (Maoist)

Young Communist League, Nepal is the youth wing of Communist Party of Nepal (Maoist Centre). The president of YCL is Subodhraj Serpali and the general secretary of YCL is Ganesh Shahi. The Young Communist League (YCL) was formed by the CPN–Maoist at some point (there is no definite information on the year of its creation) during the 'people's war' to support the revolution. Ganesh Man Pun, Former chairman of the YCL, has stated that the League was reactivated in November 2006. According to him, the YCL "is a fusion of the Party's military and political character, and it is composed of PLA members who have an interest in politics." As the party's youth wing, its role is to "organise youth, be involved in events, conduct political awareness, and take part in development work as volunteers." Once the CPN-Maoist was proscribed, the YCL was also forced underground. After the April 2006 Jana Andolan (people's movement) and the subsequent over-ground role of the insurgents, the CPN-Maoist revived the YCL.

== Contribution to revolution ==
With the development of the Communist Party in Nepal, different youth organizations were established. These organizations remained on the forefront and played an important role in both mass movements and in the peasants movement. The Akhil Nepal Yuba Sangathan (All Nepal Youth Organization) was established in 1981 under the chairmanship of Comrade Prachanda and it played a positive role in the question of making revolutionary political line. In 1991, it was renamed the Young Communist League (YCL) and during the period of preparation of the People's War, it played an important role in completing the preparation of the People's War.

During the People's War it helped the People's War. In the new political context developed after the People's War and the nineteen-day-long Mass Movement, the Young Communist League was established on 2 December 2006. It conducted campaigns to establish a federal republic, and struggle for patriotism and republic and mobilized youth during the election of constitutional assembly.

== MCC Compact ==
MCC compact entered Nepal during the premiership of Bhattarai while a committee was formed during second premiership of Dahal to rectify MCC. During premiership of Bhattarai, Barsaman Pun was the finance minister while Krishna Bahadur Mahara was the finance minister during premiership of Dahal. Maoist leaders Matrika Prasad Yadav, Bina Magar, Shakti Bahadur Basnet, Giriraj Mani Pokharel and Ram Bahadur Thapa were part of Second Oli cabinet which took MCC to parliament. At the time, they had given approval to table MCC.

Party president Prachanda publicly maintained that the Millennium Challenge Corporation's (MCC) Nepal Compact could not be ratified without amending certain clauses. It was found that he was in favor of ratification as it was. MCC later released the letter dated September 29, 2021, in which Prachanda and Prime Minister of Nepal Sher Bahadur Deuba assured MCC that the compact would be ratified within four to five months. Major national newspapers criticized Prachanda's move, saying it would deteriorate Nepal's diplomatic strength and virtue.

They reported that it was dual nature of the party to both stay in government and protest at the same time for personal profit and vote swing. This move was highly criticized by people and medias.

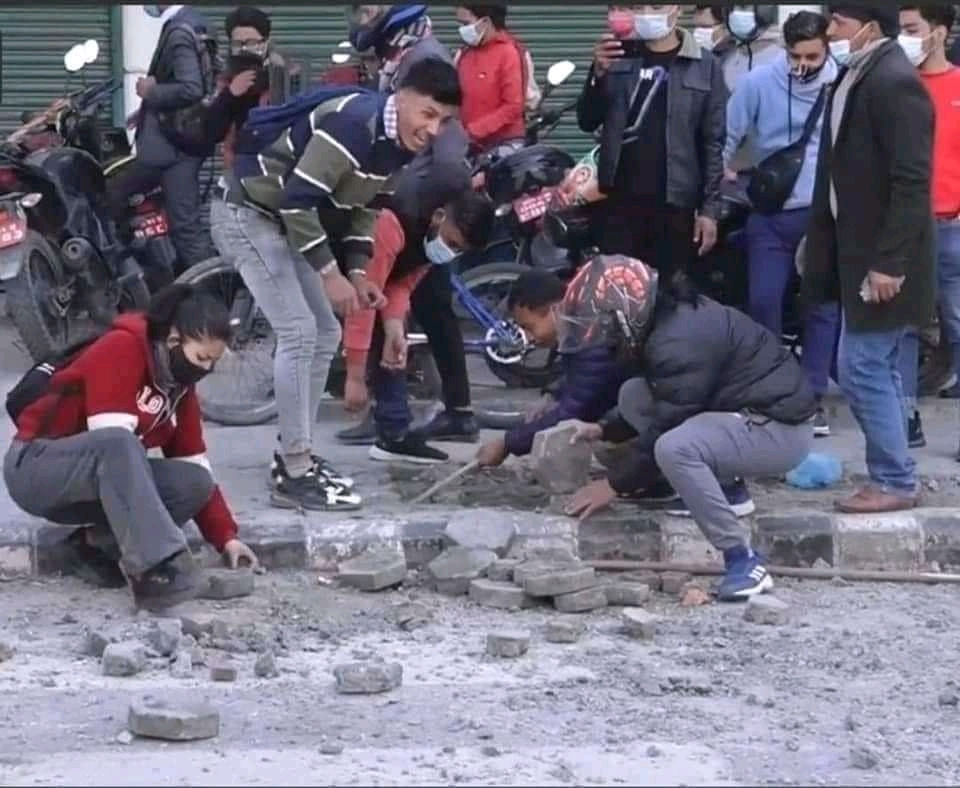
CPN (Maoist Centre) sister organisation, YCL leaders destroying footpath to attack police force

The party chairman had given approval to table MCC while several fellow politicians stood in opposition to the chairman's decision. They called for protests even on streets. Many police were attacked. Trees were broken, the blocks of footpath were removed to attack police as shown in picture. The branches of trees were broken. The Maoist cadets destroyed a boutique while the owner was saving police. Government had to pay for the loss. Leader of opposition and chairman of Communist Party of Nepal (Unified Marxist–Leninist), KP Sharma Oli of condemned the decision of Maoists to stay in government while destroying public property at the same time. The Home Minister of Nepal, Bal Krishna Khan's and Prime minister asked the protesters to stay calm and not destroy public properties casing loss to the government and economy.

== Leadership and Cadre ==
At its first national convention in the capital Kathmandu in February 2007, which was inaugurated by the CPN-Maoist Chairman Pushpa Kamal Dahal a.k.a. Prachanda, the YCL formed a 45-member new Central Committee with Ganeshman Pun as its chairman, Uma Bhujel as its vice-chairman, Dileep Kumar Prajapati as General Secretary, R. P. Sharma as Secretary and Bhagwat Baduwal as Treasurer.

Ganeshman Pun is a senior CPN-Maoist cadre and was the 'Commissar' of the Parivarthan Memorial Ninth Brigade of the People's Liberation Army (PLA). Uma Bhujel is a PLA 'section commander' famous for leading a successful jailbreak in Gorkha on March 31, 2001, along with five of her associates. Dileep Kumar Prajapati and Bhagwat Baduwal are top ranking commanders in the PLA. Another Central Committee member, Chandra Bahadur Thapa a.k.a. Comrade Sagar, who is in charge of YCL's Kathmandu region, is a former 'battalion commander' of the Dinesh-Ramji Samiti Brigade. Senior YCL leader, Sabitri Gurung, is a 'deputy battalion commander' of the PLA.

Each of these above-mentioned leaders is a dedicated member of the CPN-Maoist and some allege that they have been appointed to the YCL in order to evade inclusion in the mechanisms for the management of arms and armies by the United Nations. Nanda Kishor Pun, the Maoist Central Committee member and PLA one of 'senior commander', in an interview to Nepali Times conceded, "It is true that at present some commanders have been sent to the YCL. They are individuals who were previously active in the YCL and have experience."

YCL are unarmed young cadres without any formal military training. It is alleged that some YCL cadres receive some military style training but this has not been widely seen since 2008. Former PLA members who fought during the insurgency era are a minority within the YCL; most members have joined since the Comprehensive Peace Accord of 2006. YCL members in many areas enjoy relative impunity from arrest, because of the strength of the UCPN-M and its influence over local officials. In addition to political activities the YCL also engages its cadres in activities such as cleaning localities, cleaning rivers and planting trees. On occasion, they have involved themselves in quasi-policing activities like traffic management, night patrolling, demolition of illegal houses, and the capture of alleged gangsters to help the government for a progressive effort.

== Involvement in Violence ==
The Young Communist League (YCL) has been associated with various instances of violence and coercive tactics, and has roots within the armed struggle led by the CPN-Maoist.

Reports indicate that YCL cadres have been involved in acts of intimidation, coercion, and harassment against individuals, groups, and organizations perceived as opposing or critical of the CPN-Maoist's agenda. This has included political rivals, civil society members, and even dissenting voices within their own communities. They have been known to employ force during public demonstrations and protests, often resulting in confrontations with law enforcement agencies and other groups.

The YCL has allegedly engaged in quasi-policing activities, including traffic management, night patrolling, and demolition of alleged illegal structures.

The YCL has faced allegations of human rights abuses, including arbitrary detention, assault, kidnapping, and even reports of torture. Additionally, there have been allegations of YCL involvement in extortion and other criminal activities, such as illegal land grabs and forced contributions. These actions are often carried out under the pretext of advancing the CPN-Maoist's revolutionary objectives.

Tensions between the YCL and political opponents have, at times, escalated into violent clashes. Some YCL members, particularly those with military training, have been implicated in armed clashes.

From March 17, 2007, to December 31, 2010, the Young Communist League (YCL) was implicated in a total of 19 recorded killings: 3 in 2010, 4 in 2009, 9 in 2008, and 3 in 2007. This includes 8 YCL cadres and activists, 7 activists and cadres of other parties (including a 7th grader), and 3 unaffiliated civilians (2 youths and an elderly man). Political organizations that were involved in fatal clashes with the YCL during this period include the Youth Force, the JTMM-Arun Faction, the CPN-UML, the MJF, the Nepali Congress, and the Unified CPN-M.

Following this period, from November 2013 onwards, there was a respite in recorded instances of fatal violence linked to the YCL. However, on November 27, 2013, a YCL activist was killed by a member of the CPN-UML, breaking the lull in violent incidents. Subsequently, as of 2017, there were no further recorded instances of fatal YCL-linked violence.

== Imitation of the YCL ==
After the CPN-Maoist formed its youth organization, other parties formed similar youth organizations. The Terai-based regional party, Madeshi Janaadhikar Forum, formed its Madhesi Youth Force. The UML (United Marxist Leninist) formed its 'Youth Force' which was similar to the Young Communist League, Nepal. It was advocating for a ban on organizations like the YCL as a 'hurdle' for peace and stability. Ultimately, the CPN-Maoist claimed that mobilization of youth was very much necessary for the enrichment of national integrity and sovereignty in today's context.

After a defeat in the CA polls held recently which reduced it to a third party, CPN (UML) concluded that their defeat resulted from a lack of youth cadres like the YCL of the CPN-Maoist. Thus, realizing the necessity of such a youth wing, the UML decided to form 'Youth Force'. The media reported that some of the Nepali Congress cadres formed a similar organization in Dolakha, but the Nepali Congress president denied that such a youth force had been formed and claimed that there is no plan of forming anything like the YCL or Youth Force in the future.

== See also ==
- Youth Federation Nepal
