= Women in the Nepalese Civil War =

Women were a significant group who were involved in the Maoist movement during the Nepalese Civil War, which refers to a violent insurgency that took place from 1996 to 2006. The insurgency was led by the Communist Party of Nepal (Maoist) (Nepali: नेपाल कम्युनिष्ट पार्टी (माओवादी-केन्द्र), or CPN (M-C) with the aim of establishing a People's Republic and ending the rule of the Nepalese Monarchy. During this time, over 13,000 civilians and public officials were murdered, approximately 200,000 were displaced, and numerous others were tortured, extorted, and intimidated. Although the majority of Maoist insurgents were men, the Maoist Party claimed that up to 40 percent of their 19,000 combatants were women. This was regarded as an unprecedented move at the time, given that women were forbidden from fighting in the Nepalese Army until 2003.

== Reasons for participation ==
The Communist Party of Nepal (Maoist) was able to garner such a large degree of support primarily due to its ideology which called for the equal treatment of persons irrespective of gender, ethnic, regional, or caste-based differences. This message was starkly different from the pervading views in Nepali society which were firmly rooted in a feudal and caste-based system.

=== Women's economic oppression ===
Until 2008, Nepali society was structured around a feudal system that was dominated by peasant production. This meant that the state as well as the powerful local nobility were able to influence the access individuals had to land, which disadvantaged many groups in Nepal. In fact, according to a NGO, Rural Reconstruction Nepal, 50% of the households in Nepal own only 6.6 percent of the land, whereas the top 9 percent of landowners control 47 percent of the land. This skewed distribution of land has led to high rates of poverty across the nations as individuals do not have enough land to be self-sufficient and they are further exploited by the high interest rates they pay due to borrowing money from local lenders and government loan agencies. Although feudalism has inhibited the economic progress of numerous communities across Nepal, women in particular have been victims of this system. Women's economic mobility in Nepal has long been hindered by the patrilineal relation of the land-ownership system, which prevented women from inheriting land and subsequently denied them the right to own land to the same extent as their male counterparts. This unequal access to land was aggravated by the fact that over 90 percent of female workers in 2001 were employed in the agriculture industry, the majority of whom were disproportionately tasked with hard labor and were still paid less than half the amount of their male counterparts. One of the major goals of the Maoist Party was to uproot Nepal's longstanding feudal system, which could have furthered the attractiveness of the movement to disadvantaged groups such as rural women.

=== Women's social oppression ===
According to a senior female Maoist Party leader, Comrade Parvati, in Nepal "women's social oppression is firmly rooted in state sponsored Hindu religion which upholds feudal Brahminical rule based on caste system, which disparages women in relation to men". As an official Hindu state, ideologies such as the caste system play a crucial role in defining the social lives of Nepali citizens, with the Brahmins regarded as the nobles and the highest-ranking members of society whereas the Dalits or the untouchables are labelled as the lowest members of the caste system. Women are especially disadvantaged under the caste system as they are depicted solely as a means for reproduction. This limits the role of women as purely that of mothers and wives. Furthermore, Dalit women are especially vulnerable as they are not only seen to be of lower status due to their position as women but are further exploited due to their caste. Dalit women are forbidden from entering temples, touching food at common gatherings and accessing public places with drinking water sources. In addition to the divisions created by the caste system, Nepali women have been systematically disadvantaged by the burden of dowries, which require the bride's family to provide the groom's family with property or wealth in order to guarantee a marriage union. This requirement has led to the discrimination of women in Nepali society, and has led to high rates of female feticide among rural families as the cost of bearing female children is considered too high in comparison with the benefits. As a result of these social pressures on women, it is not surprising that many women found the Maoist Party's focus on gender equality appealing.

== Roles ==
During the People's War, for the first time in Nepal, women were given the chance to participate on equal footing as men. Women became combatants, with notable figures such as Comrade Parvati rising to the ranks of a Maoist commander. Other women took on the roles of nurses for wounded soldiers, couriers, organizers, propagandists, activists and even espionage workers. The participation of women as activists and espionage workers was particularly effective for the Maoist cause in Nepal. This was because Nepali society's traditional view of women as homemakers meant that female activists and espionage workers were able to easily access new areas and mobilize masses of individuals in a way that male members could not.

== Notable figures ==
The following women are examples of some of the female participants in the Maoist movement:

- Dilmiya Yonjan: The first female combatant to join the Maoists. She was killed while igniting a bomb during an armed conflict against police in Bethan.
- Kamala Bhatta: The President of ANWA (All Women's Nepal Association) in Gorkha, an organization that was integral to the training and recruitment of Nepali women in the movement. She was raped and killed by the Gorkha police force.
- Devi Khadka: A prominent activist during the People's War. Before her involvement with the Maoist movement, she was held in police custody in the Dolkha district and was repeatedly raped by officers for refusing to sign the death certificate of her brother who was imprisoned at the time. She is currently a Maoist MP in Nepal.
- Bindi Chaulagai: A local Nepali woman who was a supporter of the movement and frequently provided rebels with food. Upon discovering her ties to the Maoists, police officers tortured Bindi while she was pregnant. This led to the premature delivery of her baby, its death, and subsequently her own death a few days later.
- Lali Rokka: A health worker and activist who assisted Maoist combatants in the Rolpa district. She was shot dead by the police for her role in supporting the movement.
- Hisila Yami: The daughter of a famous Nepali freedom fighter Dharma Ratna Yami. Hisila was one of the most well-known female leaders in the Maoist movement. In 1995, she became the leader of the All Nepal's Women Association and served a two-year term. She is currently a Central Committee member of the Communist Party of Nepal.

== Number of female victims and participants ==
According to INSEC, an organization which specializes in human rights issues in Nepal, 1,665 out of the 15,026 deaths (approximately 11 percent of all deaths) that occurred during the People's War were female victims. Based on this dataset, the dynamics of the violence against women appears to very asymmetric, with government forces being responsible for 85 percent of the killings. Although the dataset does not explicitly differentiate between members of the Maoist movement and unaffiliated civilians, the Maoists are recognized for their inclusion of a significant number of women during the People's War. A number of studies carried out by organizations such as the Institute of Human Rights Nepal, and researchers such as Seira Tamang, Sonal Singh, Edward Mills and Adhikari have estimated that female participation in the Maoist movement during the People's War was between 30 and 50 percent. However these results vary, with more recent estimates provided by the UN illustrated that only 24% of the combatants in the People's Liberation Army (Maoist) were women. This discrepancy in estimates could be due to the fact that there were many women who were participants in the movement, and yet were not necessarily engaged in combat.

== Effects and reintegration ==
The motto of the People's War included declarations of better lives for Nepali citizens and in particular for women. However, many of the women who once bore arms and fought for the Maoist cause were later faced with a double victimization as they sought to reintegrate into post-war Nepal. For example, Rachna Shahi, a former combatant in the Maoist Party, describes that after the end of the People's War, her "family doesn't accept (her) and society looks at (her) with hatred". The process of post-war reintegration was particularly difficult for female combatants who were confronted with the rigid gender roles of traditional Nepali society. Judith Pettigrew and Sara Shneiderman shed light on this in their research as they describe that much of the negative sentiments towards female participants of the Maoist movement were rooted in a disapproval that women "ignored "feminine" duties such as chastity and motherhood during the conflict". The social exclusion of female participants in the Maoist movement was furthered by the fact that many of the individuals in charge of organizing post-war reintegration programs did not recognize the efforts of women in the People's War and subsequently failed to implement gender-inclusive initiatives. In addition to being stigmatized for their role as women in the People's War, they had to face the larger effects of returning to conventional jobs and relationships after having spent almost a decade engaged in war. These effects were most evident in economic reintegration efforts as many of the skills of combatants and other participants in the movement had either become obsolete due to automation and technological developments, or had drastically altered, requiring them to undergo training and restart their occupational trajectory.

== See also ==
- Pir
