= Dipendra Pun Magar =

Minister for Health of Lumbini province
- Incumbent
- Assumed office 18 April 2024
- Premier: Jokh Bahadur Mahara

Member of the Lumbini provincial assembly
- Incumbent
- Assumed office November 2022
- Constituency: Rolpa 1(B)

Personal details
- Born: Rolpa district, Nepal
- Party: Communist Party of Nepal (Maoist Centre) (2023–present; pre–2022)
- Other political affiliations: Independent (2022–2023)
- Occupation: Politician

Military service
- Allegiance: Communist Party of Nepal (Maoist)
- Branch/service: People's Liberation Army (PLA)
- Rank: Brigade Commissioner and Commander
- Battles/wars: Nepalese Civil War

Dipendra Pun Magar, also known by his nom de guerre Sijal, is a Nepalese politician serving as the Minister for Health of Lumbini province since April 2024 and a member of the Lumbini provincial assembly. During the Nepalese Civil War, he served as a PLA Brigade Commissioner and commander for the Communist Party of Nepal (Maoist), later becoming a member of the politburo and the district chief of Rolpa District.

== Political career ==
Before entering politics, Magar was a commander of the communist movement in Rolpa, directing local military operations and mobilizations during the civil war.

=== 2017 election ===
Magar was the official candidate of the left alliance in the 2017 Nepalese provincial elections, and was elected to Lumbini's provincial assembly, representing the Rolpa 1(Kha) constituency.

=== 2022 election and expulsion ===
Pun Magar sought re-election to the Lumbini provincial assembly during the 2022 provincial elections for the Rolpa 1(B) constituency (also known as Rolpa-2). When the ruling political coalition bypassed him to field Amar Singh Pun of the Nepali Congress as its joint candidate, Magar resigned his posts as a Maoist politburo member and Rolpa in-charge to run an independent campaign. As a result, the CPN (Maoist Centre) formally expelled him for anti-party rebel candidacy. Running under the "cross" election symbol, Magar won the seat with 14,927 votes, defeating Amar Singh Pun by a margin of 4,521 votes.

=== Return to party ===
On 4 January 2023, Pun Magar submitted a formal letter of self-criticism to Prime Minister and Maoist Centre Chairman Pushpa Kamal Dahal. He was subsequently re-inducted into the party at the Prime Minister's official residence in Baluwatar, Kathmandu. On 18 April 2024, Pun Magar was appointed as the provincial Minister for Health in the cabinet led by Chief Minister Jokh Bahadur Mahara, taking his oath of office at the Provincial Chief's office in Butwal.
