= Krishna Mohan Shrestha =

Nepalese Police officer

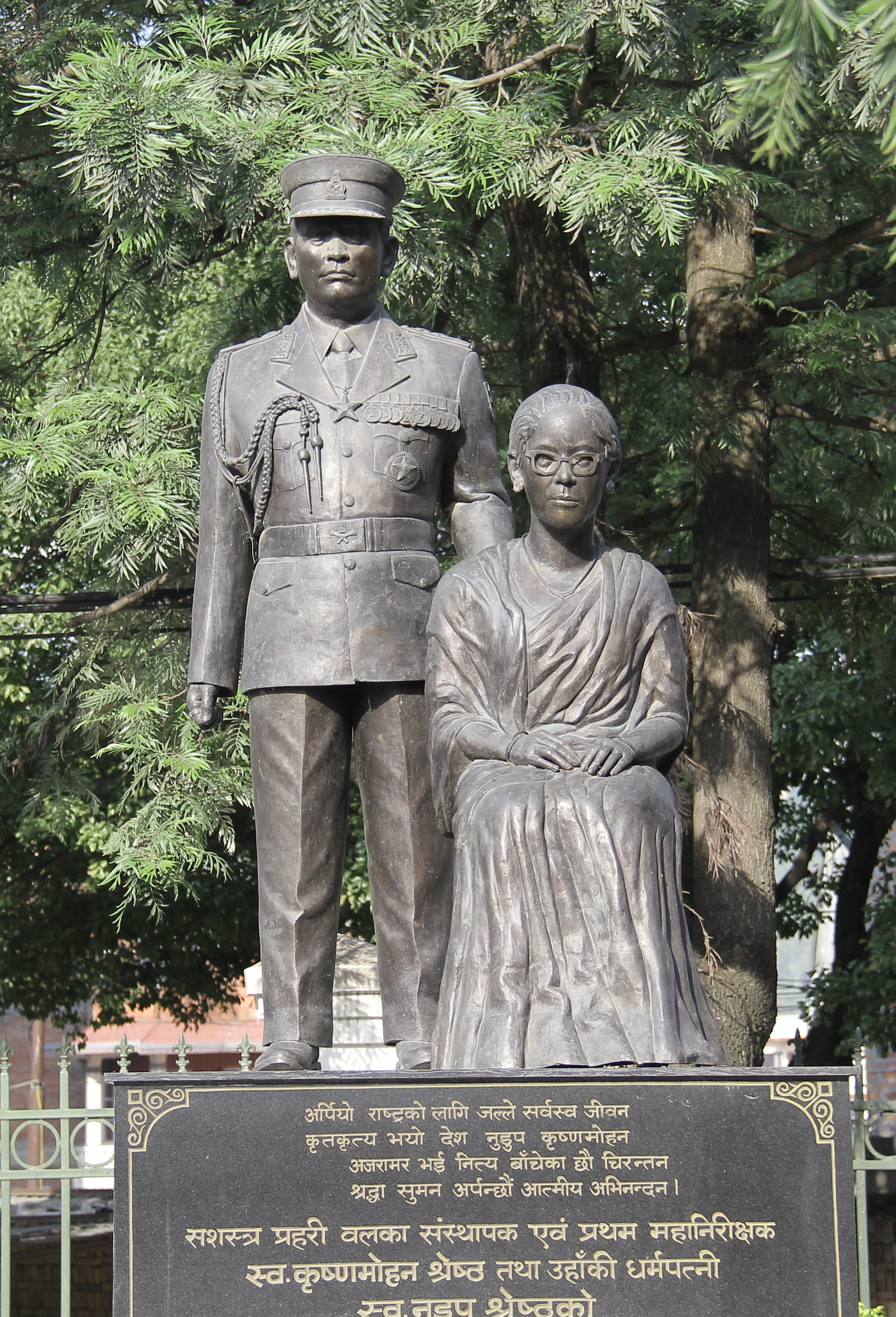
Statue of Krishnamohan and his wife Nudup at the place they were assassinated. The writing spells out his contribution for the Nation is immortal.

Krishna Mohan Shrestha (d. 2003; Nepali: कृष्णमोहन श्रेष्ठ) was the first Inspector General of Armed Police Force (Nepal).

Shrestha was killed by the Maoist insurgents during the Maoist insurgency in Nepal. Krishna Mohan along with his wife and bodyguard was assassinated on the morning of 25 January 2003 by gunmen in Lalitpur, while he was taking a morning walk as they used to do on Sunday mornings, intending to represent general safety to fellow citizens. The Inspector General and his wife, who was a teacher at an international school in the capital, were both unarmed. His wife Nudup Shrestha was a senior teacher in the Lincoln School, Kathmandu.
