= Nepalese Civil War =

Maoist insurgency in Nepal (1996–2006)

- Part of Communism in Nepal
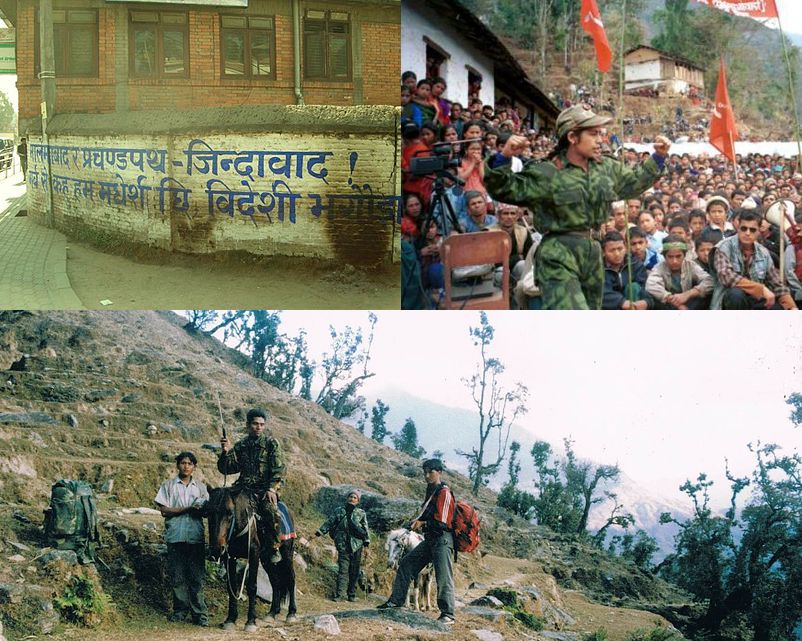
- Images of the Nepalese civil war
Date	13 February 1996 – 21 November 2006 (10 years, 9 months, 1 week and 1 day)
Location	Nepal
Result	Comprehensive Peace Accord; Abolition of Nepalese monarchy

Belligerents
Kingdom of Nepal; Nepalese Armed Forces; Royal Nepali Army; Nepal Police; Armed Police Force	Communist Party of Nepal (Maoist): People's Liberation Army, Nepal

Commanders and leaders
King of Nepal: Birendra Bir Bikram Shah Dev (1972–2001); Gyanendra Bir Bikram Shah Dev (2001–2008); Prime Minister of Nepal: Sher Bahadur Deuba (1995–1997; 2001–2002; 2004–2005); Lokendra Bahadur Chand (1997–1997; 2002–2003); Surya Bahadur Thapa (1997–1998; 2003–2004); Girija Prasad Koirala (1998–1999; 2000–2001; 2006–2008); Krishna Prasad Bhattarai (1999–2000); COAS of the Nepalese Army: Dharmapaal Barsingh Thapa (1995–1999); Prajwalla Shumsher JBR (1999–2003); Pyar Jung Thapa (2003–2006); Rookmangud Katawal (2006–2009); IGP of Nepal Police: Moti Lal Bohora (1992–1996); Achyut Krishna Kharel (1996–1996; 1996–1999); Dhruba Bahadur Pradhan (1996–1996); Pradip Shumsher J.B.R. (1999–2002); Shyam Bhakta Thapa (2002–2006); Om Bikram Rana (2006–2008)	Pushpa Kamal Dahal (Prachanda); Baburam Bhattarai (Laldhwaj); Mohan Baidya (Kiran); Nanda Kishor Pun (Pasang); Barsaman Pun (Ananta); Dipendra Pun Magar (Sijal); Ganesh Man Pun (Rashmi); Ram Bahadur Thapa (Badal); Netra Bikram Chand (Biplav)

Strength
95,000	50,000

Casualties and losses
4,500 killed	8,200 killed (guerrillas)
- 17,800 - 20,000 killed 1,300 missing

The Nepalese Civil War (1996–2006) was a protracted and countrywide armed conflict in the then Kingdom of Nepal between the Kingdom's rulers and the Communist Party of Nepal (Maoist), with the latter making significant use of guerrilla warfare. It began on 13 February 1996, when the CPN(M) initiated an insurgency with the stated purpose of overthrowing the Nepali monarchy and establishing a people's republic. It ended with the signing of the Comprehensive Peace Accord on 21 November 2006.

The conflict was characterized by numerous crimes against humanity, including murders, purges, kidnappings, and rapes. More than 17,000 people (including both civilians and armed forces) were killed during the conflict, including over 4,000 Nepalese killed by Maoists from 1996 to 2005, and over 8,200 Nepalese killed by government forces from 1996 to 2005. The Commission for Investigation of Enforced Disappearances has received 3,093 complaints.

== Overview ==
On 10 January 1990, the United Left Front (ULF) was formed, which, together with the Nepali Congress, was the backbone of the movement for democratic change. However, communist groups, uncomfortable with the alliance between the ULF and the Congress, formed a parallel front: the United National People's Movement (UNPM). The UNPM called for elections to a constituent assembly, and rejected compromises made by the ULF and the Congress party with the palace. In November 1990, the Communist Party of Nepal (Unity Centre), or CPN(UC), was formed, and included key elements of the UNPM. On 21 January 1991, the CPN(UC) set up the United People's Front of Nepal (UPFN), with Baburam Bhattarai as its head, as an open front to contest elections. The CPN(UC) held its first convention on 25 November 1991; it adopted a line of "protracted armed struggle on the route to a new democratic revolution", and decided that the party would remain an underground party. In the 1991 election, the UPFN became the third-largest party in the Nepali parliament. However, disagreements within the UPFN surged, regarding which tactics were to be used by the party. One group, led by Pushpa Kamal Dahal (Prachanda), argued for immediate armed revolution, while the other group, led by Nirmal Lama, claimed that Nepal was not yet ripe for armed struggle.

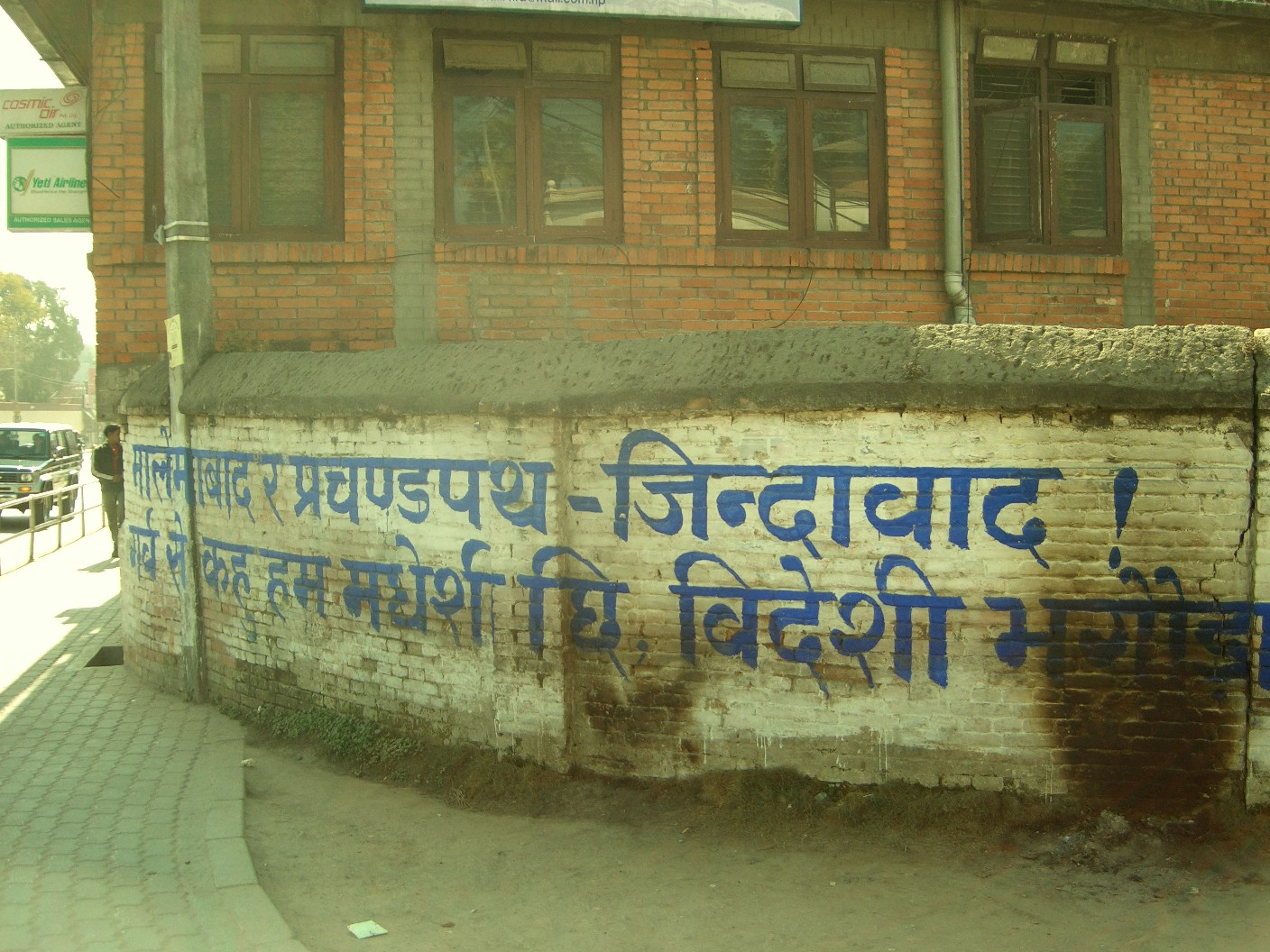
Communist graffiti in Kathmandu. It reads: "Long Live Marxism–Leninism–Maoism and Prachanda Path!"

On 22 May 1994, the CPN(UC)/UPFN was split in two. The militant faction later renamed itself the Communist Party of Nepal (Maoist), or CPN(M). This faction described the government forces, mainstream political parties, and the monarchy, as "feudal forces". The armed struggle began on 13 February 1996, when the CPN(M) carried out seven simultaneous attacks over six districts. Among these was the assault on the Holeri police station in Rolpa—one of the three major attacks on security forces launched by the Maoists on the first day of the war—which was commanded by party leader Barsaman Pun, who later became a deputy commander of the People's Liberation Army (PLA). Initially, the government mobilized the Nepal Police to contain the insurgency. The Royal Nepal Army was not involved in direct fighting because the conflict was regarded as a policing matter. On Friday, 1 June 2001, King Birendra, and his entire family were killed in a massacre at the Narayanhiti Palace – the official residence of the Shah monarchs. Perpetrated by Prince Dipendra, the heir apparent to the Nepali throne, there were ten deaths and five injuries – four injured victims and one self-inflicted injury on Dipendra after shooting himself in the head in an apparent suicide attempt. Dipendra fell into a coma for three days before dying, during which he was crowned as the new king. On 25 July 2001, the government of Sher Bahadur Deuba and the Maoist insurgents declared a ceasefire, and held peace talks from August to November of that year. The failure of these peace talks resulted in the return to armed conflict, beginning with the Maoist attack on an army barracks in Dang District in western Nepal, on 22 November. The situation changed dramatically in 2002, as the number of attacks by both sides increased greatly, and more people died than in any other year of the war.

The government responded by banning anti-monarchy statements, imprisoning journalists, and shutting down newspapers accused of siding with the insurgents. Several rounds of negotiations, accompanied by temporary ceasefires, were held between the insurgents and the government. The government categorically rejected the insurgents' demand for constituent assembly elections. At the same time, the Maoists refused to recognize the continued survival of a constitutional monarchy. In November 2004, the government rejected both the Maoists' request to negotiate directly with King Gyanendra rather than via Prime Minister Deuba, and the Maoists' request for discussions to be mediated by a third party such as the United Nations.

Throughout the war, the government controlled the main cities and towns, while the Maoists dominated the rural areas. In August 2004, the Maoists declared a week-long blockade of Kathmandu city which was later called off.

On 1 February 2005, in response to the inability of the relatively democratic government to restore order, King Gyanendra seized direct power and declared a state of emergency in an attempt to definitively end the insurgency. He proclaimed, "democracy and progress contradict one another...in pursuit of liberalism, we should never overlook an important aspect of our conduct, namely discipline." As a result of this takeover, the United Kingdom and India both suspended their material support for Nepal. According to reports by Nepali newspaper Kantipur, China supplied arms and military equipment to the Gyanendra regime in November 2005; it was the first time China provided arms during the decade-long conflict. On 5 May 2005, in response to the takeover by King Gyanendra, seven political parties began talks to form a Seven Party Alliance (SPA). On 22 November 2005, with support from the Indian government, Maoist rebels and the SPA jointly issued a 12-point resolution, which described autocratic monarchy as the main obstacle to "democracy, peace, prosperity, social upliftment and an independent and sovereign Nepal", and included a commitment to hold elections to a constituent assembly and for the Maoist rebels to renounce violence.

In 2006, violent conflict decreased significantly, and instead, resistance transformed into non-violent pro-democracy demonstrations. The municipal elections held in February were boycotted by seven major parties. Instead, over 70 minor political parties promoted candidates. Officially, voter turnaround was 20 percent. Throughout April, pro-democracy demonstrations were held across Nepal, and 19 demonstrators were killed, over 400 protesters were arrested, while dozens of others were injured. On 21 April, King Gyanendra announced that he would return governance to the SPA, but this offer was rejected by both the Maoist rebels and the SPA. On 24 April, King Gyanendra announced that he would also reinstate the House of Representatives, which satisfied the SPA, who formed the reinstated house. On 9 August, the government and the Maoist rebels agreed to accept the United Nations to monitor the peace process and to manage the arms of both sides. On 21 November, the government, the SPA, and the Maoist rebels signed the Comprehensive Peace Accord, which formally ended the conflict. Following the peace accord, the Maoists reactivated their youth wing, the Young Communist League (YCL), under the leadership of former PLA commander Ganesh Man Pun to transition combatants into political operations.

The conflict forced young workers to seek work abroad, predominantly in the Persian Gulf and south-east Asia. The economy of Nepal is still heavily dependent on the infusion of foreign income from these migrant workers. As a result of the conflict, Nepal's tourism industry suffered considerably.

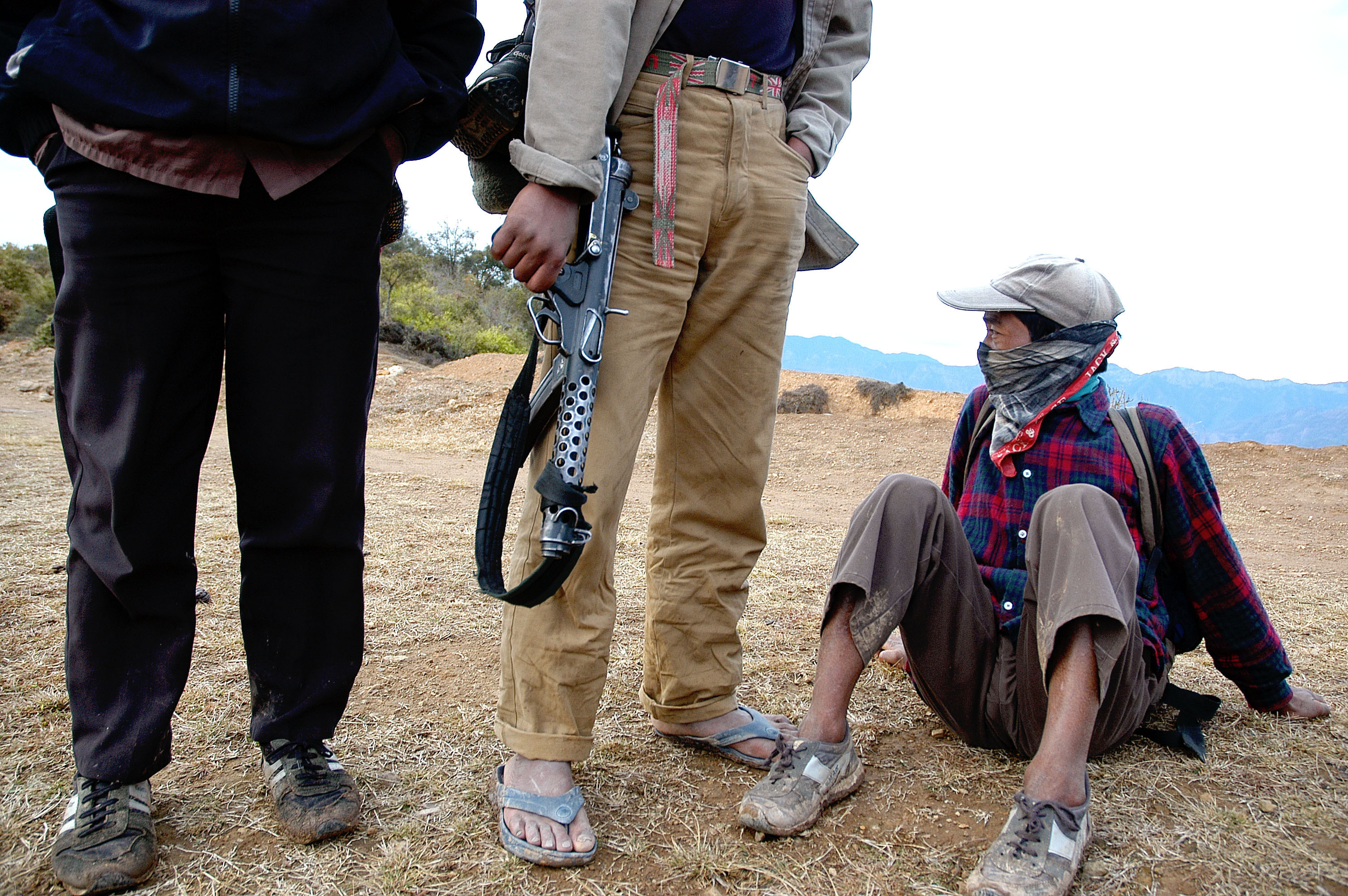
Three Maoist rebels wait on top of a hill in Rolpa District for orders to relocate.

== Timeline ==
=== Early events ===
- 13 February 1996: Initiation of "the people's war" by the Communist Party of Nepal (Maoist).

=== 2001 ===
- January: The government creates the Armed Police Force, a paramilitary force to fight the insurgents.
- 28 May: Chairman Prachanda gives an interview with the Communist journal A World to Win.
- 1 June: King Birendra and most of the royal family were killed in the Nepalese royal massacre. Crown Prince Dipendra was accused of the massacre by the Incident Inquiry Committee consisting of Chief Justice Keshav Prasad Upadhaya, and the speaker of the House of Representatives, Taranath Ranabhat. Dipendra, supposedly comatose after a suicide attempt, is crowned king, according to tradition. He supposedly died on 4 June 2001. Gyanendra is then crowned King.
- 3 August: The first round of peace talks begin.
- 23 November: Peace talks collapse when the Maoists withdraw and launch a ferocious attack on Police and Army posts in 42 districts.
- 26 November: The government of Sher Bahadur Deuba declares a nationwide State of Emergency and deploys the Nepal Army.
- US State Department declares Maoist political party as a terrorist organization. The United States Congress approves US$12 million to train Royal Nepal Army officers and supply 5,000 M16 rifles.

=== 2002 ===
- 17 March: Security Forces (Royal Nepal Army Soldiers and police) conducted a surprise raid on a Maoist training center in the jungles near Gumchal in the western district of Rolpa. The surprise attack killed 62 Maoists. A separate incident in western districts killed six Maoists, bringing the number to 68.
- May: Peace talks collapse. Large battles are fought between Army and Maoist forces at Lisne Lekh along the boundary between Pyuthan and Rolpa districts, and in Gam village, Rolpa.
- 22 May: King Gyanendra, acting on the advice of Prime Minister Sher Bahadur Deuba, dissolves Parliament and orders new elections. The reason given for the dissolution is opposition to the state of emergency.
- 11 July: Information leaks out that the Belgian weapon manufacturer FN Herstal is allowed to deliver 5,500 M249 SAW light machine guns to the Nepali monarchy, a decision made by all coalition parties. Minister of External Affairs Louis Michel speaks of "a country in a pluralistic democracy."
- 4 October: King Gyanendra deposes Prime Minister Deuba and the entire Council of Ministers, assumes executive power, and cancels the elections for the dissolved House of Representatives, which had been scheduled for 11 November 2002.
- 11 October: King Gyanendra appoints Lokendra Bahadur Chand as Prime Minister.

=== 2003 ===
- January: The United States hold exercises with the Nepali army. Maoist insurgents kill the Inspector General of Armed Police, Krishna Mohan Shrestha, his wife and his bodyguard, Head Constable Subhash Bahadur Gurung of the Armed Police Force, while on their morning walk, as they used to do on Sunday mornings, intending to represent general safety to fellow citizens. The Inspector General and his wife, who was a teacher at an international school in the capital, were both unarmed. They were riddled with bullets from Type 56 assault rifles and G3 rifles used by the Maoists.
- 29 January: A second ceasefire is established and peace talks begin.
- 13 May: Code of conduct jointly declared by the government and the CPN-M for the mutually agreed period of cease-fire
- 17 August: Nepali military and police forces kill 39 Maoist rebels in the Ramechhap district of central Nepal during an offensive launched jointly by the Army, Police, and Air Force of Nepal. 7 soldiers of the Nepali Army and 5 Constables of the Armed Police are also killed in the operation.
- 24 August: The Maoists set an ultimatum, threatening to withdraw from the cease-fire if the government does not agree within 48 hours to include the question of the Maoists participating in the Constituent Assembly.
- 26 August: The Maoist ultimatum expires.
- 27 August:
  - Strike: The Maoist call for a three-day strike to denounce the Army's attacks on their cadres
  - The Maoists unilaterally withdraw from 29 January ceasefire. Prachanda's statement revives the rebels' demand for an end to monarchic rule in favor of a "people's republic", stating, "Since the old regime has put an end to the forward-looking solution to all existing problems through the ceasefire and peace talks, we herein declare that the rationale behind ceasefire...and peace process has ended."
- 28 August: Maoist hitmen shoot two colonels of the Royal Nepal Army in their homes in Kathmandu, killing one and injuring the other.
- 29 August: Maoist insurgents unsuccessfully attempt to assassinate Devendra Raj Kandel, a Nepali minister.
- 31 August: Maoist insurgents ambush a Nepali police outpost in Rupandehi, killing 4 policemen.
- 2 September: Maoist insurgents ambush a Nepali police outpost in Siraha, killing 2 policemen and injuring four others.
- 27 September: "Fifteen people including 8 rebels and 4 policemen were killed and suspected Maoists bombed five government utilities despite the guerrillas' plans for a nine-day truce from 2 October, officials said. Eight Maoists were killed in a gun battle with security forces at Chhita Pokhara in the Khotang district, 340 kilometres east of Kathmandu, a police officer said. 4 Policemen were also killed. Elsewhere in eastern Nepal, the Maoists killed two policemen, Constable Purna Prasad Sharma and Head Constable Radha Krishna Gurung, and a woman selling beetle nuts, Kali Tamang, in the Jaljale-Gaighat area, an official said. 'A group of seven Maoists descended from a public bus when police were checking the passengers and suddenly opened fire from an automatic pistol, killing the three and wounding two others,' said Sitaram Prasad Pokharel, the chief administrator for the region. In Janakpur, an industrial hub on the Indian border 260 kilometres south-east of Kathmandu, the Maoists under the direct command of Prachanda carried out five early morning bombings that disrupted telephone service and power, police said. No one was killed directly by the blasts but an elderly man died of a heart attack after hearing the explosions, Police Deputy Superintendent Bharat Chhetri said. He said the sites that were bombed included the offices of the roads department and the Nepal Electricity Authority and a telecommunications tower. Police personnel and Maoists traded fire for nearly 40 minutes after the blasts but the rebels escaped and 37 people were injured, Mr Khadka said."
- 13 October: At least 42 Police Recruits and 9 Maoists are killed when an estimated 3,000 Maoists attempt to storm a Police Training Center in Bhaluwang. "'The rebels had snapped telephone cables, set up roadblocks by felling trees or blowing up highway bridges to prevent reinforcements from coming,' a witness, Krishna Adhikary, told Reuters."
- 27 October: " Colonel Adrian Griffith and six Nepali nationals were freed last week 42 hours after being taken captive in Baglung, 300 km (190 mi) west of Kathmandu, while on a drive to recruit young Gurkha soldiers to serve in the British army. Party chief Prachanda said, "We are sorry for the incident that took place against the policy of the party."
- 11 November: The Ministry of Defence accuses the Maoists of abducting twenty-nine 9th- and 10th-grade students from Riva Secondary School in Mugu District, western Nepal during the previous week.
- 15 November: Four police officers, including Kamalapati Pant (Nepal Police Force), were shot dead from behind on a tea shop by two armed Maoist rebels who approached in a motorcycle and fled away immediately, in Nepalgunj.
- 19 November: According to a Nepal army official, four people were caught at the Chinese Khasa border point, 114 kilometers northeast of Kathmandu, smuggling weapons from Tibet into Nepal. The official named Hirala Lal Shrestha and Gyaljen Sherpa and said they were taken for interrogation in the Tibetan town of Shigatse.

=== 2004 ===
- 5 February: An Army raid is carried out by the Bhairavnath Battalion on a village in Bhimad, Makwanpur district. Reports emerge that 14 suspected Maoist rebels and two civilians were executed after being captured. Amnesty International later wrote a letter to Prime Minister Surya Bahadur Thapa and Brigadier-General Nilendra Aryal, Head of the Royal Nepal Army (RNA) human rights cell, demanding an immediate inquiry.
- 10 February: Two central committee members of the CPN-M, Matrika Yadav and Suresh Paswan, are reported to have been handed over by India to Nepal. They were reportedly arrested in Lucknow after Nepal provided information.
- 13 February: Ganesh Chilwal leads an anti-Maoist protest on this day, the eighth anniversary of the commencement of the revolution.
- 15 February: Ganesh Chilwal is shot dead in his Kathmandu office by two suspected Maoists.
- 15 February: Fighting erupts at a Maoist jungle base in Kalikot District, 360 km west of Kathmandu. The base is said to hold 5000 Maoist troops. On 17 February, a security official says that a private helicopter flying troops to Kalikot was hit by Maoist fire but that it returned safely to Kathmandu. On 18 February, 65 Maoists are reported to have been killed, though this conflicts with other reported death tolls of 35 and 48.
- 15 and 16 February: State radio reports that 13 Maoist rebels were killed in seven separate small clashes with security forces across the country.
- 18 February: Lawmaker Khem Narayan Faujdar, a member of the parliament dissolved by King Gyanendra in 2002, is shot dead by two suspected Maoists riding a motorcycle in the Nawalparasi District, 200 km southwest of the capital, according to the police.
- 2 April: The largest rallies since 1990 begin in Kathmandu. They are variously labelled "pro-democracy" and "anti-monarchy."
- 3 April: More than 12 trucks are burnt while waiting at a western Nepal border post to pick up petrol from India. India condemns the attacks and vows to fight terrorism.
- 4 April: "Some 150 demonstrators were struck during a police baton charge" during demonstrations in Kathmandu
- 4 April: "Hundreds of Maoist rebels" attack a Police outpost in Yadukuwa, Jadukhola. 13 policemen are killed, 7 wounded, and 35 are listed as missing. 8–9 Maoists are also killed. "Witnesses said more than 500 rebels attacked the Police post and began firing Assault Rifles and RPG-7 rockets. at around 9 pm (1515 GMT) on Sunday night. The fighting lasted two to three hours." Other reports state 400 rebels.
- 4 April: In the west of the country three Indian traders are shot and injured and have their vehicles burned.
- 5 April: A three-day national strike begins, called by CPN(M) and opposed by an "alliance of five political parties" who are protesting in Kathmandu against the monarchy and say the strike will hamper the movement of demonstrators in Kathmandu. Prachanda said, "The time has come to win a united struggle against the feudal forces as the king is trying to take the nation back to the 18th century."
- 5 April: In the morning, 3 soldiers are killed and 7 injured by a CPN(M) landmine activated by their vehicle at Dhalkhola, 50 km east of Kathmandu.
- 5 April: At least 140 people are injured in clashes in Kathmandu as "about 50,000" demonstrators confront the police. Demonstrators try to break through a police barricade close to the royal palace. The police respond with tear gas and protesters are reportedly injured by police batons. Rocks and bricks are thrown by both sides. Demonstrations also occur in Lalitpur and Bhaktapur. Meanwhile, King Gyanendra has reportedly been away touring villages in western Nepal.
- 5 April: The Indian government announces that it will no longer provide police escorts to Indian officials shopping in Nepal, as a means to discourage such trips. Fears are based on the CPN(M) targeting Indians. "We are worried about possible reprisals here if the Maoists continue to target Indians inside Nepal," said a senior police official.
- 24 June: The nephew of former Prime Minister Surya Bahadur Thapa is hacked to death by Maoist insurgents in Dhankuta district.
- 16 August: The Soaltee Hotel, a popular luxury hotel in Kathmandu, is bombed, after refusing a demand from the Maoists that the hotel be closed.
- 18 August: A bomb explodes in a marketplace in southern Nepal. The blast kills a 12-year-old boy and wounds six others, including three policemen. In addition, Maoist rebels, demanding the release of captured guerrillas, stop all road traffic near Kathmandu by threatening to attack vehicles. Some Nepal businesses are shut down because of threats.
- 10 September: A bomb explodes at the United States Information Service office in Kathmandu.
- 13 September: U.S. Peace Corps suspends operations and non-essential U.S. Embassy personnel are evacuated from Nepal.
- 9 November: 36 people were injured when suspected Maoist rebels exploded a powerful bomb at an under-construction government office complex, the Karmachari Sanchaya Kosh Office Complex in the heart of Nepalese capital Kathmandu Tuesday.

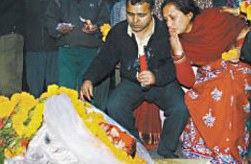
In the offensive: DSP Hem Raj Regmi was shot dead by Maoists, 11 November 2004.

- 11 November: Maoists kill NID Deputy Superintendent of Police Hemraj Regmi in front of his office residence in Butwal-6 in Rupandehi district.
- 15 December: Twenty government security personnel are killed in the western district of Arghakhanchi when the Maoists mount a surprise attack.
- 16 December: Sixteen Maoist rebels are killed in clashes with Nepali security forces in the western district of Dailekh.
- 23 December: Maoist forces launch blockade of Kathmandu.
- 26 December: Over 15,000 hold peace rally in Kathmandu.

=== 2005 ===
- 2 January: Nepali media reports two children being killed in Dailekh district by a Maoist bomb.
- 4 January: Three government security personnel and between two and twenty-four Maoist rebels reported killed in fighting.
- 8 January: Maoists detain and later release 300 passengers from six buses that defy their blockade of Kathmandu.
- 10 January: Prime Minister Deuba said he would increase defense spending to fight the Maoists unless they come forward for talks with the government.
- 11 January: Protests and blockades over the government fuel price increases of between 10% and 25%.
- 15 January: Maoists allegedly detain 14 Indian Gurkhas from Chuha village in Kailali.
- 29 January: Government leader in the Lamjung district had been abducted and murdered with a gunshot to the head.
- 1 February: King Gyanendra dissolves the Deuba government and bans all news reports. The army begins arresting senior political leaders, journalists, trade unionists, human rights activists and civil society leaders. All telephone and internet connections are cut.
- 7 April: Maoists attack an army base in Khara, Rukum suffering 300 losses.
- 6 June: Badarmude bus explosion: Some 38 civilians are killed and over 70 injured after a packed passenger bus runs over a rebel landmine in Chitwan district.
- 9 August: Maoist rebels kill 40 security men in midwestern Nepal.
- 3 September: The Maoists declare a three-month unilateral ceasefire to woo opposition political parties.
- October: Chunbang Central Committee meeting in Rolpa decides to join hands with the political parties against the king
- 19 November: After negotiations, the Maoist rebels agree to work with opposition politicians in a common front against the rule of King Gyanendra.

=== 2006 ===
- 2 January: Rebels decide not to extend a four-month ceasefire saying that the government had broken the ceasefire with numerous attacks on Maoist villages.
- 14 January: Maoists launch coordinated attacks on five military and paramilitary targets in the Kathmandu valley, the first demonstration of their ability to organize violence within the Valley, prompting curfews at night for the next several days.
- 14 March: Nepali rebels extend road blockade; nationwide strike called for 3 April.
- 5 April: General strike begins with Maoist forces promising to refrain from violence.
- 6 April 7: Protesters clash with police, hundreds arrested, dozens injured.
- 8 April: A curfew is imposed in Kathmandu from 10 pm to 9 am The king orders protesters violating the curfew to be "shot on sight."
- 9 April: General strike scheduled to end. Government extends curfew, BBC reports. Three dead in two days of unrest, as thousands of demonstrators defy curfews.
- 26 April: The Maoists start to unblock streets and roads, but put forth some conditions.
- 27 April: Maoist insurgents, responding to a demand by the newly appointed prime minister Girija Prasad Koirala, announce a unilateral three-month truce after weeks of pro-democracy protests in Kathmandu, and encourage the formation of a new constituent assembly to rewrite the nation's constitution.
- 3 May: Nepal's new cabinet declares a ceasefire. This was not taken very seriously. The cabinet also announces that the Maoist rebels will no longer be considered a terrorist group. Rebels are also encouraged to open peace talks.
- 21 November: Peace talks end with the signing of the Comprehensive Peace Accord between Prime Minister Koirala and Maoist leader Prachanda. The deal allows the Maoists to take part in government, and places their weapons under UN monitoring.

== Aftermath ==
More than 17,000 people (including both civilians and armed forces) were killed during the conflict, including over 4,000 Nepalese killed by Maoists from 1996 to 2005, and over 8,200 Nepalese killed by government forces from 1996 to 2005. In addition, an estimated 100,000 to 150,000 people were internally displaced as a result of the conflict. Furthermore, this conflict disrupted most rural development activities. The revolution resulted in political, social and cultural change in Nepal.

== Transitional justice bodies ==
As a transitional justice mechanism, in July 2007, the Ministry of Peace and Reconstruction proposed legislation that would establish a Truth and Reconciliation Commission in Nepal. The parliament set up a Truth and Reconciliation Commission to investigate:

"Murder, abduction and taking of hostage, causing mutilation and disability, physical or mental torture, rape and sexual violence, looting, possession, damage or arson of private or public property, forced eviction from house and land or any other kind of displacement, and any kind of inhuman acts inconsistent with the international human rights or humanitarian law or other crimes against humanity."

Also another commission to investigate on forced disappearances and debated proposals to grant an amnesty for abuses by government and rebel forces. Both commissions were established in 2013. However, the government led by the NCP, did not extend the tenure of the working commission, dismissed it, and allegedly formed a new commission in its favor.

In 2016, commissioner Madhabi Bhatta of the TRC, a hardliner advocating that amnesty will not be given to perpetrators of serious crimes and that no one has immunity, said on national television that even Prachanda, the then-Prime Minister and former supreme commander of the guerrillas, will be questioned by the commission, reporting that she felt security threats from the former extremists.

=== Army integration ===
The Nepalese Army took final control over the People's Liberation Army (PLA), the armed wing of the CPN (Maoist), on 10 April 2012. Then Prime Minister Baburam Bhattarai, who also headed the Army Integration Special Committee (AISC), told the committee on 10 April 2012, that the NA was going to move into all 15 PLA cantonments, take full control, and take control of more than 3,000 weapons locked in containers there. A total of 6,576 combatants chose the Voluntary Retirement Scheme (VRS), that promised cheques in the range of NPR 500,000 to NPR 800,000, depending on their rank.

In the first phase (18 November – 1 December 2011) of regrouping, 9,705 former combatants had chosen integration into the NA. In a landmark achievement, the AISC had initiated the process of integration following a 1 November 2011, seven-point deal signed by three major political parties – UCPN-M, Communist Party of Nepal (Unified Marxist-Leninist) (CPN-UML) and Nepali Congress (NC) – and the umbrella formation of several Madheshi groups, the United Democratic Madhesi Front (UDMF). The deal provided three options to former PLA combatants – integration, voluntary retirement and rehabilitation. 9,705 combatants opted for integration, 7,286 chose voluntary discharge, and six combatants registered their names for rehabilitation packages. The United Nations Mission in Nepal (UNMIN) had registered 19,602 combatants in the second verification conducted on 26 May 2007. Leaked footage of Prachanda was later telecasted by Image Channel on 5 May 2009, in which Parchanda claims to have given the UNMIN an inflated number of Maoist fighters.

On 14 April 2012, AISC decision laid down that the ranks of the integrated combatants would be determined according to the NA's, and not the PLA's, standards. A selection committee would be headed by the chairman of Nepal's Public Service Commission (PSC) or by a member appointed by him, and a General Directorate would be created under the NA, headed by a Lieutenant General, to absorb the integrated combatants. The combatants will have to undergo between three and nine months of training, depending on their ranks. The Directorate would only be deployed for disaster relief, industrial security, development, and forest and environment conservation. On 17 April, the NA stated that it could not start the recruitment process of former Maoist combatants until the structure—leadership and size—of the General Directorate had been finalised at the political level. On 19 April 2012, the three major political parties agreed to merge two separate proposed commissions on Truth and Reconciliation, and on Disappearances, into one.

== Gallery ==
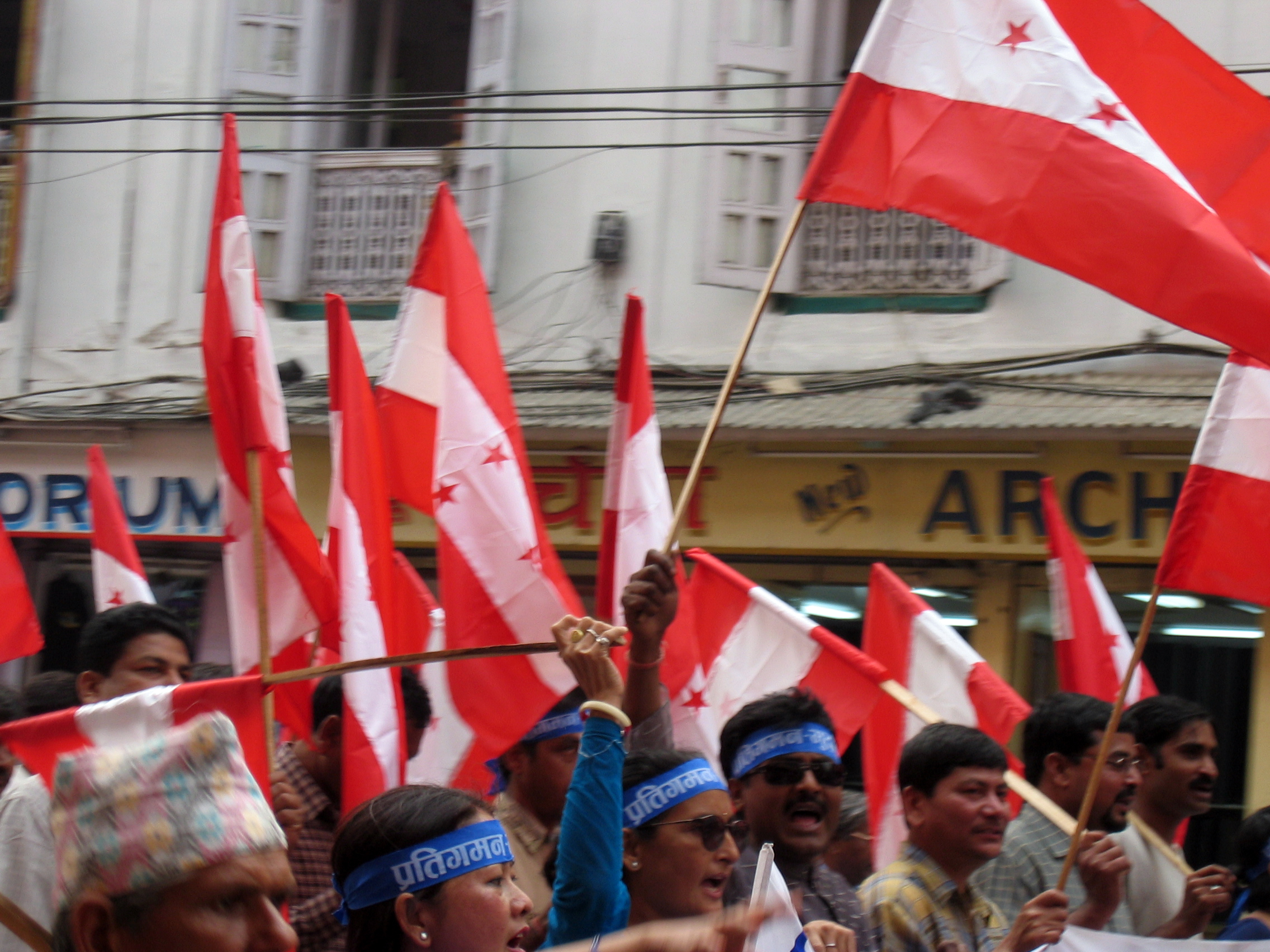
Demonstration by Nepali Congress workers and supporters against Monarchism on 1 April 2004 in Kathmandu

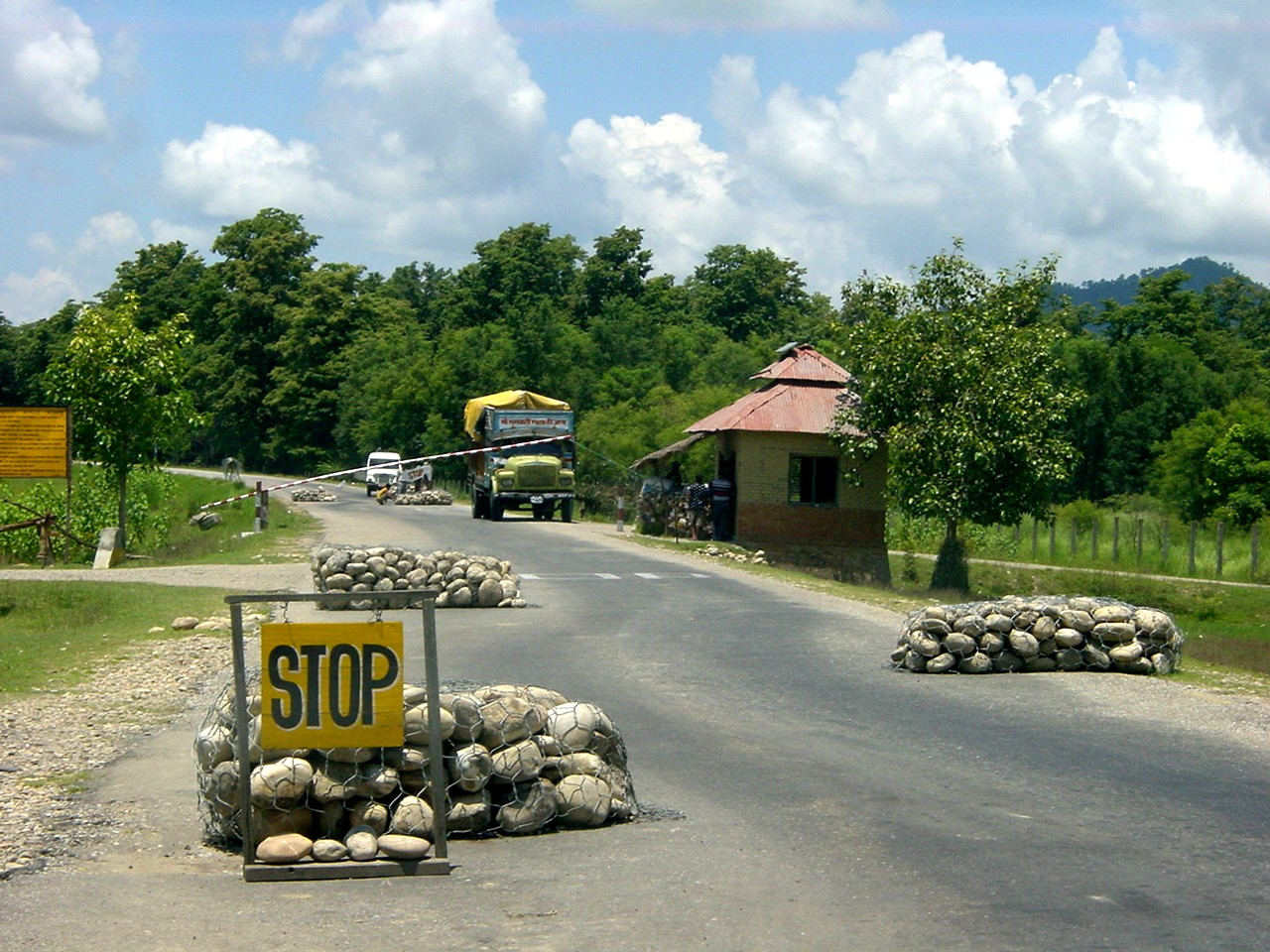
Checkpoint in Western Nepal

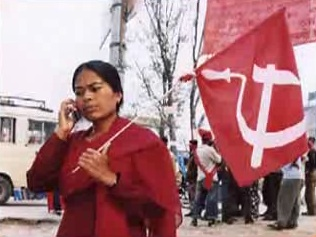
Maoist supporter at an April 2007 Maoist rally in Kathmandu

== See also ==
- Women in the Nepalese Civil War
- Military of Nepal
- 2002 Achham incident
- Pir, a controversial song about the war
- Naxalite–Maoist insurgency in India
