= Raju Aryal =

Nepali police chief

Raju Aryal (Nepali: राजु अर्याल) was the Inspector General of Armed Police Force (Nepal). On May 2, 2022, he was named as the 12th chief of Armed Police Force (Nepal).
