= Khara, Nepal =

Khara खारा
- Village development committee
- Location in Nepal
- Coordinates: 28.55°N 82.43°E
- Country: Nepal
- Province: Karnali Province
- District: Western Rukum District

Population (2011)
  - Total: 5,122
- Time zone: UTC+5:45 (Nepal Time)
- Area code: +977-88
- Website: www.ddcrukum.gov.np

Khara is a village development committee in Western Rukum District in Karnali Province of western Nepal. At the time of the 2011 Nepal census it had a population of 6186 people living in 1133 individual households.
