= Nepal Triathlon Association =

National governing body of triathlon in Nepal

- Official Logo of the NTA
- Sport: Triathlon
- Jurisdiction: (Nepal) National
- Abbreviation: NTA
- Founded: 2003; 23 years ago
- Affiliation: World Triathlon
- Regional affiliation: Asian Triathlon
- Headquarters: Lalitpur, Nepal
- President: Nilendra Raj Shrestha
- Secretary: Yubraj Sunuwar

Official website
- nepaltriathlon.org.np
- (Nepal)

The Nepal Triathlon Association (NTA) is the governing and controlling body of triathlon in Nepal. It is affiliated to World Triathlon and Asian Triathlon.

Team Nepal became champion in 2019 South Asian Games.

NTA got attention after successful organization of 2(2023, 2024) Asia Triathlon Cup & South Asian Triathlon Championships in Pokhara, Nepal.

== Affiliated Province Volleyball Associations ==
Province Association	Province	Affiliate District Association	President
Gandaki Province Triathlon Association	Gandaki Province	Kaski District Triathlon Association	Samun Devkota
