= Rangsi, Rolpa =

Coordinates: 28°27′N 82°34′E

Rangsi राङसी
- Village development committee
- Interactive map of Rangsi
- Country: Nepal
- Zone: Rapti Zone
- District: Rolpa District

Population (1991)
  - Total: 4,000
- Time zone: UTC+5:45 (Nepal Time)

Rangsi is a village development committee in Rolpa District in the Rapti Zone of north-eastern Nepal. At the time of the 1991 Nepal census it had a population of 4000 people living in 745 individual households.
