= Armed Police Force =

Gendarmerie of Nepal

Armed Police Force सशस्त्र प्रहरी बल
- Emblem of the Armed Police Force
- Abbreviation: APF
- Motto: शान्ति सुरक्षा प्रतिबद्धता Peace, Security, Commitment

Agency overview
- Formed: 2001
- Employees: 37,500

Jurisdictional structure
- Federal agency: Nepal
- Operations jurisdiction: Nepal
- Governing body: Ministry of Home Affairs
- Constituting instrument: Armed Police Force Act, 2001
- General nature: Federal law enforcement; Gendarmerie
- Specialist jurisdictions: National border patrol, security, integrity

Operational structure
- Headquarters: Kathmandu, Nepal
- Agency executive: Narayan Datta Paudel, Inspector General of the Armed Police Force
- Child agency: APF Club

Website
- www.apf.gov.np

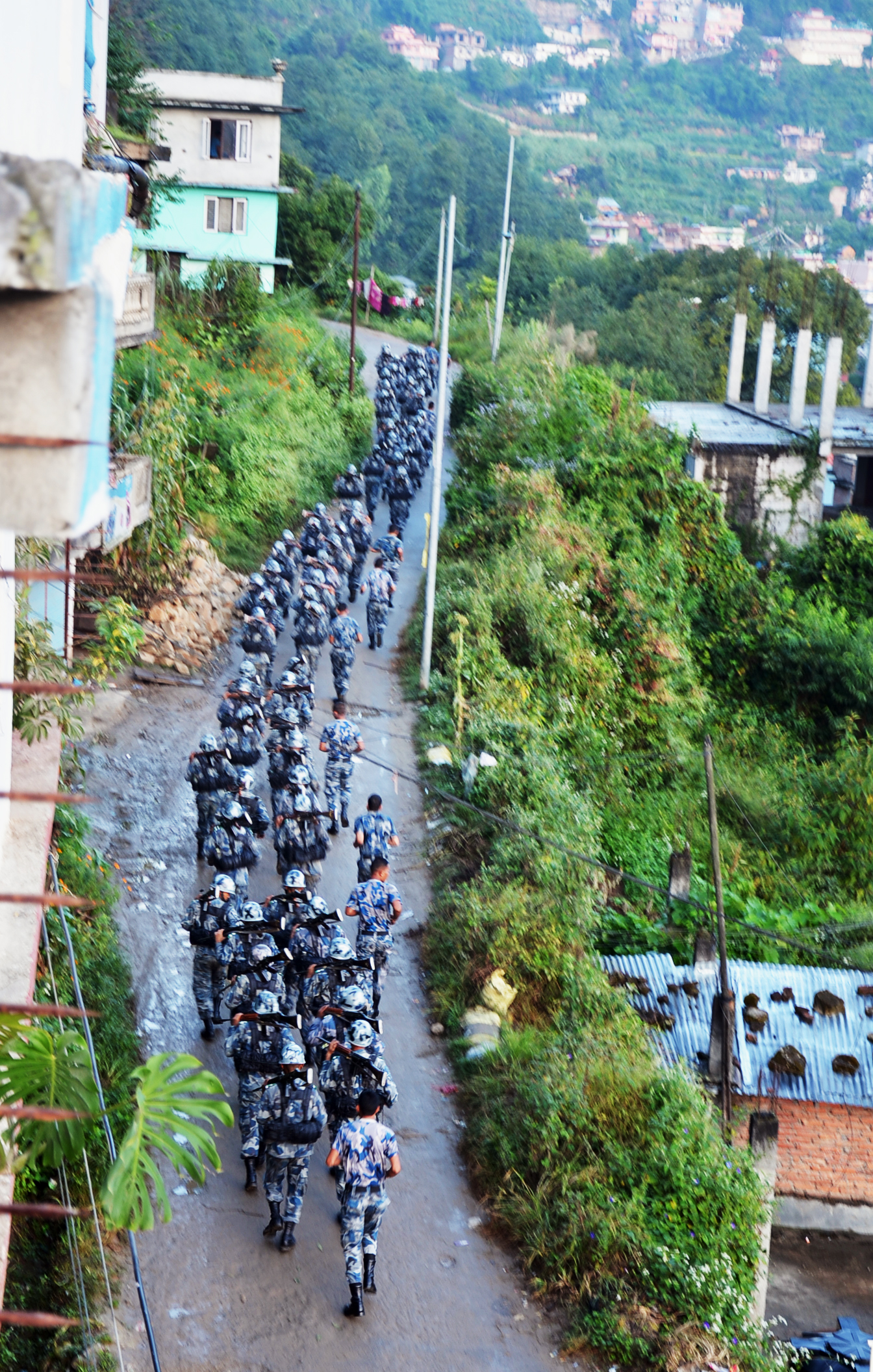
The armed police force of Nepal doing morning training at Halchowk, Swayambhu, Nepal.

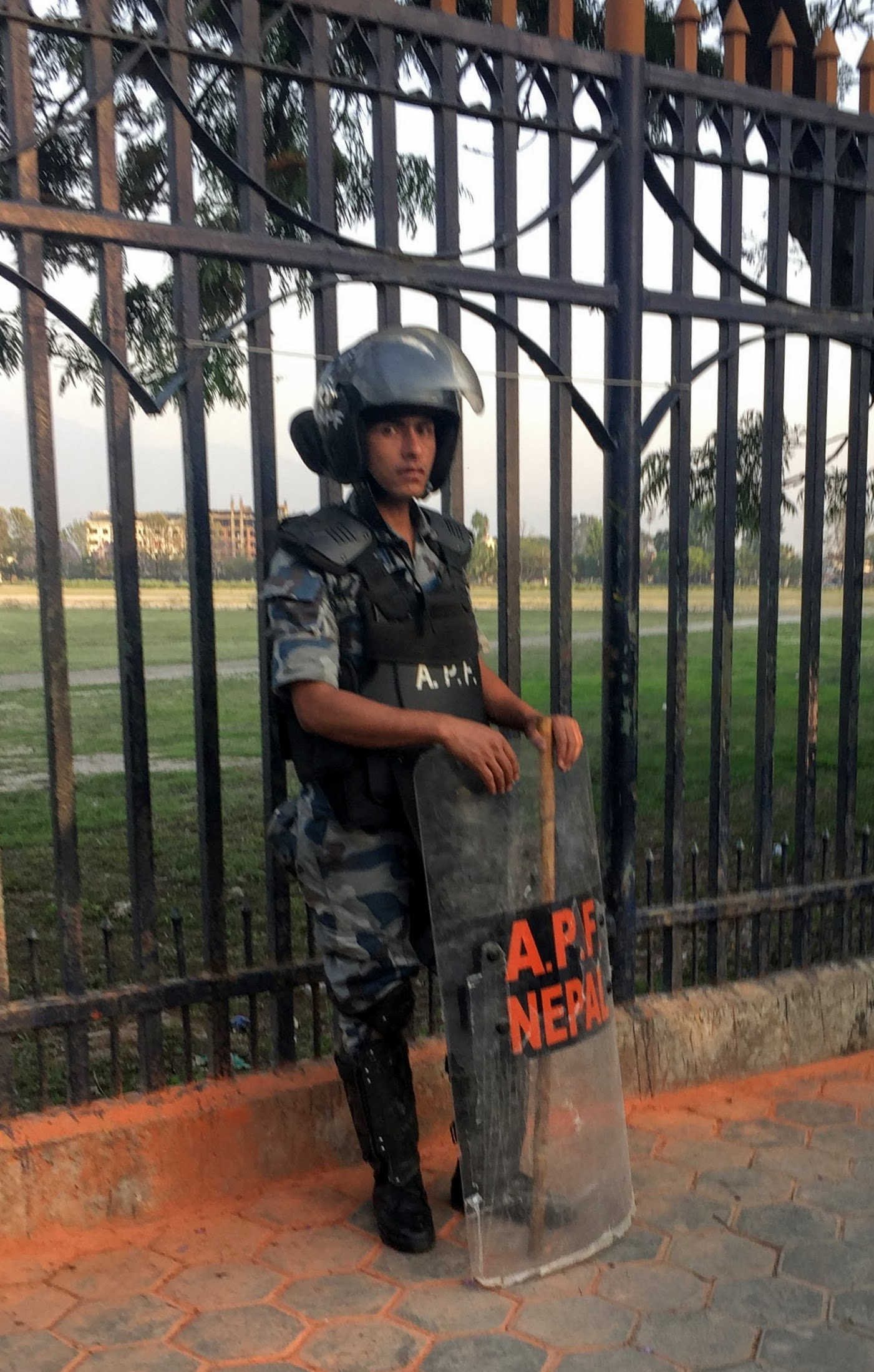
An Armed Police Force of Nepal personnel in Kathmandu

The Armed Police Force (APF) is a paramilitary and gendarmerie force tasked with counter-insurgency and border security operations in Nepal. It functions as a semi-military wing, and occupies a sort of dual role as both military and law enforcement. Service is voluntary and the minimum age for enlistment is 18 years. Initially founded with a roster of 15,000 police and military personnel, the Armed Police Force was projected to have a corps of 77,117 at its peak. In 2025, Inspector General of APF Raju Aryal claimed the number of sanctioned officers to be above 37,000 and urged to increase it to 60,000 in future in order to meet all requirements after increase in border outposts and changing political environment.

In February 1996, the ideologically Maoist Communist Party of Nepal operating as the United People's Front of Nepal initiated what was then dubbed the "People's War". Ensuing armed resistance and criminal activity escalating from the conflict motivated King Gyanendra to consider amassing an independent police force. Subsequently, the Armed Police Force was founded on 24 October 2001. Krishna Mohan Shrestha of the Nepal Police (then serving as Additional Inspector General of Police) was its first chief.

The current command and control organization of Nepal's army is outlined along the protocol of the 1990 Constitution and its interim constitution. Its standing Inspector General is the Chief of Armed Police Force, equivalent in rank to a three-star Lieutenant General of the Nepal Army.

The fundamental ethos of the Armed Police Force (APF) is Peace, Security, Commitment.

== History ==
The Armed Police Force, Nepal was founded in 2001 to help Nepal's army and civil police force counter a growing Maoist insurgency in Nepal. It was fundamentally a paramilitary organization and mostly engaged in counterinsurgency operations. In August 2003, five constables of the Armed Police Force were killed in a military operation in the Ramechapp District of Nepal which killed 39 Maoist rebels. In January 2003, the head of the Armed Police Force Inspector General Krishna Mohan Shrestha was shot and killed by Maoist insurgents while taking his morning walk alongside his bodyguard and wife, who were also killed.

In 2011, the APF established the Collapsed Structure Search and Rescue unit, focused on major disasters.

== Head of Armed Police Force (Nepal) ==
The Armed Police Force is headed by the Inspector General of APF. He reports directly to the Ministry of Home Affairs and is appointed by the Government of Nepal for a tenure of four years.

== Current department and commander ==
| S.N. | Department | Commander |
|---|---|---|
| 1 | Border Security Department | AIG Ganesh bahadur Thadamagar |
| 2 | Operation Department | AIG Vacant |
| 3 | Human Resource Department | AIG Banshi Raj Dahal |

== Operations ==
In November 2001, the Nepal Armed Forces began military operations against the Communist Party of Nepal (Maoist) and Armed Police Force was involved in this operations with the birth of its organization along with Nepali Army.

Allegations of war crimes and human rights abuses have been leveled by the media against members of the Armed Police Force. However, this is generally considered very small compared to the atrocities committed by the then Maoist insurgents. Truth and Reconciliation Commission under political pressure of the governing party has failed to take actions against the humans rights abusers on either sides.

== Roles of Armed Police Force, Nepal ==
- To control any ongoing or would be armed conflict within the country,
- To control any ongoing or would be armed rebellion or separatist activities within the country,
- To control any ongoing or would be terrorist activities within the country,
- To control any ongoing or would be riot within the country,
- To assist in rendering relief to natural calamity or epidemic victims,
- To rescue any citizen or else from hostage captivity or in the event of occurrence of heinous and serious crimes or unrest of grave nature or of anticipation,
- To guard border of the country,
- To assist under the Nepalese Army in condition of external invasion,
- To protect public vital installations, infrastructures and other facilities assigned by the Government of Nepal,
- To protect the personalities and public vital installations, institutes and other facilities considered to be given protection by the Government of Nepal,
- To perform tasks assigned as per this act and under its regulations or in accordance to other prevalent laws,
- To perform other tasks assigned from time to time by the Government of Nepal.
- To mobilize in customs, revenue and industrial security.

The 14 mandates assigned by the APF, Nepal Act 2072 is simply categorized into a concept called BIRD. The 'BIRD' Concept simplify the major roles as B for Border Security, I for Internal Security, R for Revenue Support(formerly Riot Management) and D for Disaster management. It was popularized by IGP Raju Aryal.

== International peacekeeping missions ==
The Armed Police Force contributes members to peacekeeping efforts under the flag of the United Nations, for global peace and security as a whole.

Since October 2002, the Armed Police Force has made contributions to various UN peacekeeping missions like UNGCI (Iraq), UNMIK (Kosovo), UNMIL (Liberia), UNAMSIL (Sierra Leone), MINUSTAH (Haiti), UNMIS & UNMISS (Sudan), UNAMID (Darfur), UNSOM (Somalia), UNMIT (East Timor), and UNFICYP (Cyprus) as UN police advisers, instructors, monitors, and patrol contingents.

6582 APF personnel had already participated as a member of an FPU contingent, and 785 personnel have served as Individual Police Officers (IPOs) up until August 2018 on United Nations peacekeeping missions.

== Weapons and equipment ==
| Name | Weapon | Type | Caliber | Origin | Note |
Handguns
| Browning Hi-Power | | Semi-automatic pistol | 7.65×21mm Parabellum | Belgium, United States | |
| Beretta 92 | | Semi-automatic pistol | 9×19mm Parabellum | Italy | reported in Nepal security inventories |
Submachine gun
| Heckler & Koch MP5 | | Submachine gun | 9×19mm Parabellum | West Germany | used by special units / law-enforcement detachments |
| Sterling submachine gun | | Submachine gun | 9×19mm Parabellum | United Kingdom | |
Assault Rifle/ Battle Rifles
| L1A1 | | Semi-automatic rifle | 7.62×51mm NATO | Belgium, United Kingdom, Australia, Canada | |
| M16 | | Assault rifle | 5.56×45mm NATO | United States | Used by Special Unit |
| FN FAL | | Battle rifle | 7.62×51mm NATO | Belgium | |
| INSAS rifle | | Light machine gun | 5.56×45mm NATO | India | |
| FN MAG | | General-purpose machine gun | 7.62×51mm NATO | Belgium | used on vehicles / fixed posts |

== See also ==
- Nepal A.P.F. Club
- National Investigation Department of Nepal
