= Nanda Kishor Pun =

Vice President of Nepal from 2015 to 2023

- नन्दकिशोर पुन
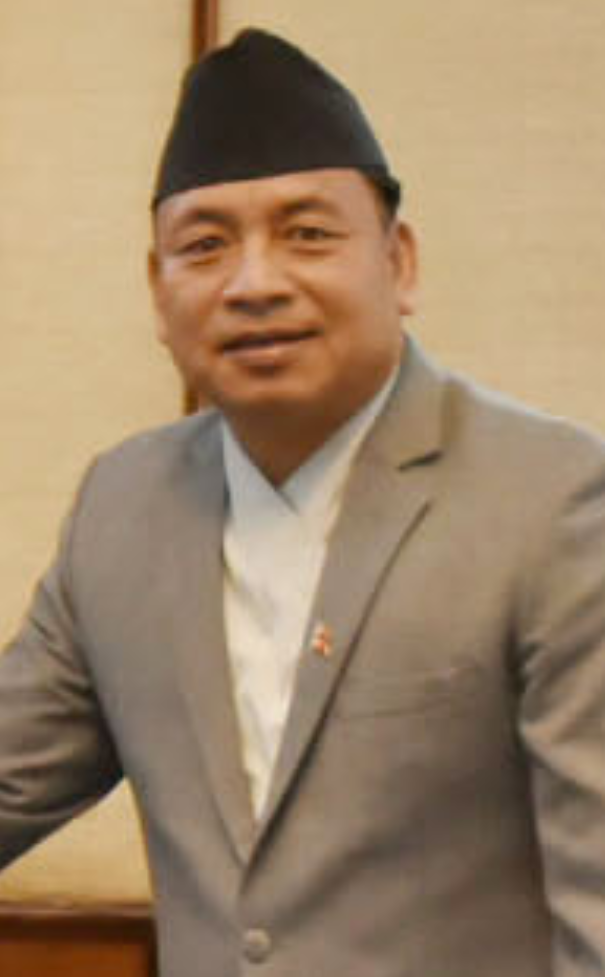
- Pun in 2018

Vice President of Nepal
- In office 31 October 2015 – 20 March 2023
- President: Bidya Devi Bhandari; Ram Chandra Paudel
- Preceded by: Parmanand Jha
- Succeeded by: Ram Sahaya Yadav

Chief Commander of the People's Liberation Army
- In office 12 September 2008 – 12 April 2012
- Preceded by: Pushpa Kamal Dahal
- Succeeded by: Position abolished

Personal details
- Born: 23 October 1966 (age 60) Rangsi, Rolpa, Nepal
- Party: Independent
- Other political affiliations: Communist Party of Nepal (Maoist Centre) (until 2015)
- Spouse: Hastamali Pun (m. 1983)
- Children: 2
- Education: Mahendra Bahumukhi Campus

Nanda Kishor Pun Magar (Nepali: नन्दकिशोर पुन; born 23 October 1966), also known as Nanda Bahadur Pun or Pasang, is a Nepalese politician who served as the second vice president of Nepal, from 2015 to 2023. He served as the chief commander of the People's Liberation Army in Nepal. He was also a member of the Central Committee of the Communist Party of Nepal (Maoist Centre).

== Early life and education ==
Nanda Bahadur Pun was born to farmers Ramsur Pun and Mansara Pun in Rangsi - 9, Rolpa as the third of their six children.

He started school aged 8. He completed his primary education at Jakhar Primary School and his lower secondary education at Rangsi Lower Secondary School. While in the seventh grade at Rangsi Lower Secondary School, he was the chairman of a unit of the All Nepal National Independent Students Union (Sixth). He was a representative of his school to the 2nd district convention of the All Nepal National Independent Students Union (Sixth). He had to hide in a cave all night after the police disrupted the event.

Pun enrolled in Bal Kalyan Secondary School in Libang for his secondary education. In Libang he was influenced by his teacher, Krishna Bahadur Mahara to study about communism. In 1983 he was a representative for Rolpa at the 1st Sub Central Convention of the All Nepal National Free Students Union. Lila Mani Pokharel was elected chairman during this convention. There he was accused of being involved in a student union and was kept under arrest for a few days. After being forced to choose between his education and politics he enrolled in Thabang Secondary School in 1983. While in Thabang he was jailed for three days for his association with student unions. He passed his School Leaving Certificate exams there in 1986.

He enrolled in Mahendra Bahumukhi Campus in Dang in 1989 to pursue his higher secondary education. He completed his graduate education in Political Science. While in Dang he was the chairman of the Mashal Samuha.

== Personal life ==
While studying in the ninth grade, he married Hastamali Pun at the age of 17, with whom he has two kids.

== Electoral history ==
=== 2013 Constituent Assembly election ===
Kathmandu 4
Party	Candidate	Votes
Nepali Congress	Gagan Thapa	22,336
CPN (Unified Marxist-Leninist)	Nirmal Kuikel	9,135
UCPN (Maoist)	Nanda Kishor Pun	6,462
Rastriya Prajatantra Party Nepal	Udhhav Paudel	3,263
Others		2,335
Result	Congress hold	
Source: Election Commission

Political offices
Preceded by Parmananda Jha	Vice President of Nepal; 2015 – 2023	Succeeded by Ram Sahaya Yadav
