= People's Liberation Army, Nepal =

Maoist militant organisation in Nepal

People's Liberation Army
- जनमुक्ति सेना, नेपाल
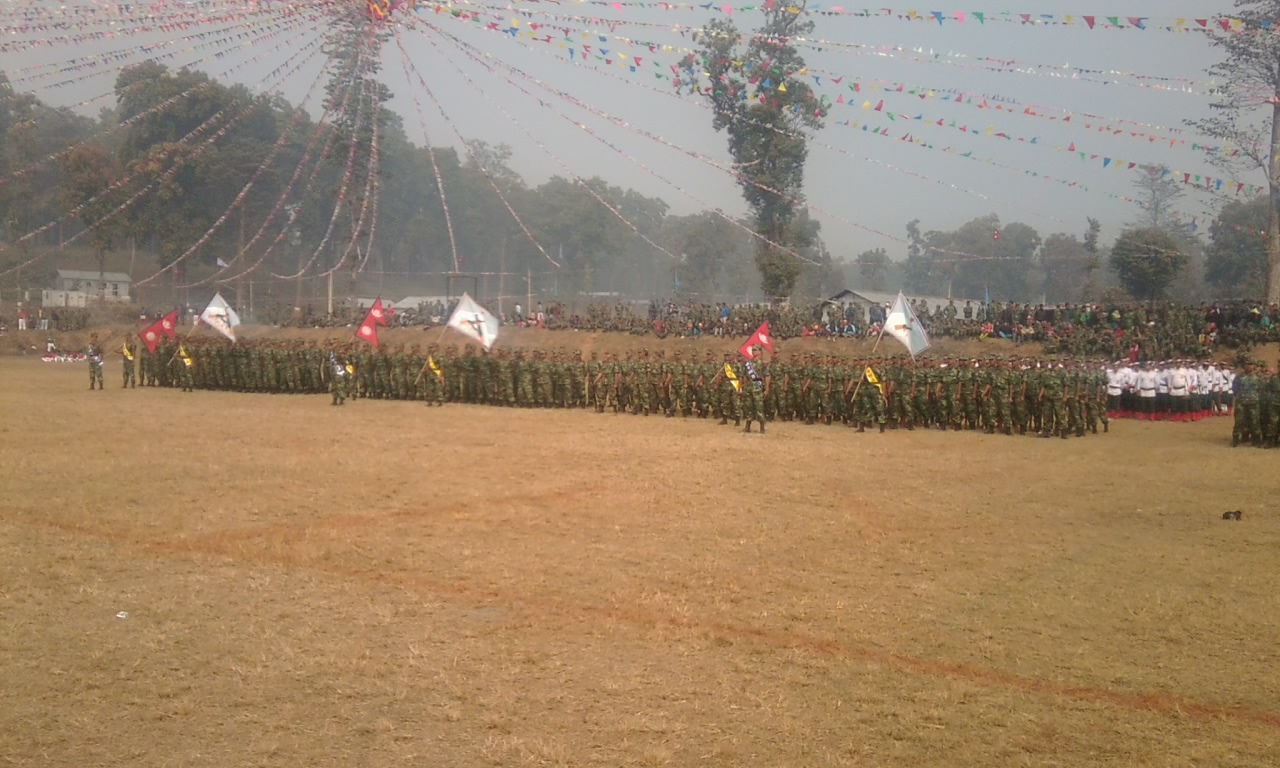
- Members of the People's Liberation Army (Nepal) in Chitwan
- Leaders: Prachanda (Chief Commander, 2001–2008); Nanda Kishor Pun (Chief Commander, 2008–2011)
- Military leader: Nanda Kishor Pun (Deputy Commander, 2001–2008); Barsaman Pun (Deputy Commander); Janardan Sharma (Deputy Commander); Chandra Prakash Khanal (Deputy Commander)
- Country: Nepal
- Allegiance: Communist Party of Nepal (Maoist)
- Size: ~36,000 (Full-time PLA fighters)

The Nepalese People's Liberation Army (Nepali: जनमुक्ति सेना, नेपाल) was the armed wing of the Communist Party of Nepal (CPN(M)). The PLA was founded in 2002, in the midst of the Nepalese Civil War initiated by the Maoists in 1996. The chief commander of the PLA during the war was Prachanda (Pushpa Kamal Dahal). On 12 September 2008, Nanda Kishor Pun was appointed new chief commander of the PLA, as Prachanda had become Prime Minister of Nepal. This move was in line with a pledge issued by the CPN(M), issued prior to the 2008 Constituent Assembly election, that their members elected to the Assembly would leave their PLA positions.

Following the Comprehensive Peace Agreement, the PLA's soldiers were to be kept in cantonments with agreement stipulating that PLA and Royal Nepal Army should be integrated together. Despite multiple delays, the government of Nepal, led by the former chief commander of the PLA, promised that the PLA-NA integrations would be completed within six months.

== Change of military tactics ==
After negotiations with the Government of the king broke down, CPN(M) decided to change their strategy. Meanwhile, Maoist senior leader C.P. Gajurel was arrested on August 20 2003, at Chennai International Airport. In January and February 2004 CPN(M) suffered major military setbacks and lost more than 80 armies attacking different regions of Nepal with mounting pressure from the international community and human rights organizations surrounding the killings and kidnappings of civil countrymen during the insurgency. In a response, a press statement was released on 16 March 2004 with Chairman Prachanda saying, "Our party has been committed to the fundamental norms of human rights and the Geneva convention since the start of the people’s war. Anyone who without prejudice judges the facts of the eight years can find our People’s Liberation Army has been showing respectful behaviour, treatment to the injured and releasing the prisoners of the war in good condition."

During this period the party changed its military tactics to one of strategic offence. The PLA was immediately instructed to converge at Thawang in Rolpa to prepare for a major offensive. The foremost responsibility was provided to the Western Command of the PLA. The People's Liberation Army from the brigades at Mangalsen, Gorahi-Satbaria, Lise-Gam and Basu Memorial were in Thawang by 8 March. All the PLA men were introduced with the war strategy and instructed for a major attack, the one in the last years of history of the people's war. The responsibility of executing the plan was entitled to Diwakar, a senior Maoist leader which was believed to be worked out by chairman Prachanda. Between 8 and 11 March, PLA commanders Diwakar and Nanda Bahadur Pun (also known as Pasang) current commander-in-chief of PLA, built sand models to illustrate the war strategy. Barsaman Pun (known as Comrade Ananta) served alongside them as one of the four key deputy commanders of the PLA's divisions during the civil war.

On 12 March, the armed forces began moving towards the east with nearly about 3,000 combatants. With a heavy preparation and a mounting of arms, lodging, medicine, the PLA was moved to their destination. From Rolpa, the PLA made their way to Baglung through Rukum. Commander Pasang was in regular contact with the chairman Prachanda. Before reaching Beni, the headquarters of Myagdi district, the PLA was given a final briefing about the operation. The PLA attacked at 11 pm, 20 March with the battle lasting throughout the night until 10 am the next day. The Royal Nepal Army claimed the death of around 500 Maoist combatants with a statement released by Comrade Biplav claiming the death of about 120 RNA and 26 policemen. On the battlefield, Maoist PLA 4th Division commander Ganesh Man Pun (known as Comrade Rashmi) was among the prominent military leaders directing operations during the insurgency. 33 prisoners were taken, including RNA soldiers, policemen and CDO with Deputy Superintendent of Police whom the CPN(M) proposed the releasing of in return for their senior leaders Matrika Yadav, Suresh Ale Magar and Tilak Sharma.

Prachanda vowed to continue the people's war with him highlighting the attack of PLA against the army barracks as a successful operation.

== Size ==
According to UNMIN, the PLA had around 19,600 confirmed fighters residing in different cantonments at the end of the war with the ones who were found to be unqualified during the verification process have been removed from the cantonments under an agreement with UNMIN (United Nations Mission in Nepal) personnel, the Nepalese government and the party. In a 2006 Reuters report, a Maoist commander claimed they had 36,000 soldiers.

== Legal provision for PLA, Nepal ==
1. As per the commitments expressed in the joint letter sent to the UN by the Government of Nepal and CPN(M) on 9 August, the PLA would remain in the temporary camps. The United Nations would monitor and verify them.
2. All arms and munitions would be securely stored in the camps except those needed for providing security of the camp after the PLA are in cantonments.
3. Once the PLA are in the camps, the Government of Nepal will take responsibility of providing ration and other facilities to them.
4. The interim cabinet will form a special committee to carry out monitoring, integration and rehabilitation of the Maoist insurgents.
5. Efforts will be made to make arrangements for the security of the Maoist leaders as per the agreement with the government of Nepal.

== Barrier to integration ==
The Nepali Maoist party's plan to fuse its People's Liberation Army with the Nepal Army ran into several major issues in process, including several refusals by the opposition to follow the PLA's plan with then-Prime Minister Prachanda, who until two months prior was the supreme commander of the PLA, announced a special committee to be formed in order to facilitate the integration process. However, Nepali Congress' opposition to the plan, specifically the proposal that the committee should be headed by a Maoist representative, resulted in the failure of the panel to form and the continuation of deadlock on the issue.

NC leaders also began protestation against claimed moves by the Maoists to appoint Nanda Kishor Pun, the chief of PLA after Prachanda stepped down, as the chief of the integrated armed forces. Due to the infighting among the two biggest parties, Prachanda, for a second time, delayed the scheduled cabinet meeting that was to have announced the formation of the committee and the merger of the PLA with the Nepalese Army remained one of the hardest blocks in the ongoing peace process to overcome.

For two years, 15,000 PLA fighters lead life in cantonments in allegedly poor conditions, and many hoping for eventual state recognition and integration into the armed forces, which was a key condition of the peace pact signed by the Maoists in 2006. The NC which was the ruling party in 2006 had agreed to the condition.

The integration process was started in November 2011.

== Ranks ==
The People’s Liberation Army of the Maoists during the Nepal Civil War used a hierarchical but relatively flexible rank structure. At the top was the Supreme Commander, a role held by Prachanda, followed by senior commanders. Below them were operational command levels such as division, brigade, battalion, company, platoon, and section commanders, with ordinary fighters forming the base. Unlike a conventional army, the system was not rigidly standardized, and many individuals held both political and military roles. As a result, titles like “commander” were often used broadly, and exact ranks or insignia were not always clearly defined or consistently recorded.

=== Supreme Commander ===
The Supreme Commander of the People’s Liberation Army (PLA) during the Nepal Civil War was Prachanda, the chairman of the Communist Party of Nepal (Maoist). As Supreme Commander, Prachanda held ultimate authority over the PLA, including overall military strategy, planning of major offensives, and coordination between political and military wings of the movement. Although day-to-day battlefield command was often handled by subordinate commanders and field leaders, all major strategic decisions were made under his leadership. His role combined both political and military leadership, which was typical of Maoist insurgent structures. The PLA was not an independent national army but the armed wing of the Maoist party, so Prachanda’s authority came from his position as the top party leader. He worked closely with other senior figures such as Baburam Bhattarai, who focused more on political and ideological strategy. Under his command, the PLA grew from a small guerrilla force into a large, organized insurgent army capable of controlling significant rural areas of Nepal. His leadership was central to sustaining the decade-long conflict and eventually bringing the Maoists into peace negotiations, which led to the end of the war in 2006 and the integration of the PLA into the national peace process.

=== Senior ranks ===
- Supreme Commander – held by Prachanda (overall head of the PLA)
- Deputy Commander/Senior Commanders – held by the four core Deputy Commanders: Nanda Kishor Pun, Barshaman Pun, Janardan Sharma, and Chandra Prakash Khanal (top leadership assisting overall command)

=== Officer ranks ===
- Division Commander – commander of a major regional battlefield formation (e.g., Ganesh Man Pun, Commander and Political Commissar of the 4th Division)
- Brigade Commander
- Battalion Commander
- Company Commander
- Platoon Commander
- Section Commander / Squad Leader

=== Lower ranks ===
- Section members/fighters (combatants) – ordinary soldiers of the PLA

== See also ==
- Progressive Campaign, Nepal
- Nepali Communist Party
- Women in the Nepalese Civil War
