= Chief of the Nepalese Army =

The Chief of the Nepalese Army (or Gorkhali Army) (Nepali: नेपाली सेनाको प्रधानसेनापति) is the military position of army head of the Nepalese Army, initially known as Gorkhali Army. The Chief of the Nepalese Army had been from among the Kaji officers during the 18th century. During the reign of Bhimsen Thapa, the title of Commander-in-Chief was introduced for the first time for denoting the army chief. Later in the late 1970s, the title was changed to Chief of Army Staff (CoAS). Currently, the Chief of the Army Staff is the Chief of the Nepalese Army.

== History ==
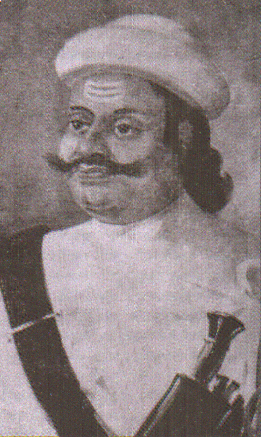
Kalu Pande, the first civilian chief of then Gorkhali army

The Chief of Nepalese Army have been mostly drawn from noble Chhetri families from Gorkha such as "Pande dynasty", "Basnyat dynasty", and "Thapa dynasty" before the rule of "Rana dynasty". During the Shah monarchy, the officers were drawn from these aristocratic families. During the Rana dynasty, Ranas overtook the position as birthright. The first army chief of Nepal was King Prithvi Narayan Shah who drafted and commanded the Nepali (Gorkhali) Army. The first civilian army chief was Kaji Kalu Pande who had significant role in the campaign of Nepal. He was considered as army head due to the undertaking of duties and responsibilities of the army but not by the formalization of the title. Both Indra Adhikari and Shiva Ram Khatri mentions Kalu Pande, Vamsharaj Pande, Damodar Pande, Abhiman Singh Basnyat as Chief of Nepalese Army before first titular Commander-in-Chief Bhimsen Thapa.

Mukhtiyar Bhimsen Thapa was the first person to use Commander-in-Chief as the title of army chief. He was given the title of General as an additional portfolio to the position of Mukhtiyar. During the Anglo-Nepalese War, Bhimsen bore all the responsibilities of the army as a Commander-in-Chief. King Rajendra Bikram Shah appointed Bhimsen to the post of Commander-in-Chief on 1835 A.D. and praised Bhimsen for long service to the nation. However, on 14 June 1837, the King took over the command of all the battalions put in charge of various courtiers, and himself became the Commander-in-Chief. Immediately after the incarceration of the Thapas in 1837, Dalbhanjan Pande and Rana Jang Pande were the joint head of military administration. However, Rana Jang was removed after 3 months in October 1837. During the Rana dynasty, the founding Rana Prime Minister Jung Bahadur Rana made the position hereditary on agnatic rolls of succession. The Commander-in-Chief was made the second rank in the hierarchy to Prime Minister of Nepal and was made to succeed as the Prime Minister in case of death of reigning Prime Minister. Commander-in-Chief (C-in-C) was second in the hierarchy than Supreme Commander during Rana Era. The eradication of Rana dynasty from power after Revolution of 1951 did not end Ranas' dominance. During the Panchayat period, the Ranas continued to dominate the rank of Commander-in-Chief of Nepalese Army. In the late 1970s, Commander-in-Chief was replaced by new term Chief of the Army Staff (COAS) from the reign of General Singha Pratap Shah.

== List of Chiefs of the Nepalese Army ==
=== List of Pradhan Senapati (Chief Generals) of Gorkhali Army (1743–1835) ===
No.	Name	Portrait	Took office	Left office	Notes
–	Prithvi Narayan Shah (1723–1775)		c.1743	c.1743	Founder of Gorkhali Army
1.	Kaji; Shivaram Singh Basnyat (1714–1747)		c.1743	February 1747	First civilian army chief of Gorkhali forces.
2.	Kaji; Vamshidhar "Kalu" Pande (1713–1757)		February 1747	June 1757	
3.	Kaji; Vamsharaj Pande (1739–1785)		??	July 1785	Probably, joint chief of army with others.
4.	Kaji; Abhiman Singh Basnyat (1744–1800)		??	April 1794	Probably, joint chief of army with others.
5.	Kaji; Damodar Pande (1752–1804)		??	March 1804	Probably, joint chief of army with others.
–	Rana Bahadur Shah (1775–1806)		1804	April 1806	
6.	General; Bhimsen Thapa (1775–1839)		1811	1835	

=== List of Commanders-in-Chief of the Nepalese Army (1835–1979) ===
No.	Name	Portrait	Took office	Left office	Unit of Commission
6.	General; Bhimsen Thapa (1775–1839)		1835	14 June 1837	
7.	Kaji; Rana Jang Pande (1789–1843)		June 1837	October 1837	
8.	Mukhtiyar/Chautariya/General; Chautariya Pushkar Shah (1784–1841)		August 1838	April 1839	
9.	General; Mathabar Singh Thapa (1798–1845)		November 1843	17 May 1845	
10.	General; Jung Bahadur Rana (1816–1877)		15 September 1846	1 August 1856	
11.	General; Bam Bahadur Kunwar (1818–1857)		1 August 1856	25 May 1857	
12.	General; Krishna Bahadur Kunwar Rana (1823–1863)		25 May 1857	1862	
13.	General; Ranodip Singh Kunwar (1825–1885)		1862	27 February 1877	
14.	General; Jagat Shumsher Rana (1827–1879)		27 February 1877	11 May 1879	
15.	General; Dhir Shumsher Kunwar Rana (1828–1884)		11 May 1879	14 October 1884	
16.	General; Jit Jung Rana (–)		October 1884	22 November 1885	
17.	General; Khadga Shumsher Jung Bahadur Rana (1861–1921)		22 November 1885	13 March 1887	
18.	General; Rana Shumsher Jung Bahadur Rana (1861–1887)		March 1887	June 1887	
19.	General; Dev Shumsher Jung Bahadur Rana (1862–1914)		June 1887	5 March 1901	
20.	General; Chandra Shumsher Jung Bahadur Rana (1863–1929)		5 March 1901	27 June 1901	
21.	General; Bhim Shumsher Jung Bahadur Rana (1865–1932)		27 June 1901	26 November 1929	
22.	General; Juddha Shumsher Jung Bahadur Rana (1875–1952)		26 November 1929	14 October 1932	
23.	General; Rudra Shumsher Jung Bahadur Rana (1879–1964)		14 October 1932	18 March 1934	
24.	General; Padma Shumsher Jung Bahadur Rana (1882–1961)		18 March 1934	29 November 1945	
25.	General; Mohan Shumsher Jung Bahadur Rana (1885–1967)		29 November 1945	30 April 1948	
26.	General; Baber Shumsher Jung Bahadur Rana (1888–1960)		30 April 1948	1951	
27.	General; Kaiser Shumsher Jung Bahadur Rana (1892–1964)		1951	1953	
28.	General; Kiran Shumsher Jung Bahadur Rana (1916–1983)		1953	1956	
29.	General; Toran Shumsher Jung Bahadur Rana (1904–?)		1956	1960	
30.	General; Nir Shumsher Jung Bahadur Rana (1913–2013)		1960	1965	
31.	General; Surendra Bahadur Shah (–)		1965	1970	
32.	General; Singha Bahadur Basnyat (–)		1970	10 May 1975	
33.	General; Guna Shumsher Jung Bahadur Rana (born 1923)		10 May 1975	10 May 1979	

=== List of Chiefs of the Army Staff of Nepal (1979–present) ===
No.	Name	Portrait	Took office	Left office	Unit of Commission
34.	General; Singha Pratap Shah (born 1930)		15 May 1979	15 May 1983	
35.	General; Arjun Narsingh Rana (–)		15 May 1983	15 May 1987	
36.	General; Satchit J.B.R. (born 1934)	General Satchit Jung Bahadur Rana (J.B.R.), former Chief of the Army Staff (COAS) of the Nepali Army.	15 May 1987	15 May 1991	
37.	General; Gadul Shumsher J.B.R. (1936–2016)		15 May 1991	4 May 1995	
38.	General; Dharmapaal Barsingh Thapa (1939–2024)	General Dharmapaal Barsingh Thapa, Chief of the Army Staff (COAS) of the Nepali Army.	15 May 1995	15 May 1999	
39.	General; Prajwalla Shumsher J.B.R. (born 1941)		19 May 1999	9 September 2003	
40.	General; Pyar Jung Thapa (born 1946)		10 September 2003	9 September 2006	
41.	General; Rookmangad Katawal (born 1948)	General Rookmangad Katwal, former Chief of the Army Staff (COAS) of the Nepali Army.	9 September 2006	9 September 2009	
42.	General; Chhatra Man Singh Gurung (born 1952)		9 September 2009	5 September 2012	Shreenath Battalion
43.	General; Gaurav Shumsher J.B.R. (born 1955)	General Gaurav Shumsher J.B.R., former Chief of the Army Staff (COAS) of the Nepali Army.	6 September 2012	10 September 2015	Purano Gorakh Battalion
44.	General; Rajendra Chhetri (born 1960)	General Rajendra Chhetri, former Chief of the Army Staff (COAS) of the Nepali Army.	10 September 2015	8 September 2018	Rajdal Battalion
45.	General; Purna Chandra Thapa (born 1960)	General Purna Chandra Thapa, former Chief of the Army Staff (COAS) of the Nepali Army.	9 September 2018	9 September 2021	Gorakh Bahadur Battalion
46.	General; Prabhu Ram Sharma (born 1964)	General Prabhu Ram Sharma, former Chief of the Army Staff (COAS) of the Nepali Army.	9 September 2021	8 September 2024	Purano Gorakh Battalion
47.	General; Ashok Raj Sigdel (born 1967)		9 September 2024	Incumbent	Devidutta Battalion

== Bibliography ==
- Acharya, Baburam (2012), Acharya, Shri Krishna (ed.), Janaral Bhimsen Thapa : Yinko Utthan Tatha Pattan (in Nepali), Kathmandu: Education Book House, p. 228, ISBN 9789937241748
- Adhikari, Indra (2015), Military and Democracy in Nepal, Routledge, ISBN 9781317589068
- Hamal, Lakshman B. (1995), Military history of Nepal, Sharda Pustak Mandir
- Nepal, Gyanmani (2007), Nepal ko Mahabharat (in Nepali) (3rd ed.), Kathmandu: Sajha, p. 314, ISBN 9789993325857
- Oldfield, Henry Ambrose (1880), Sketches from Nipal, Vol 1, vol. 1, London: W.H. Allan & Co.
- Pradhan, Kumar L. (2012), Thapa Politics in Nepal: With Special Reference to Bhim Sen Thapa, 1806–1839, New Delhi: Concept Publishing Company, p. 278, ISBN 9788180698132
- Khatri, Shiva Ram (1999), Nepal Army Chiefs: Short Biographical Sketches, University of Michigan: Sira Khatri
- Karmacharya, Ganga (2005). Queens in Nepalese Politics: An Account of Roles of Nepalese Queens in State Affairs, 1775-1846. Educational Publishing House. ISBN 978-99946-33-93-7.
