= Baber Shumsher Jung Bahadur Rana =

Nepal minister of defense (1888–1960)

Commanding General Shree Teen Maharajkumar Sir Baber Shumsher Jung Bahadur Rana GCVO GBE KCSI KCIE
- श्री ३ महाराजकुमार महारथी बबर शमशेर जङ्गबहादुर राणा
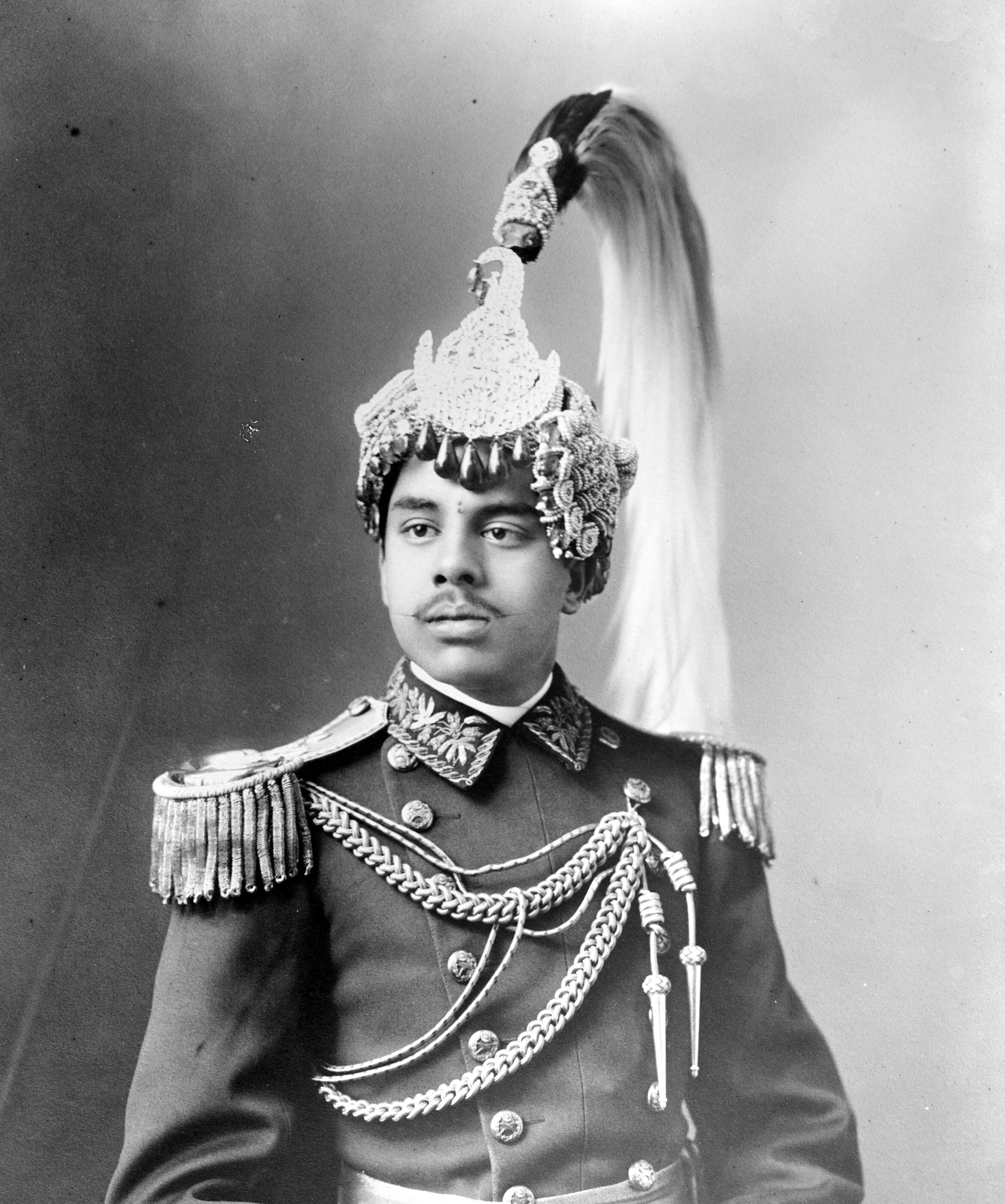
- Baber Shumsher Jung Bahadur Rana in the 1910s

Commander-In-Chief of Nepal Army
- In office 30 April 1948 – 1951
- Preceded by: Mohan Shumsher Jung Bahadur Rana
- Succeeded by: Kiran Shamsher Rana

Minister of Defence of Nepal
- In office 18 February 1951 – 10 June 1951
- Prime Minister: Mohan Shumsher Jung Bahadur Rana

Personal details
- Born: 27 January 1888 Kathmandu, Nepal
- Died: 12 May 1960 (aged 72) Kathmandu, Nepal
- Relations: Shree Teen Maharajah Sir Chandra Shamsher Jang Bahadur Rana (father); Shree Teen Maharajah Sir Mohan Shamsher Jang Bahadur Rana (brother), Field Marshal Sir Kaiser Shamsher Jang Bahadur Rana (brother), General Gaurav Shamsher Jang Bahadur Rana (great grandson); Udaya Shumsher Rana ( great grandson)
- Awards: GCVO; GBE, KCSI, KCIE; Order of the Star of Nepal, Order of Gorkha Dakshina Bahu, Order of Tri Shakti Patta, Order of Om Ram Patta, Chief Commander of the Legion of Merit

Military service
- Allegiance: Nepal
- Branch/service: Nepali Army
- Years of service: 1901–1951
- Rank: Commanding officer
- Battles/wars: World War I World War II

Sir Baber Shumsher Jung Bahadur Rana (27 January 1888 – 12 May 1960) was a member of the Rana dynasty who served as the Minister of Defence of Nepal in 1951. A prominent member of the Rana oligarchy, he fought valiantly in the First World War. He was the second son of Maharaja Sir Chandra Shamsher Jang Bahadur Rana and Bada Maharani Chandra Loka Bhakta Lakshmi Devi. He was the younger brother of Maharaja Sir Mohan Shamsher Jang Bahadur Rana and older brother of Field Marshal Sir Kaiser Shamsher Jang Bahadur Rana.

== Family ==
Sir Baber Shumsher Jang Bahadur Rana was born to Maharaja Chandra Shamsher Jang Bahadur Rana, T'ung-ling-ping-ma-Kuo-Kang-wang, Maharaja of Lamjung and Kaski, GCB and Bada Maharani Chandra Loka Bhakta Lakshmi Devi on 27 January 1888, at Kathmandu.

== Later life ==
Sir Baber Shumsher was educated at the Mayo College, Ajmer in India. In 1901, he was made a Major General of the Royal Nepalese Army and was promoted to Lieutenant General in 1903. After being Aide de camp to his father in 1908, he was promoted to a General in 1914, and finally to the post of Commanding General in 1934. In 1927, he was made an Honorary Colonel in the British Army. In 1946, he led the Royal Nepalese troops at the Victory parade in London. During the premiership (1948–1951) of his older brother, Sir Mohan Shamsher, Sir Baber Shamsher was the Mukhtiyar and Commander-in-Chief of the Royal Nepalese Army. In 1951, he became the Minister for Defence in the Congress Rana Cabinet led, by his brother. However he was a bete noire in the eyes of the Nepali Congress, and was replaced by his younger brother, Singha Shamsher Jang Bahadur Rana on 10 June 1951.

== Death ==
He died at his residence at Baber Mahal, Kathmandu on 12 May 1960 (which was built for him by his father). His brother Kaiser Shumsher Jang Bahadur Rana, died four years later at the same age.

== Honours ==
- (British Raj) Delhi Durbar silver medal, 1903
- (British Raj) Delhi Durbar silver medal, 1911
- (United Kingdom) Mentioned in Despatches, 1915
- Sword of Honour, 1916
- (United Kingdom) Knight Commander of the Order of the Indian Empire (KCIE), 1916
- Order of the Star of Nepal, 1st Class, 1918
- (United Kingdom) British War Medal, 1918
- (United Kingdom) Commonwealth Victory Medal, 1918
- (United Kingdom) Mentioned in Despatches, 1919
- (United Kingdom) Waziristan Field Medal, 1919
- (United Kingdom) Indian General Service Medal w/ Afghanistan Clasp-1919
- (United Kingdom) Knight Commander of the Order of the Star of India (KCSI), 1919
- (United Kingdom) Knight Grand Cross of the Order of the British Empire (GBE), 1919
- (United Kingdom) Honorary Colonel, British Army, 1927
- (Nepal) Order of Gorkha Dakshina Bahu (Gurkha Right Hand), Member 1st Class, 1935
- (Nepal) Order of Tri Shakti Patta (Three Divine Powers), Member 1st Class, 1939
- (Nepal) Order of Om Rama Patta, Member, 1946
- (United Kingdom) Knight Grand Cross of the Royal Victorian Order (GCVO), 1946
- (United States) Chief Commander of the Legion of Merit of the US, 1946

== Ancestors ==
Ancestors of Baber Shumsher Jung Bahadur Rana

16. Ranajit Kunwar
8. Bal Narsingh Kunwar
4. Dhir Shamsher Rana
18. Nain Singh Thapa
9. Ganesh Kumari Thapa
19. Rana Kumari Pande
2. Chandra Shamsher Jang Bahadur Rana
20. Amar Singh Thapa (sanukaji)
10. Bakhtawar Singh Thapa
21. Satyarupa Maya
5. Nanda Kumari Thapa
1. Baber Shamsher Jang Bahadur Rana
3. Chandra Loka Bhakta Lakshmi Devi
