= Nir Shumsher Jung Bahadur Rana =

Field Marshal of the Royal Nepalese Army Nir Shumsher JBR
- Born: December 25, 1913; Jawalakhel, Lalitpur, Nepal
- Died: October 27, 2013 (aged 99); Chhauni, Kathmandu, Nepal
- Relatives: Juddha Shumsher Jung Bahadur Rana (father); Mahila Maharani (mother)
- Military career
- Allegiance: Nepal
- Service years: 1931–1965
- Conflicts: World War II

Nir Shumsher Jung Bahadur Rana (or Neer Shumsher JBR). Field Marshal and retired General of the Nepal Army (NA). Born on 11 Poush, 1970 B.S. (1913) in Jawalakhel Durbar, Jawalakhel, Lalitpur, Field Marshal Rana died at the age of 99. He was son of the then ruling Rana Prime Minister Juddha Shumsher Rana and his second wife, Mahila Maharani Krishna Kumari. According to a statement, the centenarian Field Marshal had joined the then Royal Nepal Army (RNA) at the age of 18 on 1 Shrawan 1988 B.S (1931) and was appointed to the post of Major at the Shri Pashupati Prasad Battalion. He became the Commander-in-Chief of the RNA on 15 Baisakh, 2017 B.S (1960) and retired on 15 Baisakh in 2022 B.S (1965). He was appointed Field Marshal after his retirement in 2022 B.S.

He was educated at the Durbar High School, Kathmandu and Shanti Niketan, West Bengal.

Field Marshal Rana was posted at the Northwest Frontier Province in Rawalpindi of Pakistan and Burma during World War II. Rana was decorated with national orders such as Tribhuvan Prajatantra Shripad, Ujwol Krimaya Nepal Shripad, Nepal Taradisha, Om Rama Patta, Tri Shakti Patta and Gorkha Dakshina Bahu. Field Marshal Rana was also decorated with foreign orders; Royal Victorian Order, Order of the British Empire, Legion of Honour of France, Order of Merit of the Federal Republic of Germany and Order of the Yugoslav Star.

In 2006, Rana established the ‘Field Marshal Nir Natural Disaster Relief Fund’ to support the retired officers amid natural disasters. He had established ‘Nir Shumsher Award Fund’ in 1993 to motivate the military athletes. Chief of Army Staff (CoAS) Gaurav Shumsher Rana among other senior army officers paid tributes to Rana at the hospital. Rana’s body was cremated at Pashupatinath Aryaghat with military honours.

He married Khila Rajya Lakshmi, daughter of Yakshya Bikram Shah (a prominent aristocrat who was very popular in the royal palace). They had a son and daughter together:

- Diwakar Shumsher Jang Bahadur Rana. Married and had issue:
  - Binaya Shumsher Jang Bahadur Rana.
  - Himachal Shumsher Jang Bahadur Rana.
- Hazurie Kumari.

However his wife who he loved dearly died at an early age and left him devastated. Some years later he married Bimala Rajya Lakshmi from the Vazir family in Jammu in 1943 and they had a son:

- Prabhat Shumsher Jang Bahadur Rana. He married Neera Rajya Lakshmi, daughter of Aanand Bikram Shah and his wife, Abha Rajya Lakshmi. They had issue:
  - Rajat Shumsher Jang Bahadur Rana. They had issue:
    - Ashwath Shumsher Jang Bahadur Rana.
    - Aanavi Rajya Lakshmi.
  - Pramada Rajya Lakshmi. A social activist. Married to Ashish Bikram Shah, youngest son of Kumar Khadga Bikram Shah and his wife, Princess Sharada Shah of Nepal.

Field Marshal Nir Shumsher Jang Bahadur Rana died at the age of 99 on 27 October 2013 at the King Birendra Military Hospital in Chhauni, Kathmandu, while undergoing treatment.

== Honours ==
National Honours

- Member of the Tribhuvan Order of the Footprint of Democracy, 1st class.
- Member of the Order of the Benevolent Ruler.
- Member of the Order of the Power of the Rama Mantra.
- Member of the Order of the Star of Nepal, 2nd class (8 August 1943).
- Member of the Order of the Star of Nepal, 1st class.
- Member of the Order of the Gurkha Right Hand, 1st class.
- Member of the Order of Three Divine Powers, 2nd class.
- Assam-Burma Medal (1945).

Foreign Honours

- Knight Grand Cross of the Royal Victorian Order [GCVO] (26 February 1961).
- Knight Commander of the Order of the British Empire [KBE] (2 November 1945).
- British Star (1945).
- Burma Star (1945).
- Defence Medal (1945).
- War Medal (1945).
- Queen Elizabeth II Coronation Medal (2 June 1953).
- Knight Grand Cross of the Order of Merit of the Federal Republic of Germany.
- Grand Officer of the Legion of Honour.
