= Dharmapaal Barsingh Thapa =

Nepali military officer (1939–2024)

His Excellency General Dharmapal Barsingh Thapa
- धर्मपाल वरसिँह थापा
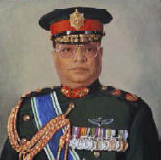
- Official portrait, 1995

Chief of Army Staff
- In office 1995–1999
- Preceded by: Gadul Shumsher J.B. Rana
- Succeeded by: Prajwal Shumsher J.B. Rana

Personal details
- Born: 1939 Bhurumkhel, Nepal
- Died: 16 May 2024 (aged 85) Kathmandu, Nepal
- Parent: Netra Bahadur Thapa (father)
- Education: Tribhuvan University, US Army War College
- Awards: Nepal Tara (First Class), Gorkha Dakshin Bahu (First Class)

Military service
- Rank: General
- Battles/wars: Nepalese civil war

Dharmapal Barsingh Thapa (Nepali: धर्मपाल वरसिँह थापा; 1939 – 16 May 2024) was a Nepali military officer who was the Chief of Army Staff (1995–1999) and Director of Avant venture.

Thapa died of lung disease on 16 May 2024, at the age of 85.

== Sources ==
- Khatri, Shiva Ram (1999), Nepal Army Chiefs:Short Biographical Sketches, University of Michigan: Sira Khatri
