= National Defence College (India) =

Premier Academic Institute

- Motto: बुध्दिर्यस्य बलंतस्य (Sanskrit)
- Motto in English: Buddhiryasya Balamtasya (He who has wisdom has the strength)
- Type: Defence Service Training Institute
- Established: 27 April 1960; 66 years ago
- Commandant: Air Marshal Manish Kumar Gupta AVSM
- Location: New Delhi, India
- Website: ndc.in

The National Defence College, located in New Delhi, is a staff college and the highest seat of strategic learning for Defence Service and Civil Service officers. This is a very prestigious course attended only by a few hand-picked defence officers of One-Star rank and civil servants of the rank of Joint secretary to the Government of India. Each year, approximately 25 officers from friendly foreign countries like the US, UK, Canada, France, Germany, Australia, Vietnam, Sri Lanka, Nepal, UAE and others attend the course.

This college provides strategic leadership to the Government of India in national and international security matters and also acts as a think tank on defence matters and holds a very important position in shaping up the Indian defence outlook.

== History ==
After India's independence in 1947, senior officers of the Indian Army, Indian Navy and the Indian Air Force attended the Imperial Defence College (IDC) in the United Kingdom before being appointed to important commands. The vacancies at the IDC was only about two or three each year. In 1959, the Government of India announced that a college on the pattern of the IDC will set up in New Delhi. This would allow for a larger number of officers to be trained. Lieutenant General Kanwar Bahadur Singh, the Adjutant General at Army HQ was appointed the first Commandant of the college.

== Location ==
The college is located on Tees January Marg of Lutyens' Delhi, in a grand British-era building spread over acres of lush green lawns. The building was built by Sir Sobha Singh as a mansion for Khan Saheb Tej Muhammad Khan of Badrashi, North-West Frontier Province. From 1939 to 1947, the building served as an Army General Mess. From 1947 to 1960, it was the office and residence of the Deputy High Commissioner of the United Kingdom to India.

The college is adjacent to the home where Mahatma Gandhi lived the last five months of his life, and the garden where he was assassinated - the Gandhi Smriti. Residential facilities for the officers are located in the central vista of Delhi, on Ashok Rajpath near India Gate. The Commandant of NDC has a bungalow at 16, Akbar Road called NDC House.

== Crest ==
The crest of NDC has a lamp of knowledge surrounded by the wreath of green Ashoka tree leaves with the State Emblem of India superimposed and placed against the rich maroon backdrop of the Joint Services flag. The lamp has four flames representing the Indian Army, the Indian Navy, the Indian Air Force and the Civil Services of India.

== Commandant ==
The NDC is headed by the Commandant who is the overall in-charge of all the functioning of the college including academics and administration. The Commandant of the college is an Officer of Three-star rank. The tenure of each Commandant is for 2 years which rotates between the Indian Army, the Indian Navy and the Indian Air Force.

== Faculty and staff ==
The Faculty of NDC was designed to be minimal. There are called Senior Directing Staff (SDS) and direct the students, rather than deliver lectures. The lectures are delivered by distinguished guest speakers. The SDS is drawn from the Army, Navy, Air Force and Civil services and are of two-star rank. Usually, there are 7 SDS (Army – 3, Navy – 1, Air Force – 1, IAS – 1 and IFS – 1). Apart from these 7 SDS, the college regularly invites think tanks, ambassadors of different nations, business leaders, ministers from India and friendly countries, defence chiefs of friendly countries to give lectures in the college.

The administrative wing is headed by the Secretary, a one-star officer from the Indian Army and an alumnus of NDC. He is assisted by the Assistant Adjutant & Quartermaster General (AA&QMG), an officer of the rank of Lieutenant Colonel. Other key staff include the Directing Staff (Coordination) (DS Coord) and Junior Directing Staff (Research & Reference) (JDS R&R). They are officers from the Indian Navy and Indian Air Force on rotation. The DS (Coord) is of the rank of Captain/Group Captain and the JDS (R&R) is of the rank of Commander/Wing Commander.

== Course ==
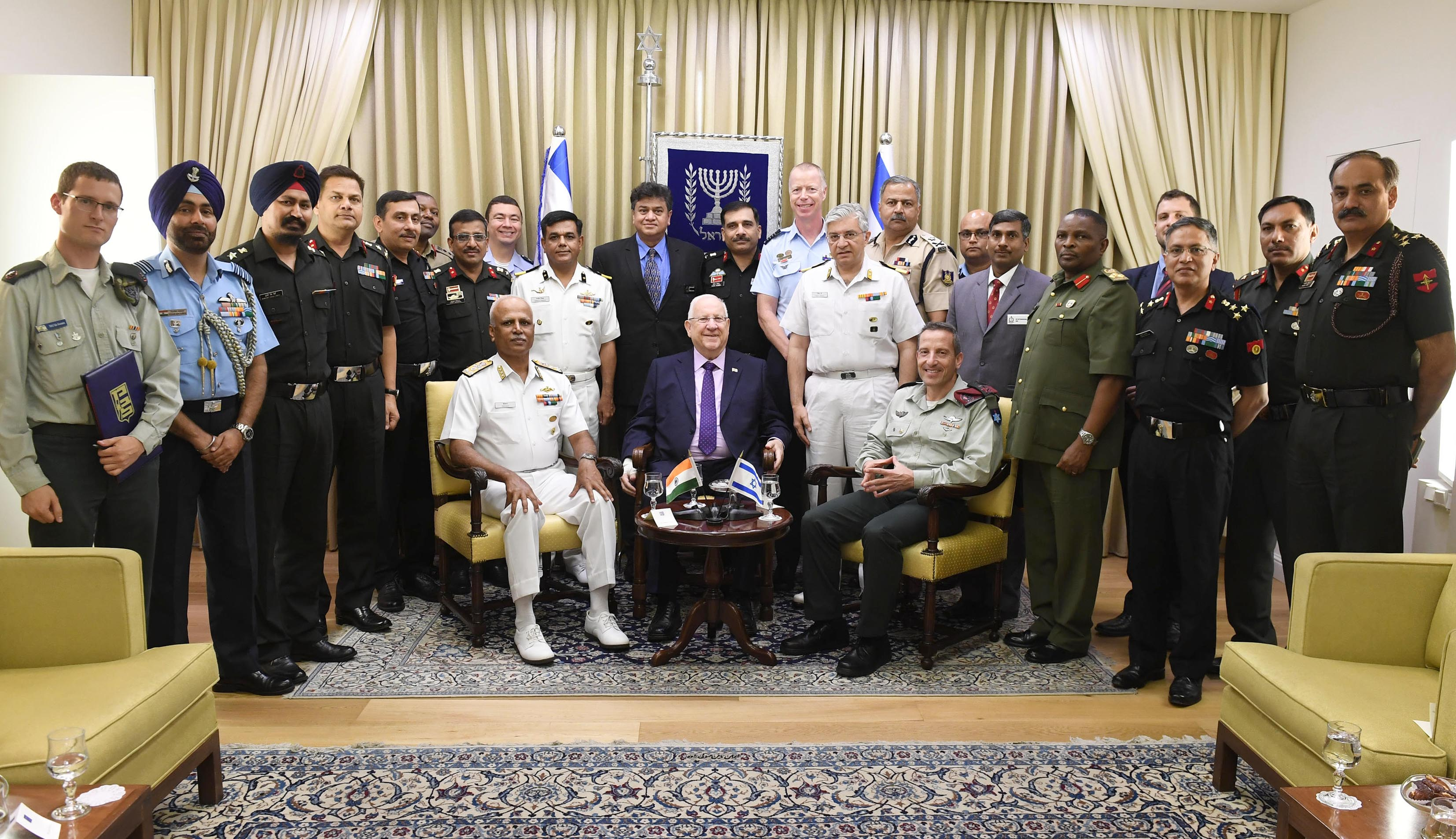
Delegation of National Defence College of India in a meeting with Reuven Rivlin president of Israel, August 2018

The NDC conducts a 47-week National Security and Strategic Study course each year which commences in the first week of January each year and finishes in the first week of December. This course also involves extensive travel within and outside the country to visit Indian states and foreign countries where course members meet head of states and important decision makers to understand the political, social and strategic landscape of the state/country. The entire course is divided in six subjects spread over two terms, as follows:

- Understanding India & Introduction to Strategy
- Study on Economic Security, Science and Technology
- Global Issues
- International Security Environment
- India's Strategic Neighbourhood
- Strategies and Structures for National Security

== Method of Study ==
During the course of each study, the course is divided into seven groups called Integrated Analysis Groups (IAG). Each IAG comprises 13–14 members (4–5 army officers, 1 naval officer, 1–2 air force officers, 3–4 IAS/IPS/Civil Services officers and 4–5 foreign military officers). Each IAG function in a synergetic mode for the purpose of analysing issues, discussions, preparation of papers and presentations. Since 2006, the college has been formally affiliated with Madras University for the award of M.Phil. degree in 'Defence and Strategic Studies.'

== Notable Indian Alumni ==
The Indian alumni include both Chiefs of the Defence Staffs, 13 Chiefs of the Army Staff, 9 Chiefs of the Naval Staff, 10 Chiefs of the Air Staff, 3 Directors of the Intelligence Bureau, 2 Chief Election Commissioners, 12 Ambassadors of India, 3 Directors of CBI, 3 Defence Secretaries and 3 Foreign Secretaries.

Five alumni went on to become Governors of Indian States/UT - Balmiki Prasad Singh, Lieutenant General Krishna Mohan Seth, Vinod Kumar Duggal, E. S. L. Narasimhan and Lieutenant General Gurmit Singh.

== Notable International Alumni ==
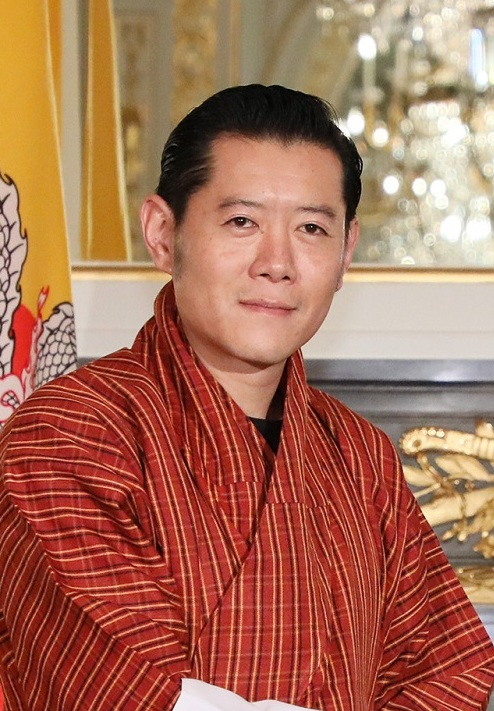
Jigme Khesar Namgyel Wangchuck, King of Bhutan is the youngest student to attend NDC.

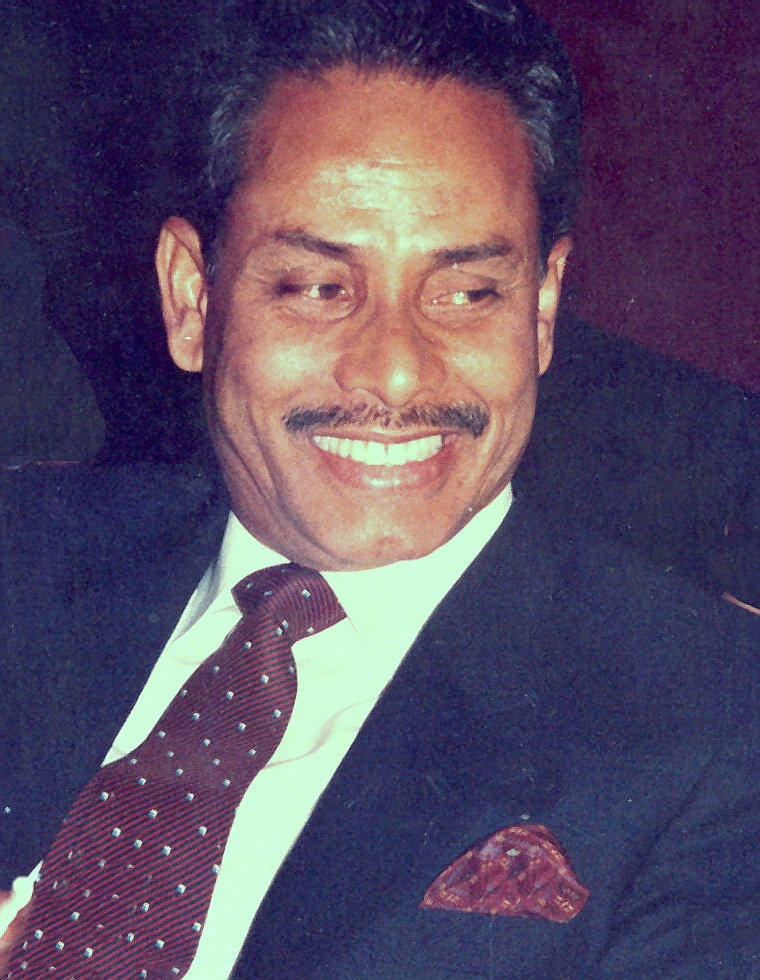
Hussain Muhammad Ershad, 10th President of Bangladesh & 4th Chief of Army Staff of the Bangladesh Army

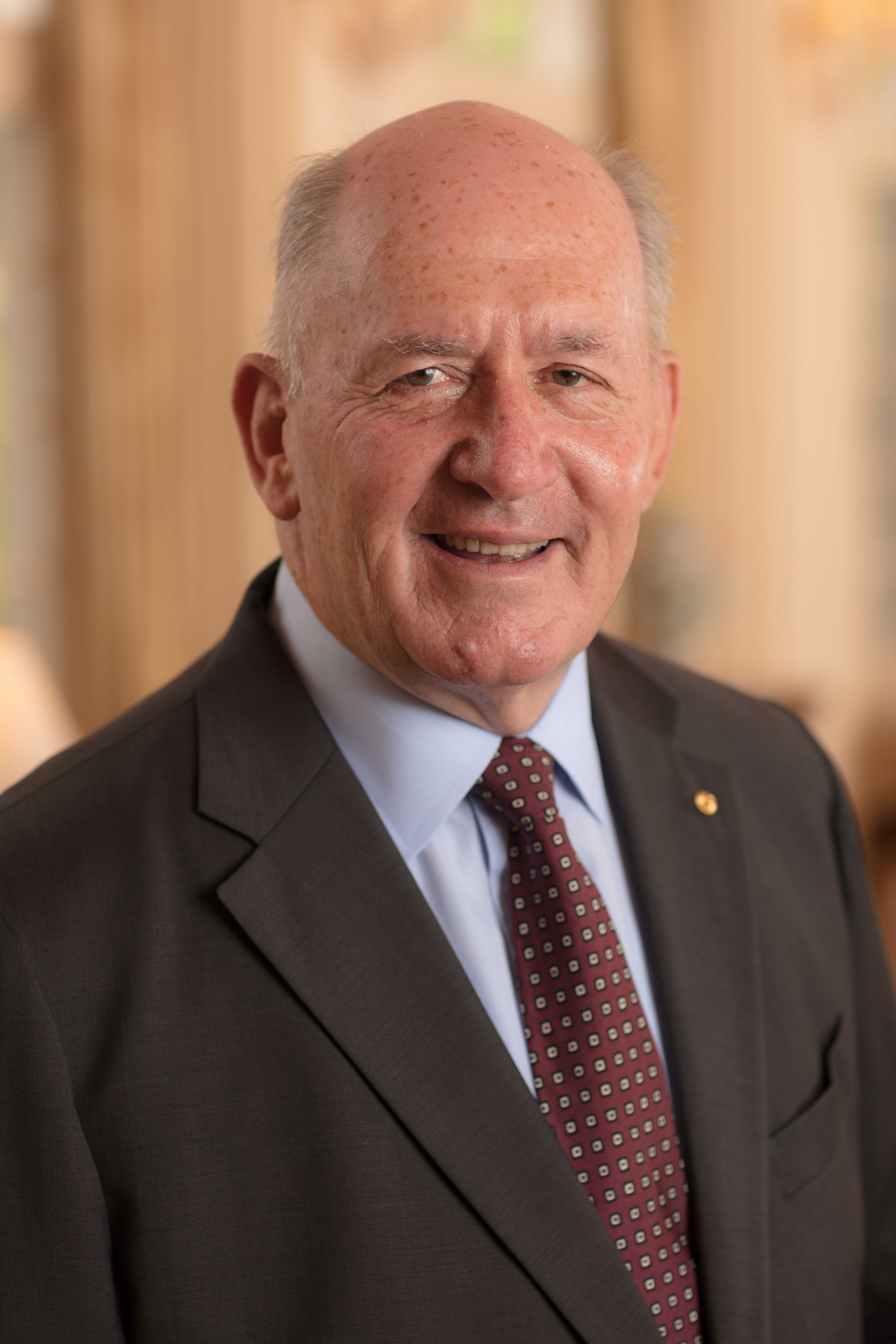
General Sir Peter Cosgrove, 26th Governor-General of Australia & 10th CDF, Australia

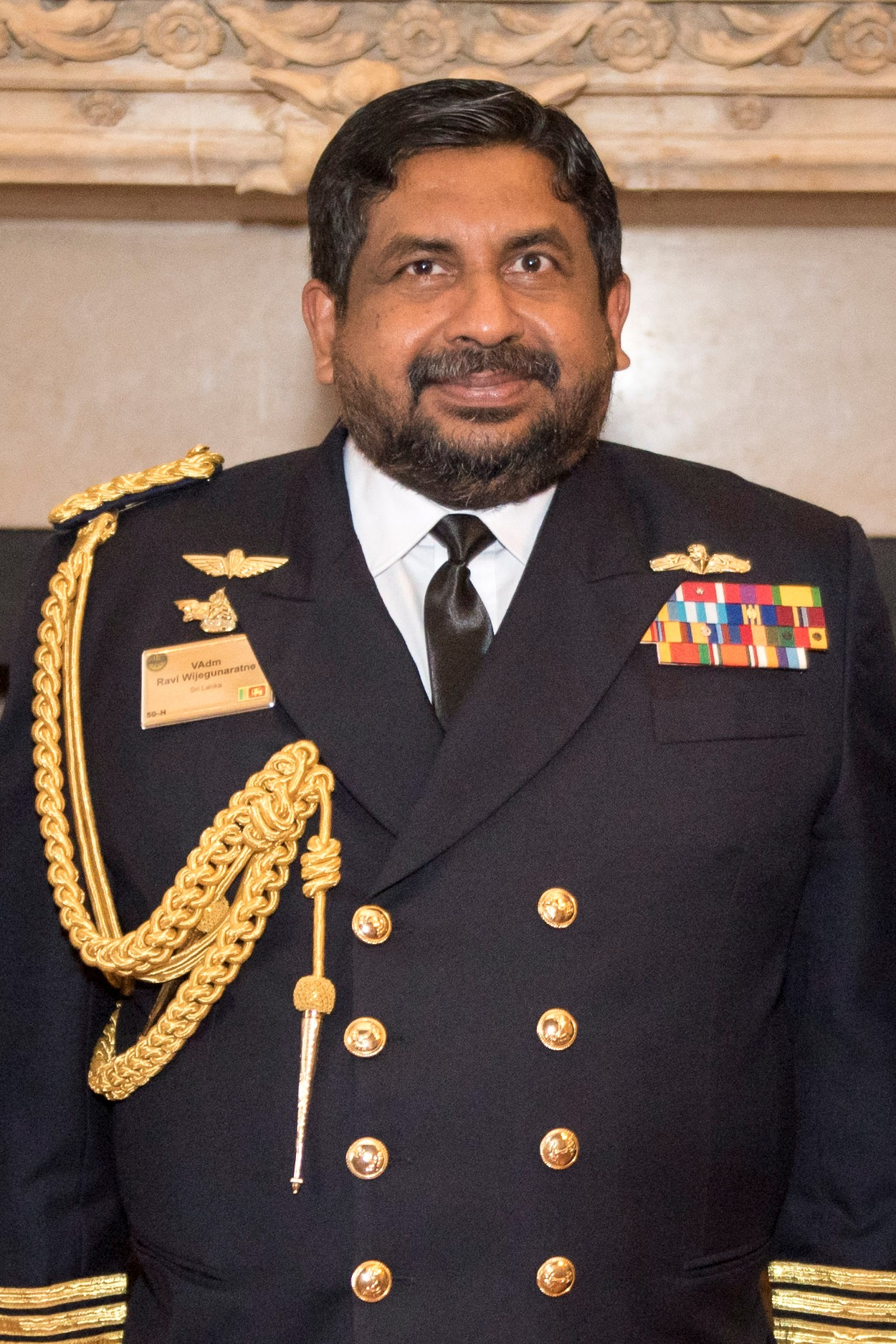
Admiral Ravindra Wijegunaratne, 10th CDS Sri Lanka & 20th Commander of the Sri Lanka Navy.

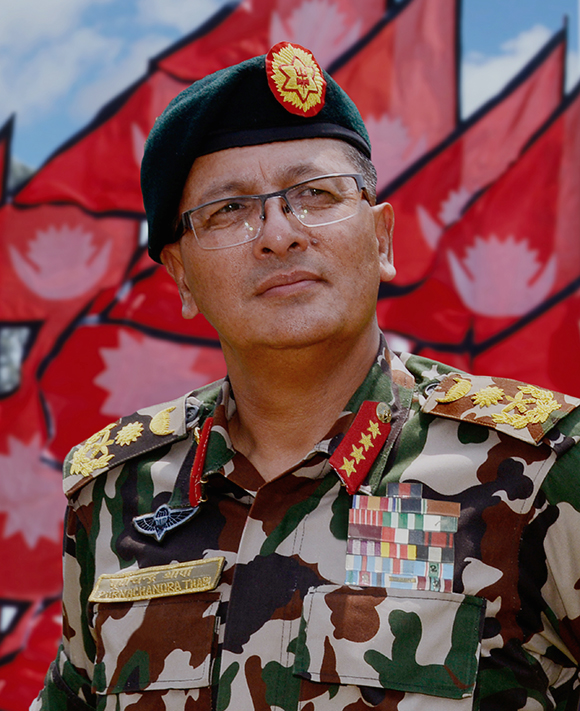
General Purna Chandra Thapa, 12th Chief of the Army Staff of the Nepalese Army

=== Heads of State, Heads of Government, and Representatives ===
- Lieutenant General Hussain Muhammad Ershad, 10th President of Bangladesh & 4th Chief of Army Staff of the Bangladesh Army
- Jigme Khesar Namgyel Wangchuck, 5th Druk Gyalpo (King of Bhutan)
- Lieutenant General Fred Akuffo, 7th Head of state of Ghana and 12th Chief of the Defence Staff of the Ghana Armed Forces
- General Sir Peter Cosgrove, 26th Governor-General of Australia and 10th Chief of Defence Force of the Australian Defence Force

=== Chiefs of Defence ===
- General Rohan Daluwatte, 1st Chief of the Defence Staff of Sri Lanka Armed Forces & 14th Commander of the Sri Lanka Army
- General Lionel Balagalle, 2nd Chief of the Defence Staff of Sri Lanka Armed Forces & 16th Commander of the Sri Lanka Army
- Air Chief Marshal Donald Perera, 4th Chief of the Defence Staff of Sri Lanka Armed Forces & 11th Commander of the Sri Lanka Air Force
- General Shavendra Silva, 11th Chief of the Defence Staff of Sri Lanka Armed Forces & 23rd Commander of the Sri Lanka Army
- Admiral Ravindra Wijegunaratne, 10th Chief of the Defence Staff of Sri Lanka Armed Forces & 20th Commander of the Sri Lanka Navy
- Air Vice Marshal Napoleon Ashley-Lassen, 10th Chief of the Defence Staff of the Ghana Armed Forces & 6th Chief of Air Staff of Ghana Air Force
- Brigadier Joseph Nunoo-Mensah, 16th Chief of the Defence Staff of the Ghana Armed Forces
- Major General Edwin Sam, 17th Chief of the Defence Staff of the Ghana Armed Forces
- Lieutenant General Seth Obeng, 24th Chief of the Defence Staff of the Ghana Armed Forces
- General Azizan Ariffin, 17th Chief of Defence Forces of the Malaysian Armed Forces
- Major General Moosa Ali Jaleel, 3rd Chief of Defence Force of the Maldives National Defence Force
- Major General Hamzah Sahat, 11th Commander of the Royal Brunei Armed Forces
- General Jacob John Mkunda, 9th Chief of Defence Force of the Tanzania People's Defence Force
- Lieutenant General Gibson Jalo, 2nd Chief of the Defence Staff of the Nigerian Armed Forces & 7th Chief of Army Staff of the Nigerian Army
- General Sher Mohammad Karimi, 2nd Chief of General Staff of the Afghan Armed Forces
- Major General Hamzah Sahat, 11th Commander of the Royal Brunei Armed Forces

=== Army ===
- General Denis Perera, 8th Commander of the Sri Lanka Army
- General Tissa Weeratunga, 9th Commander of the Sri Lanka Army
- General Nalin Seneviratne, 10th Commander of the Sri Lanka Army
- General Hamilton Wanasinghe, 11th Commander of the Sri Lanka Army
- General G. H. de Silva, 13th Commander of the Sri Lanka Army
- General Srilal Weerasooriya, 15th Commander of the Sri Lanka Army
- General Shantha Kottegoda, 17th Commander of the Sri Lanka Army
- Major General Matheus Alueendo, 7th Commander of the Namibian Army
- Major General Chris Alli, 13th Chief of Army Staff of the Nigerian Army
- Lieutenant General Abdul Wadud, Principal Staff Officer of Armed Forces Division of Bangladesh
- Lieutenant General Abdulrahman Dambazau, 21st Chief of Army Staff of the Nigerian Army
- General Purna Chandra Thapa, 12th Chief of the Army Staff of the Nepalese Army
- General Prabhu Ram Sharma, 13th Chief of the Army Staff of the Nepalese Army
- Lieutenant General Joseph Musanyufu, Joint Chief of Staff of the Uganda People's Defence Force
- Major General Leopold Kyanda, Joint Chief of Staff of the Uganda People's Defence Force
- Major General Matheus Alueendo, Army Commander of the Namibian Army
- General Mustafizur Rahman, 9th Chief of Army Staff of the Bangladesh Army

=== Navy ===
- Admiral Basil Gunasekara, 7th Commander of the Sri Lanka Navy
- Admiral Henry Perera, 8th Commander of the Sri Lanka Navy
- Vice Admiral Asoka de Silva, 9th Commander of the Sri Lanka Navy
- Admiral H. A. Silva, 10th Commander of the Sri Lanka Navy
- Admiral Clancy Fernando, 11th Commander of the Sri Lanka Navy
- Admiral D. A. M. R. Samarasekara, 12th Commander of the Sri Lanka Navy
- Admiral Thisara Samarasinghe, 16th Commander of the Sri Lanka Navy
- Admiral D. W. A. S. Dissanayake, 17th Commander of the Sri Lanka Navy
- Admiral Sirimevan Ranasinghe, 22nd Commander of the Sri Lanka Navy
- Admiral Nishantha Ulugetenne, 24th Commander of the Sri Lanka Navy
- Vice Admiral Robert Walls, 5th Vice Chief of the Defence Force of the Australian Defence Force
- Vice Admiral Jonathan Mead, 2nd Chief of Joint Capabilities of the Australian Defence Force
- Vice Admiral Akintunde Aduwo, 6th Chief of Naval Staff of the Nigerian Navy
- Vice Admiral E. O. Owusu-Ansah, 14th Chief of Naval Staff of the Ghana Navy
- Rear Admiral John Gbenah, 15th Chief of Naval Staff of the Ghana Navy

=== Air Force ===
- Air Chief Marshal Harry Goonatilake, 5th Commander of the Sri Lanka Air Force
- Air Chief Marshal Dick Perera, 6th Commander of the Sri Lanka Air Force
- Air Chief Marshal Walter Fernando, 7th Commander of the Sri Lanka Air Force
- Air Chief Marshal Terry Gunawardena, 8th Commander of the Sri Lanka Air Force
- Air Chief Marshal Oliver Ranasinghe, 9th Commander of the Sri Lanka Air Force
- Air Chief Marshal Jayalath Weerakkody, 10th Commander of the Sri Lanka Air Force
- Air Chief Marshal Gagan Bulathsinghala, 15th Commander of the Sri Lanka Air Force
- Air Chief Marshal Sudarshana Pathirana, 18th Commander of the Sri Lanka Air Force
- Air Marshal Isaac Alfa, 13th Chief of the Air Staff of the Nigerian Air Force
- Air Vice Marshal Fakhrul Azam, 11th Chief of Air Staff of the Bangladesh Air Force
- Air Vice Marshal Julius Boateng, 18th Chief of Air Staff of the Ghana Air Force
- Brigadier General Mohammad Sharif Ibrahim, Commander of Royal Brunei Air Force

== See also ==
- Indian National Defence University
- Institute for Defence Studies and Analyses
- Ministry of Defence (India)
- Military academies in India
- Sainik school
