= Prajwalla Shamsher JB Rana =

General Prajjwalla Shamsher Jung Bahadur Rana OGDB OTSP
- Native name: महारथी श्री प्रज्वाला शम्शेर जङ्गबहादुर राणा
- Born: 1942 (age 83–84)
- Allegiance: Kingdom of Nepal
- Branch: Royal Nepalese Army
- Service years: 1961-2002
- Rank: General
- Alma mater: St. Xavier's School, Godavari; Tribhuvan University; RMA Sandhurst; Royal School of Artillery; National Defence College
- Spouse: Sindhu Rajya Lakshmi

Prajjwalla Shamsher Jung Bahadur Rana (born 1942) is a former Nepalese Army general, who served as the Chief of Army Staff of the Royal Nepalese Army from 19 May 1999 to 9 September 2003. He is a member of Rana Dynasty of Nepal. He was Chief of Army during a turbulent period in the country's history, which included the 2001 royal palace massacre and the early escalation of the Maoist insurgency.

== Early life ==
Rana was born in Kathmandu District, Nepal on 1942, to Indu Shumshere Jang Bahadur Rana and Maiju Rajya Lakshmi. Rana was the second and youngest son of Indu JBR.
