= Chief of the Army Staff (Nepal) =

Head of the Nepal Army (chief of the army of federal democratic republic of Nepal)

Chief of the Army Staff of the Nepal Army
- प्रधानसेनापति
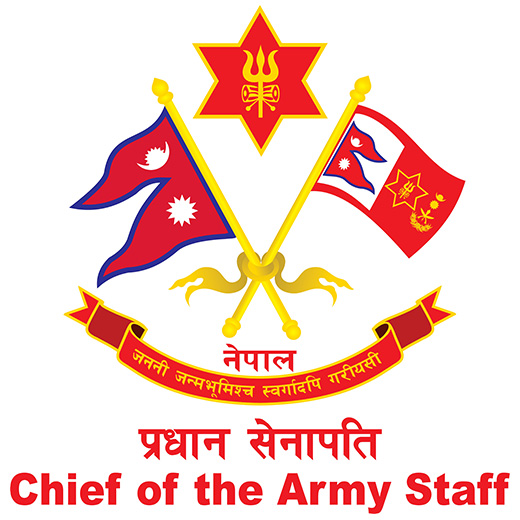
- Emblem of Chief of the Army Staff of Nepal

- Flag of the Chief of the Army Staff

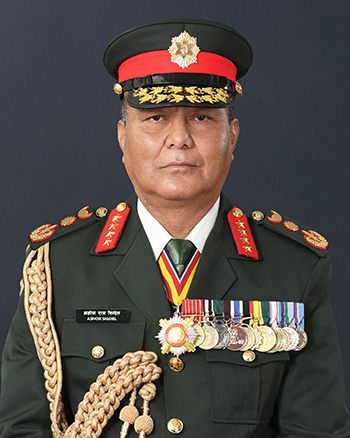
- Incumbent; General Ashok Raj Sigdel since 9 September 2024
- Ministry of Defence
- Abbreviation: COAS
- Reports to: Prime Minister of Nepal; Ministry of Defence
- Seat: Bhadrakali, Kathmandu, Nepal
- Nominator: Government of Nepal
- Appointer: President of Nepal
- Term length: 3 years or up to 61 years of age
- Precursor: Commander-in-Chief of Nepal Army
- Formation: 15 May 1979; 47 years ago
- First holder: General Singha Pratap Shah
- Succession: On basis of seniority, subjected to the decision of the Prime Minister of Nepal.
- Unofficial names: Army Chief; Chief Sa'ab
- Deputy: Vice Chief of the Army Staff
- Website: Official website

The Chief of the Army Staff (COAS) (Nepali: नेपालको प्रधानसेनापति), informally known as Chief Sa'ab (Nepali: चिफ सा'ब), is the chief commander of the Nepalese Army.

The Chief of Army Staff is the Chief of the Nepalese Army and reports to the Ministry of Defense. The appointment is constitutionally subjected to be for three years or up to 61 years of age whichever is earlier. The seat of Chief of Army Staff is in Bhadrakali, Kathmandu. The current Chief of Army Staff is General Ashok Raj Sigdel, since 9 September 2024. The Chief of Army Staff also holds the honorary rank of General of the Indian Army.

== History ==
The Kajis of Gorkha Kingdom (later Kingdom of Nepal) carried the functions of army chief. In the 19th century, Mukhtiyar Bhimsen Thapa was the first person to use Commander-in-Chief as the title of army chief. During the Rana dynasty, the post of army chief was hereditary. In 1979, General Singha Bahadur Basnyat was raised with the title of Chief of Army Staff (COAS) instead of Commander-in-Chief (C-in-C). Since then, COAS is the title of army chief of Nepalese Army. Since 1950, it has been tradition for the President of India to award the chief of the Nepalese Army with the honorary rank of General of the Indian Army.

== Appointment ==
As per Section 8 of Army Act (2063) of Nepal, the Chief of Army Staff is appointed by the President of Nepal on the recommendation of Council of Ministers of Nepal. The Chief of Army Staff is the head of the Nepalese military. As per Section 10 of the same, the appointment is subjected to be for three years or up to 61 years whichever is earlier. As per Section 8(3) of Nepal Army Act (2063), in case of leave by current COAS, the President of Nepal can appoint the seniormost officer as the acting Chief of Army Staff. When General Rajendra Chhetri left for 15 days tour on 30 June 2017 to United States, Chief of General Staff Lt. Gen. Baldev Raj Mahat was appointed Acting Chief of the Army Staff as per section 8(3). Similarly, then CGS Lt. Gen. Purna Chandra Thapa was appointed as the acting Chief of Army Staff on 8 August 2018 at the traditional last month leave of General Chhetri.

== Powers, duties and responsibilities ==
As per Section 9(1) of Army Act (2063) of Nepal, the Chief of Army Staff shall manage the armed forces under the instructions of the Government of Nepal and according to prevailing laws and acts. As per Section 9(2), the COAS shall submit an annual report on the management of Nepalese armed forces to the Government of Nepal on the Baisakh month of Hindu calendar.

== Removal ==
As per Section 11 (1 & 2) of the Army Act, COAS is normally retired on completion of 3 years or up to age of 61 years of the person, whichever is earlier. However, as per the section 11(3) of the same, the COAS can be removed by the President of Nepal if deemed necessary by Government of Nepal on the recommendation of Council of Ministers of Nepal.

== Chief of the Army Staff ==
No.	Portrait	Chief of Army Staff	Took office	Left office	Time in office	Unit of Commission	Ref.
1	Singha Pratap Shah OGDB, OTSP	General; Singha Pratap Shah OGDB, OTSP	15 May 1979	15 May 1983	4 years, 0 days	–	–
2	Arjun Narsingh Rana OGDB, OTSP	General; Arjun Narsingh Rana OGDB, OTSP	15 May 1983	15 May 1987	4 years, 0 days	–	–
3	Satchit Rana OGDB, OTSP	General; Satchit Rana OGDB, OTSP (1934–2007)	15 May 1987	15 May 1991	4 years, 0 days	Shreenath Battalion	–
4	Gadul Shamsher JB Rana OGDB, OTSP	General; Gadul Shamsher JB Rana OGDB, OTSP (1936–2016)	15 May 1991	4 May 1995	3 years, 354 days	–	
5	Dharmapaal Barsingh Thapa OGDB, OTSP	General; Dharmapaal Barsingh Thapa OGDB, OTSP (1936–2024)	15 May 1995	15 May 1999	4 years, 0 days	–	–
6	Prajwalla Shamsher JB Rana OGDB, OTSP	General; Prajwalla Shamsher JB Rana OGDB, OTSP	19 May 1999	9 September 2002	3 years, 113 days	–	–
7	Pyar Jung Thapa	General; Pyar Jung Thapa	10 September 2002	9 September 2006	3 years, 364 days	–	–
8	Rookmangad Katawal	General; Rookmangad Katawal (born 1948)	9 September 2006	9 September 2009	3 years, 0 days	Shreenath Battalion	–
9	Chhatra Man Singh Gurung	General; Chhatra Man Singh Gurung (born 1952)	9 September 2009	5 September 2012	2 years, 362 days	Shreenath Battalion	–
10	Gaurav Shumsher JB Rana	General; Gaurav Shumsher JB Rana (born 1955)	6 September 2012	10 September 2015	3 years, 4 days	Purano Gorakh Battalion	
11	Rajendra Chhetri	General; Rajendra Chhetri (born 1960)	10 September 2015	8 September 2018	2 years, 363 days	Rajdal Battalion	
12	Purna Chandra Thapa	General; Purna Chandra Thapa (born 1960)	9 September 2018	8 September 2021	2 years, 364 days	Gorakh Bahadur Battalion	
13	Prabhu Ram Sharma	General; Prabhu Ram Sharma (born 1964)	9 September 2021	8 September 2024	2 years, 365 days	Purano Gorakh Battalion	
14	Ashok Raj Sigdel	General; Ashok Raj Sigdel (born 1967)	9 September 2024	Incumbent	2 years, 7 days	Devidutta Battalion	

== Chief of General Staff ==
Chief of General Staff (CGS) was the deputy position of the Chief of Army Staff. The CGS was generally ranked as Lieutenant General (three star General). The chief of general staff was assigned to look after intelligence and operations in the Army. Now, the Vice Chief of Army Staff is the deputy position of the Chief of Army Staff.

No.	Portrait	Chief of General Staff	Took office	Left office	Time in office	Unit of Commission	Ref.
–	Rajendra Chhetri	General; Rajendra Chhetri (born 1960)	February 2015	July 2015	5 months	Rajdal Battalion	
–	Baldev Raj Mahat	Lieutenant General; Baldev Raj Mahat	July 2015	4 November 2017	2 years, 4 months	–	
–	Purna Chandra Thapa	General; Purna Chandra Thapa (born 1960)	4 November 2017	8 August 2018	277 days	Gorakh Bahadur Battalion	
–	Hemanta Raj Kunwar	Lieutenant General; Hemanta Raj Kunwar	16 September 2018	23 April 2019	219 days	Naya Gorakh Battalion	
40	Sarad Giri	Lieutenant General; Sarad Giri	23 April 2019	20 June 2020	1 year, 58 days	Rajdal Battalion	
-	Prabhu Ram Sharma	Lieutenant General; Prabhu Ram Sharma (born 1964)	2020	9 August 2021	-	Purano Gorakh Battalion	

== Bibliography ==
- Acharya, Baburam (2012), Acharya, Shri Krishna (ed.), Janaral Bhimsen Thapa : Yinko Utthan Tatha Pattan (in Nepali), Kathmandu: Education Book House, p. 228, ISBN 9789937241748
- Adhikari, Indra (2015), Military and Democracy in Nepal, Routledge, ISBN 9781317589068
- Nepal, Gyanmani (2007), Nepal ko Mahabharat (in Nepali) (3rd ed.), Kathmandu: Sajha, p. 314, ISBN 9789993325857
- Oldfield, Henry Ambrose (1880), Sketches from Nipal, Vol 1, vol. 1, London: W.H. Allan & Co.
- Pradhan, Kumar L. (2012), Thapa Politics in Nepal: With Special Reference to Bhim Sen Thapa, 1806–1839, New Delhi: Concept Publishing Company, p. 278, ISBN 9788180698132
- Khatri, Shiva Ram (1999), Nepal Army Chiefs: Short Biographical Sketches, University of Michigan: Sira Khatri
