= Kul Bahadur Khadka =

Nepalese general (1951–2020)

Kul Bahadur Khadka (1951 – 28 July 2020) was an officer in the Nepali Army and reached the rank of lieutenant general. He was appointed as the acting chief of Army Staff by Prime Minister Prachanda on May 3, 2009, when he replaced Chief of Army Staff General Rookmangud Katawal, but Katawal was reinstated by President Dr. Ram Baran Yadav on the same night.

Khadka was born in 1951 in a simple family in Lamjung, West Nepal. He joined the Royal Nepalese Army in 1970 and was commissioned from the Royal Military Academy Sandhurst in 1972. Following his commissioning he went on to finish his Platoon Commander's Battle Course in Warminster, UK. Khadka was also a graduate of Staff College from Camberley UK. One of Khadka's course mates was Moshe Ya'alon, who later went on to become the Chief of IDF and is currently the Israeli Deputy Prime Minister. Khadka attended ND course in National Defense College, Islamabad, Pakistan (August 1996 to July 1997) which is a high profile military institution (now renamed as National Defense University (NDU). One of his course mates Kaleem Saadat subsequently became Chief of Air Staff (Pakistan Air Force). He held a Masters in Political Science from Tribhuvan University.
