= Terry Gunawardena =

Sri Lankan Air Chief Marshal

Air Chief Marshal Terrence Gunawardena (Terry) VSV
- Military career
- Allegiance: Sri Lanka
- Branch: Sri Lanka Air Force
- Service years: 1959-1996
- Rank: Air Chief Marshal
- Unit: No. 2 Squadron SLAF
- Commands: Commander of the Sri Lankan Air Force

Air Chief Marshal Makalandage Johnny Terrence "Terry" De Silva Gunawardena, VSV (-2014) was the 8th Commander of the Sri Lankan Air Force.

Educated at Wesley College, Colombo, Gunawardena joined the Royal Ceylon Air Force on 31 December 1959 and was commissioned a pilot officer in 1961. He served as a squadron pilot in both the No 1 Squadron and No. 2 Squadron. He was one of the first pilots qualified in fighter jets, flying BAC Jet Provosts and MiG-17s. He served as Commanding Officer, No 2 Squadron and Commandant, Air Force Academy, China Bay. He attended RAF Staff College, Bracknell and National Defence College, New Delhi. He was appointed Chief of Staff of the SLAF in March 1986. On 1 August 1991 he was appointed Commander of the Air Force and promoted to the rank of Air Marshal. He reintroduced fighter jets to the SLAF by acquiring F-7 Skybolts and increased its light attack capability by acquiring FMA IA 58 Pucarás. He added Mil Mi-17 heavy transport helicopters to the SLAF fleet. His tenner saw the introduction of zonal commands in the SLAF. He retired on 16 February 1996 and was promoted to the rank of Air Chief Marshal. He was succeeded by Oliver Ranasinghe.

Military offices
Preceded by Andibuduge Fernando	Commander of the Sri Lankan Air Force; 1991-1996	Succeeded by Oliver Ranasinghe
