= Kiran Shumsher Rana =

Nepalese army officer (1916–1983)

His Excellency General Kiran Shamsher Jang Bahadur Rana
- अतिरथी श्री किरण शम्शेर जङ्गबहादुर राणा

Commander in Chief of Royal Nepalese Army
- In office 1951–1956
- Preceded by: Kaiser Shumsher Jang Bahadur Rana
- Succeeded by: Toran Shumsher Jung Bahadur Rana

Personal details
- Born: October 1916 Jawalakhel Durbar
- Died: November 1983 (aged 67)
- Parents: Juddha Shamsher Jang Bahadur Rana (father); Sahila Maharani (mother)
- Awards: Order of the Star of Nepal (Nepal Tara), Member 1st Class; Order of Om Rama Patta, Member; Order of Tri Shakti Patta (Three Divine Powers), Member 1st Class; Order of Gorkha Dakshina Bahu (Gurkha Right Arm), Member 1st Class; Assam-Burma Medal (1945); Honorary Knight Commander of the Order of the British Empire (KBE); Commander of Legion of Merit (American Order, 2nd class); Honorary Knight Commander of the Royal Victorian Order (KCVO); Mentioned in Despatches for distinguished service in 1943 (U.K.); 1939–1945 Star (1945); Burma Star (1945).; Defence Medal (1945); War Medal (1945)

Military service
- Allegiance: Nepal
- Rank: General
- Battles/wars: World War II

Commander in Chief Kiran Shamsher Jang Bahadur Rana KBE KCVO (1916–1983) was a Nepalese army officer. He served as the Royal Nepalese Army's Commander-in-Chief from 1951–1956 and as the Nepalese ambassador to the United Kingdom from 1973–1977. Over the course of thirty years, he served as Aide-de-camp General to King Tribhuvan, King Mahendra and King Birendra.

== Biography ==
Kiran Shamsher Jang Bahadur Rana was born in October 1916 at the Jawalakhel Durbar, son of the Maharaja Juddha Shamsher Jang Bahadur Rana, Prime Minister of Nepal and his fifth wife, Sahila Maharani.

=== Career ===
He joined the Nepali Army in 1933 and during World War II, he commanded ‘the famous’ Mahendra Dal Battalion of the Nepalese Army in 1940, sent in aid of the Allied Forces in the North-West Frontier and the Eastern Active Service Area in India. For his service he was mentioned in despatches. He was promoted to the rank of Major General in 1943 and decorated with the Order of Nepal Tara (2nd Class), then sent as a liaison officer to the Eastern Command and the 14th Army in India.

Following the end of World War II, he was a member of the Nepalese contingent at the London Victory Parade of 1946 and of the first Nepalese Goodwill Mission to the United States. On return of the troops in 1948, he was awarded the Nepal Pratap Vardhak by the government of Nepal, and KBE by the British government. Outside of the military, he served the Nepalese government in other roles between 1946 and 1950, including Director General of Health, Transport and Communications, the Royal Mint, and as Chief Justice for a brief period.

During the 1950 insurgency in Nepal, General Kiran lead a peace mission to the eastern parts. In recognition of his services, he was appointed Deputy Commander-in-Chief of the Royal Nepalese Army and awarded the most refulgent order of Nepal Supradipta Manyabara Nepal Tara (1st Class). He was appointed Commander-in-Chief of the Royal Nepalese Army the next year. General Kiran then reorganized the Royal Nepalese Army and was awarded with the order of Trishakti-Patta (1st Class).

During the reign of King Tribhuvan, he was appointed as Aide-de-camp General to the king and decorated with the order of Suprasiddha Prabal Gorkha Dakshin Bahu (1st Class). (He subsequently served as ADC General to the following two kings of Nepal.) In 1954 and 1955, he served on the Coronation Committee of King Mahendra.

General Kiran made an official visit to Malaya in 1955 at the invitation of Commander-in-Chief, Far Eastern Command (Land Forces) of the British Army and inspected the Gurkha regiments stationed there. The following year, he retired from the Army and was appointed Minister of State for Planning and Development in the cabinet of Prime Minister Tanka Prashad Acharya. In 1957, General Kiran was appointed Vice President of the 1st Planning Commission.

He took on duties outside of Nepal later in life, appointed to a six-year term as a member of Rajya Sabha in 1963 and later serving as the Ambassador Extraordinary and Plenipotentiary of Nepal to the Court of St. James's from 1973 to 1977.

=== Marriage and children ===
General Kiran married Yuba Rajya Lakshmi in 1936. The couple had five children:

- Teeka Rajya Laxmi Simha (d. 1993)
- Prashiddha Shumsher Jung Bahadur Rana
- Prabal Shumsher Jung Bahadur Rana
- Pramode Shumsher Jung Bahadur Rana
- Subodh Shumsher Jung Bahadur Rana

=== Death and afterward ===
General Kiran died in November 1983 in Kathmandu, and was cremated with full military honors at Arya Ghat, Pashupatinath.

== Honours ==
=== Nepalese Decorations ===
- Order of Pratap Vardhak (Ne. Va., Outstanding Service Decoration)
- Order of the Star of Nepal (Nepal Tara), Member 1st Class
- Order of Om Rama Patta, Member
- Order of Tri Shakti Patta (Three Divine Powers), Member 1st Class
- Order of Gorkha Dakshina Bahu (Gurkha Right Arm), Member 1st Class
- Assam-Burma Medal (1945)

=== Foreign Decorations ===
- Honorary Knight Commander of the Order of the British Empire (KBE)
- Commander of Legion of Merit (American Order, 2nd class)
- Honorary Knight Commander of the Royal Victorian Order (KCVO)
- Mentioned in Despatches for distinguished service in 1943 (U.K.)
- 1939–1945 Star (1945)
- Burma Star (1945).
- Defence Medal (1945)
- War Medal (1945)
