= Rookmangud Katawal =

Nepali Army general

General Rookmangud Katawal
- महारथी श्री रुकमाङ्गद कटवाल
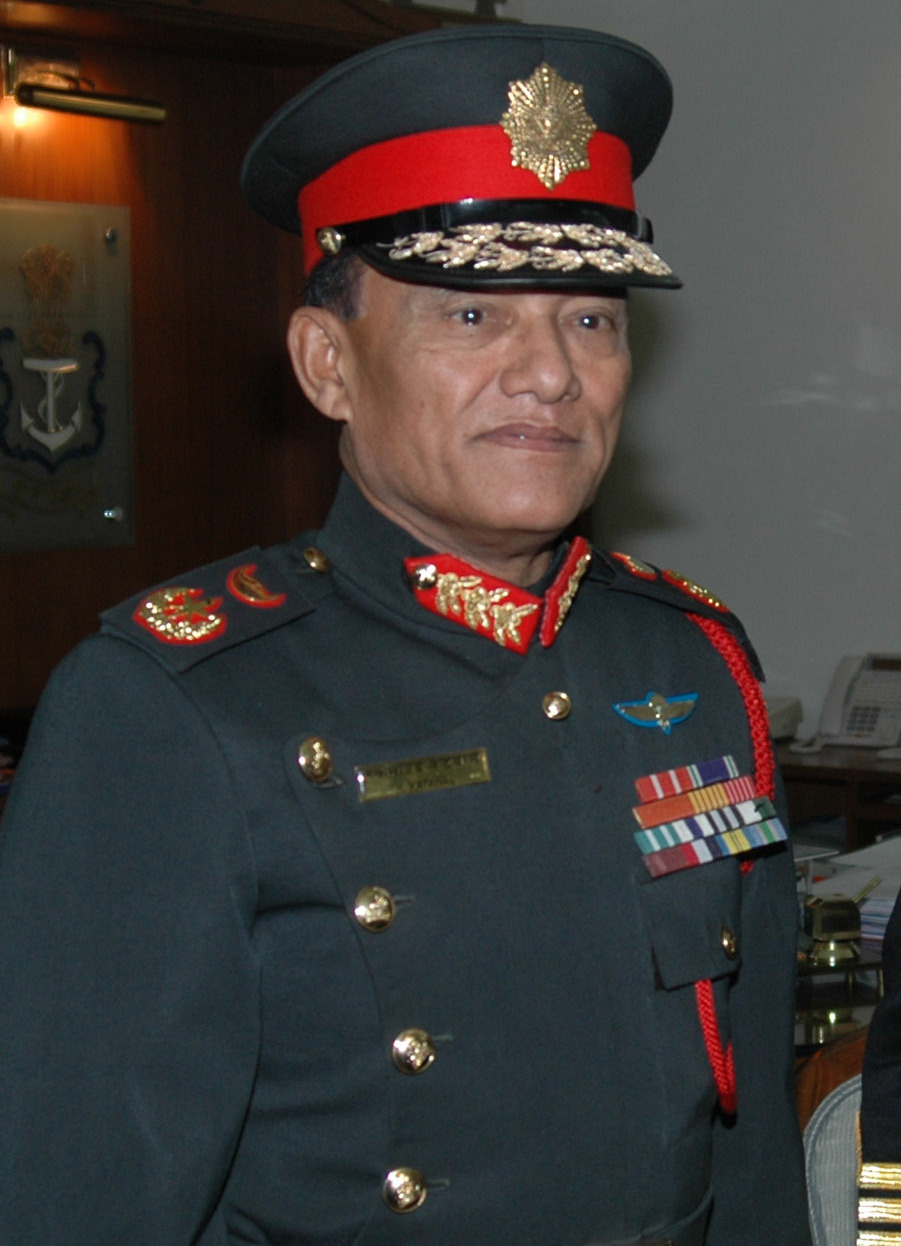
- General Katawal in New Delhi (2007)

Chief of Army Staff of Nepal Army
- In office 10 September 2006 – August, 2009
- President: Ram Baran Yadav
- Preceded by: Pyar Jung Thapa
- Succeeded by: Chhatra Man Singh Gurung

Personal details
- Born: 12 December 1948 (age 77) Okhaldhunga, Nepal
- Spouse: Uma Katawal
- Awards: Birendra Prajatantra Bhaskar Class II; Gorkha Dakshin Bahu

Military service
- Allegiance: Nepal
- Branch/service: Nepali Army
- Years of service: 1969–2009
- Rank: General
- Commands: Shree Kalidhoj Battalion (1976–1977); United Nation Interim Force in Lebanon (UNIFIL) (1988); Shree Pashupati Prashad Battalion (1990–1993); Commandant of the Royal Nepalese Military Academy (1993); Adjutant General (AG) of the Directorate of Military Intelligence (DMI) (1999)

General Rookmangud Katawal is a former Nepalese Army general, who served as the Chief of Army Staff of the Nepal Army from 2006 to 2009. General Katawal has come across controversy after the then prime minister Pushpa Kamal Dahal unilaterally decided to sack him on May 3, 2009.

During the Nepalese Civil War, he was alleged to have committed many human rights atrocities, war crimes and crime against humanity, yet faced no court proceedings.

== Early life and education ==
Rookmangud Katawal was born in Okhaldhunga District, Nepal on 12 December 1948, to Khadgadhoj Katawal and his wife. After impressing the then King Mahendra by reciting a poem of the National Poet Madhav Prasad Ghimire during the monarch's official visit, Katawal was brought to Kathmandu at the age of 8 years and looked after by King Mahendra himself. After residing at the then COAS General Toran Shumsher's residence for about 15 days along with King Mahendra's other 'adopted sons', at the age of 10 years, he was enrolled at the Pharping Boarding School. After completing 5th grade, he was directly transferred to 7th grade due to his impressive academic endeavor.

However, Katawal along with several other students were kicked out of the Pharping Boarding High School for involvement in a protest against the 'corporal punishment' which was given out by the school's authorities to the students then. Later, Katawal was enrolled in another school with the help of the same teacher who had expelled Katawal from Pharping in which he completed his high school.

== Military career ==
=== Junior Officer ===
Katawal was commissioned into Shree Shreenath Battalion (Infantry) of the then Royal Nepalese Army (RNA) on 20 December 1969, after graduating from the Indian National Defense Academy. Katawal holds a Bachelor of Arts degree from Tribhuwan University, and a master's degree in National Defence from the Quaid-i-Azam University, Pakistan. Katawal is also the Distinguished International Honour Graduate of the US Special Forces Course and has earned the coveted Gideon in the US Ranger Course. He is also a graduate of the Army Command and Staff College, Camberley, UK; the Senior Command Course, India; and the National Defense College, Pakistan. In 1973, he served as an instructor at the Royal Nepalese Army School. In the same year, he donned the blue beret to serve in the United Nations Emergency Force (UNEF) in the Suez Canal area.

=== Senior Officer ===
Between 1976 and 1977, Katawal commanded the Independent Company- Shree Kalidhoj- which is currently a battalion. Between 1983 and 1986, he served as the Nepalese Government's Liaison Officer to the Brigade of Gurkhas of the British Army and Government of Hong Kong following several key staff appointments.

In 1988, he was appointed the Chief Military Personnel Officer of the United Nation Interim Force in Lebanon (UNIFIL). In 1990, he took over command of Shree Pashupati Prashad Battalion. In 1993, he took post as the commandant of the Royal Nepalese Military Academy, following Service in the Research and Development Wing at the Army HQ.

In 1996, he was promoted to Brigadier General. He holds the distinction of having commanded three consecutive Brigades, two infantry and one Special Forces. In 1999, he was appointed as director of military intelligence. In 2001, he was promoted to major general. He then took over as Adjutant General (AG) of the Nepalese Army. On December 29, 2001, General Katawal was appointed the first co-coordinator of the National Security Council Secretariat. He has participated in various conferences and seminars around the globe concerning security, peacekeeping and planning fields, such as Multilateral Planner's conference in Romania and the International Symposium Course on Asian Pacific Security in China.

He commanded the then Western Division on combat operation in the peak of the counter insurgency effort between December 2003 and August 2004. He was promoted to the rank of lieutenant general on 10 September 2004, and took over as Chief of General Staff. He was also ‘Colonel Commandant’ of his old battalion: Shree Pashupati Prashad.

=== Maoist Insurgency in Nepal ===
==== Major General of the Nepal Army ====
In a telephone conversation with the then Ambassador Michael E. Malinowski in 2003, Major General Rookmangud Katawal, reported that the Cabinet was planning how to respond to the morning incidents. Katawal indicated that, with the King's support, the government would likely re-declare the Maoists a terrorist group, resurrect the suspended anti-terrorist act, and request Interpol blue-corner notices for Maoist leaders. Katawal also said, although the ministers had discussed the possibility of nationwide state of emergency, they were not likely to declare it. Katawal sought support from the international community for the government's efforts to combat the insurgency. The Ambassador counseled against the declaration of a state of emergency at the time.

In 2003, Major General Rookmangud Katawal, Nepal's National Security Advisor, had told the then Ambassador Michael E. Malinowski that the Maoist leadership twice had contacted DFID's Wood to ask for details of DFID's ongoing and future programs and plans in Nepal. On both occasions Wood refused to comply with the Maoist request. Katawal did not provide the source of his information.

===== Mission Kotwada =====
Major General Rookmangud Katawal had been appointed as the commander to lead the Unified Armed Forces of Nepal during Mission Kotwada by tricking the then Chief of Army Staff Pyar Jung Thapa and the then King of Nepal Gyanendra Shah. The mission was very important, as it had to ensure the successful tour of the King Gyanendra Shah. Being accompanied by another senior army officer and several other military and police personnel, he ordered mortars to be fired consecutively to scare the Maoist rebels into retreating and ceasing fire which failed. However, upon requesting air support from a nearby military unit, the mission succeeded after successive missiles fired from the helicopter forced the rebels to escape. After a two-hour march up the hill in Kotwada, the unit led by Katawal found the place deserted.

==== Lieutenant General of Nepal Army ====
===== Civilian leadership should explain counter-insurgency plan =====
On January 20, Lt. General Katawal, Royal Nepalese Army (RNA) Chief of General Staff, told Ambassador James F. Moriarty that he was worried the government did not have a unified strategy for tackling the Maoist insurgency. Katawal reiterated that there was no purely military solution to the insurgency; the army could only create space for political negotiations. He noted that the civilian government should lead the effort to inform its citizens about Nepal's overall plan to tackle the insurgency. Katawal stressed that a civilian government had to explain to the people what the military was doing, especially why the government needed to restrict civil liberties.

Katawal had explained that the then Home Minister Kamal Thapa had tried to work with the political parties on January 19 to avert the need for a day long curfew on January 20, the day Parties planned to hold mass demonstrations in Kathmandu. Katawal noted that the government had confirmed evidence that the Maoists intended to infiltrate the Parties' demonstration; the Maoists had already brought automatic weapons into the Kathmandu Valley, and had attacked police stations in the valley. He pointed out that, during their rule, the Parties had placed restrictions on citizens for security reasons but now were unwilling to accept those restrictions. The ambassador agreed that Nepal needed a national consensus on how to address the insurgency. The ambassador told Katawal that he had met with the foreign minister, Home Minister and vice chairman to urge the government to postpone elections, reach out to the parties, and declare a cease-fire to create space for the legitimate democratic forces to discuss a counter-insurgency plan.

Katawal asserted that the Maoists skillfully exploited the lack of government vision by using the political parties themselves to create tension among the legitimate democratic forces. Katawal admitted that the Maoists' strategy had been "successful to an extent," but added that the political parties should learn from their mistake of aligning with the Maoists through the 12-point understanding. He noted the irony of the Parties linking with the Maoists: it was the Parties themselves who first labeled the Maoists as "terrorists" when the Parties were in power. Katawal believed the Parties and the Maoists had reached an agreement to pressure the King and the army. He stressed that the army had no political aims, saying that the RNA army "obey any constitutional government." Katawal stated that the parties, especially the Nepali Congress party, were beginning to feel trapped, but acknowledged that it was "hard for the Parties to back down publicly." He added it was "time for the state to take steps so political parties could come to the negotiating table." Katawal hoped that the international community could urge the leaders of the political parties "to understand the gravity of the situation" and to understand that the army was not the enemy of democracy.

He added that Nepal's monarchy and political parties have, over the past ten years, viewed the Maoist insurgency primarily as a chip to be played in their political games; at various times, each of the major Parties and the King have used the Maoists to advance their own interests vis-à-vis the other legitimate political actors. Thus, there has been no broad agreement on a counter-insurgency strategy. They had reached the stage where, Katawal added, if the legitimate democratic forces do not stand together, there is a very real risk that the Maoists will succeed in their goal of forming a totalitarian state. Katawal's readiness to assure the ambassador that the RNA had no political ambition might be an indication that the military understand that the King must reach out to the political parties in order to ensure implementation of an effective counter-insurgency plan.

=== Chief of Army Staff (COAS) of the Nepal Army ===
The then prime minister Girija Prasad Koirala swore in Rookmangud Katawal as the new chief of Army Staff on September 18, 2006. Katawal, who had repeatedly affirmed his intention to loyally serve the democratic Government of Nepal (GON) received cabinet approval on September 5, becoming the first Commander-in-chief of the Nepal Army from a common family; not from one of the families that have traditionally the chief of army in Nepalese Army like "Shah", "Basnet", "Thapa", "Pande" or "Rana". After several unsuccessful political attempts from other influential political leaders to appoint Kul Bahadur Khadka, Katawal was appointed. Some had even conspired to bring back former Lt. General Chitra Bahadur (CB) Gurung (retired) and appoint him as the COAS instead of Katawal.

==== Human rights allegations ====
The government's decision to appoint Katawal as the Army Chief came in the face of complaints by human rights activists and some politicians that his human rights record made him unfit for the position. Their criticism focused on Katawal's tenure as commander of the mid-western division headquarters from December 2003 to September 2004 and his actions during the people's movement in April 2006. According to the defense secretary, there is no plan by the government of Nepal to issue a formal SIPDIS in response to the human rights accusations against Katawal. Whether the High-Level Probe Commission will issue any findings on the General's activities remains a mystery.

===== Katawal and his democratic bona fides =====
Since the people's movement in April, Katawal, like outgoing COAS Gen. Thapa, had been consistent in affirming his loyalty to Nepal's democratic leadership. He reaffirmed the same to embassy official in a conversation on September 19. He had appeared on several occasions before the State Affairs Committee, the parliamentary committee tasked with oversight of the Defense Ministry. The chairman of that committee told embassy official recently that he had been completely satisfied with Katawal's cooperation. Katawal reported to Prime Minister Koirala on two accounts. The PM is the commander-in-chief. The Defense Ministry (MOD) was in the process, with U.S. and U.K. assistance, of building its capacity to manage and give direction to the army. That responsibility was previously of the Palace; the Defense Ministry was only a facade.

Although the criticisms Katawal face seems to have died down in these days, a number of human rights activists and several members of Parliament mostly on the far left began raising their voices as soon as Katawal was appointed. On September 4, a group of 16 leaders of various human rights organizations sent a letter to UN Secretary General Annan denouncing the appointment of Katawal as the new COAS. The letter alleged that Katawal had been involved in "documented gross human right violations." The letter claimed that Katawal had been involved in torture, extrajudicial executions, and forced disappearances. The Informal Sector Service Center (INSEC), a leading Nepali human rights NGO, subsequently shared detailed information with the embassy about Katawal's alleged human rights abuses or those that may have occurred under his command. Only one allegation directly involved Katawal. The rest were on a chain-of-command basis.

===== INSEC report =====
According to INSEC, Katawal allegedly threatened in April 2004 to kill a journalist who had reported on a deadly aerial attack on a school in the mid-Western region in which 7 people died and 30 people were injured. INSEC also listed 64 individual gross violations of human rights that Nepali security forces committed in the mid-Western region from December 29, 2003, to September 10, 2004, while Katawal was the regional divisional commander. The Nepal Armed Police Force and the Nepal Police were operating at that time under a unified command which was headed by the army. Katawal also faced unspecified charges of violating human rights for attempting to suppress the people's movement in April 2006. He testified to the High-Level Probe Commission against these charges early August. The commission has not yet made any of its findings public.

===== No government rebuttal planned =====
Nepal Army sources have told post that the army has no intention of responding to the human rights allegations against Katawal. It would, in their view, be inappropriate. That task, Army sources believe, is one for the civilian leadership. Defense Secretary Upreti, the senior civil servant in the Ministry of Defense, who reports directly to PM and Defense Minister Koirala, told embassy officials on September 18 that he is unaware of any intention by his Ministry or the prime minister to address these allegations against the COAS.

===== Assessing the allegations =====
The unspecified charges against Katawal for his role in April 2006 do not yet appear to substantiate such drastic USG action in the absence of a commission report. The most troubling accusations concern human rights abuses that occurred while Katawal was division commander in mid-Western Nepal was during the first nine months of 2004. However, Embassy sources indicate he exercised maximum restraint in conducting operations, mindful of minimizing collateral damage.

Office of the High Commissioner for Human Rights (OHCHR) representatives had said on September 19, that it was generally pleased with the progress army had made in the past three years. OHCHR also shared on September 19 that it does not plan to investigate Katawal.

==== Fear of Maoist Coup d'état ====
Katawal feared reprisals against his office once the Maoists were part of an interim government. He threatened that if the political parties or Maoists were to "touch" him, elements within the Nepal army would revolt, referring to what would happen if the Maoists attempted extra-constitutional action against him. Katawal's senior aide, Brigadier General Pandey, later caveated Katawal's assertion, suggesting that elements within the Nepal army would indeed oppose such a move, but not revolt.

Katawal stated that as long as the Maoists came into mainstream political power by legitimate means, the Nepal Army would "nod and salute." If the Maoists were to seize power illegitimately, he implied, the army would not accept it and would be forced to act.

==== Message to King Gyanendra ====
In November 2006, General Rookmangud Katawal had claimed the desire of the Former King Gyanendra to make a "comeback" as "suicidal," declaring, "as long as I am COAS, such an alliance between the Nepal Army and the King will not happen."

Katawal had instructed the then major general Dharmala to tell King Gyanendra to make amends with the prime minister and to acknowledge that there was no chance of a political comeback. Katawal also claimed that, through Dharmala, he had told the King that if he was interested in retaining the monarchy, he should abdicate in favor of his grandson. Katawal also had Dharmala tell the King that Indian actors who were telling King Gyanendra the Government of India wanted to see a "royal comeback" were blowing smoke; the Indian government was content leaving the future of the monarchy to the Nepali people.

==== Integration of Maoist Combatants in Nepal Army after disarmament of former rebels ====
COAS Rookmangud Katawal had stated that he opposed integrating Maoist combatants into the Nepal Army for a period of "five years." Katawal held the view that "Reintegration is disintegration." He estimated it would take that long for democracy to take root in Nepal. Five years would allow the Maoists time to turn in all their weapons and prove their democratic bona fides. He said he had stressed to Prime Minister G.P. Koirala on July 1, 2007, that integration would destroy the Army and deprive the political parties of an institution to fall back on if the Maoists attempted to seize power. He had warned Koirala, "Don't toss away the Army or you will have nothing to fall back on" if the Maoists try to seize power. In response, the Prime Minister had assured him he would do nothing to demoralize the Army. Katawal pointed out that the NA remained a regular, disciplined, and professional army; integrating Maoist combatants, whom he described as "thugs, criminals and terrorists", into the Nepal Army would destroy the Army. He claimed it would also lead the United Nations to stop deploying Nepali soldiers as peacekeepers. Katawal had opted for an alternative method to provide lethal military assistance to the Nepal Army; that Nepali peacekeepers could go to their postings in Haiti or other places without weapons. Then, upon arrival, the U.S. could provide weapons and ammunition to the group for their peacekeeping duties. When the group returned to Nepal at the end of their tour, they could bring the weapons and ammunition back with them. Katawal noted that this solution would avoid upsetting the Maoists and would allow lethal support to arrive without the political complications involved.

==== Sacking in May, 2009 ====
General Katawal had been fiercely resisting group integration of Maoist rebels into the Nepal Army and has been at odds with Maoist government on several other issues. Controversy surrounding his relationship with the ruling government, largely focused on recruiting issues, the increase in tenure of 8 Nepalese generals and the boycott of the Nepal Army in the Sports Tournament led to his brief sacking on May 3, 2009. It was also rumored that he had a strong backing from the Indian government. Protests in response to his sacking included the withdrawal of the Communist Party of Nepal (Unified Marxist-Leninist) from the ruling coalition government. The CPN-Maoists at the head of the coalition then named the then Lt. General Kul Bahadur Khadka as a replacement COAS. Shortly afterwards, President Dr. Ram Baran Yadav overrode both decisions and ordered him to continue his service by sending a letter at 11:45 pm on the same day to make his decision official. This resulted in Prime Minister Prachanda's resignation and the collapse of the government.

== Personal life ==
Gen. Katawal goes in for basketball, racket games and golf. His hobbies include reading, hiking and travelling. He is also a social worker. He is involved in the development of a high school (currently a campus) in his home village in Okhaldhunga District. Katawal has penned many Nepalese folk, patriotic and popular song. Gen. Katawal is decorated with Birendra Prajatantra Bhaskar, Second Class and has been awarded a host of other decorations and medals in his 40 years of service. Gen. Katawal is married to Uma Katawal, a career graduate teacher who has taught at the Army Campus for 20 years. They have two children together: Shubhangad and Nepolina Katawal.

== Post-retirement ==
After his retirement from the Nepalese Army in 2009, Katawal has been involved in many public functions and private ceremonies. He has travelled widely, attending conferences and talk programs both inside and outside the country. He enjoys interacting, discussing and debating with people about current and past issues related to society. He has traveled to different states of the US and Canada to interact with the Nepalese communities. He has interacted in Johns Hopkins's university and Harvard with such communities. He has also attended international conference in Hiroshima university and a seminar in Seoul. He has visited UK for interaction. He has visited India many times accepting invitations of Vivekananda International foundation, India foundation etc. He went to Tel-Aviv to participate in the world summit for counter-terrorism.

=== The Katawal Trust ===
In 2074 B.S., Rookmangud Katawal chaired "the Katawal Trust" established to run volunteering program for increase in quality of education of children in Nepal.

Military offices
Preceded by Pyar Jung Thapa	Chief of Army Staff of the Nepali Army; 2006–2009	Succeeded by Chhatra Man Singh Gurung
