= Pyar Jung Thapa =

Former Chief of the Nepalese Army

General Pyar Jung Thapa
- महारथी श्री प्यार जङ्ग थापा

Chief of Army Staff of Nepal Army
- In office 9 September 2002 – 9 September 2006
- Monarch: King Gyanendra
- Prime Minister: Sher Bahadur Deuba; Surya Bahadur Thapa; Girija Prasad Koirala
- Preceded by: Prajwalla Shamsher JB Rana
- Succeeded by: Rookmangud Katawal

Personal details
- Relations: Pratap Singh Rao Gaekwad (grandfather of son-in-law)

Military service
- Allegiance: Kingdom of Nepal
- Rank: General

Pyar Jung Thapa (Nepali: प्यार जङ्ग थापा) was Chief of Army Staff (COAS) of the Nepalese Army from 9 September 2002 to 9 September 2006 during the Maoist insurgency. In 2006, he discussed opting out from the position of COAS for Rookmangud Katawal with Girija Prasad Koirala. Later, Rookmangud succeeded Thapa.

Thapa has faced alleged human rights violation claims. He was investigated by Commission for the Investigation of Abuse of Authority for abusing government funds during People's Movement-II (Jana Aandolan-II). He was criticized for oppressing pro-democracy agitators. He was also accused of using excessive security forces that resulted in the death of 21 people during the protest. However, he later took the initiative to negotiate with the Seven Party Alliance (SPA) to quell the distress.

He is connected to the Gaekwad dynasty by the marriage of his daughter Pragyashree Thapa to Pratapsinh Sangramsinh Gaekwad, grandson of the last Maharaja of Baroda, Pratap Singh Rao Gaekwad.

Thapa holds the view that Nepal should be a Hindu State. He believes that Hinduism is the thread that has tied Nepalese people together during times of crisis. He has also said the major political parties have committed an error by not holding a referendum to decide whether or not Nepal should be a Hindu State. He also believes that the Nepali Constitution was rushed; the major parties should have met the Madhesi people halfway.

Military offices
Preceded by Prajwalla Shamsher J.B. Rana	Chief of Army Staff of the Nepali Army; 2003–2006	Succeeded by Rookmangud Katawal
