= Ashok Raj Sigdel =

Nepalese army chief

General Ashok Raj Sigdel
- महारथी श्री अशोक राज सिग्देल
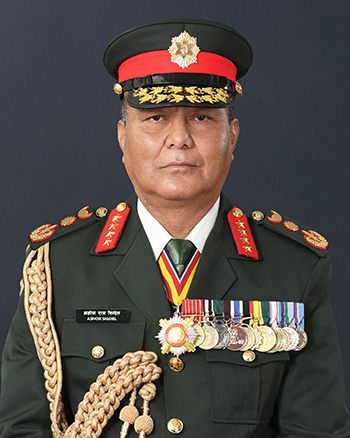
- Portrait of General Sigdel

Chief of the Army Staff, Nepal
- Incumbent
- Assumed office 9 September 2024
- President: Ram Chandra Paudel
- Deputy: Pradeep Jung K.C. as Vice Chief of Army Staff
- Preceded by: Prabhu Ram Sharma

Personal details
- Born: 1 February 1967 (age 59) Rupandehi, Nepal
- Spouse: Nita Sigdel
- Children: Ashutosh Sigdel (son)
- Parent: Bishwa Raj Sigdel (father)
- Profession: Military officer

Military service
- Allegiance: Nepal
- Branch/service: Nepal Army
- Years of service: 1987 – present
- Rank: General

General Ashok Raj Sigdel (born 1 February 1967) is a Nepali military officer, currently serving as the Chief of the Army Staff (COAS) of the Nepali Army since 9 September 2024. He assumed office after taking the oath from the President of Nepal, Ram Chandra Paudel, on 9 September 2024. He succeeded General Prabhu Ram Sharma. Sigdel was also conferred the honorary rank of General of the Indian Army by the President of India, Droupadi Murmu.

== Early life and education ==
Ashok Raj Sigdel was born on 1 February 1967 in Bhairahawa, Rupandehi District, Nepal. He comes from a middle-class family. His father, Bishwa Raj Sigdel, originally came from Tanahun District and later relocated the family to Taulihawa in Kapilvastu District before finally settling in Bhairahawa in Rupandehi District. He grew up as one of five siblings in a modest household shaped by these regional relocations.

He holds a bachelor's degree from the Army Command and Staff College in Shivapuri and from China's National Defense University. Additionally, he has completed the Higher and Management Course at the Army War College and the Defense Management Course in India. He also holds a master's degree in strategic studies from China's National Defense University and an MA from Tribhuvan University.

== Career ==
He was commissioned into the Nepal Army in 1987. He has previously served in key senior staff appointments, including Director of the Directorate of Military Operations, Director General of the Department of Staff Duties, Policy & Plans, Inspector General, Master General of Ordnance, Acting Chief of Staff and Chief of General Staff. He has served in former Yugoslavia, Tajikistan, and Liberia as part of UN Peacekeeping Operations.

=== Gen Z protests ===
His role during the 2025 Nepalese Gen Z protests prevented further bloodshed of protestors. He later helped facilitate terms with transition of power from the then Prime Minister K. P. Sharma Oli to the new Interim Prime Minister Sushila Karki and he also included the leaders the protest to come to the table for dialogue.

He attended the Beijing Xiangshan Forum in September 2026.
