= Rajendra Chhetri =

Chief of Army Staff of Nepal (born 1960)

General Rajendra Chhetri
- महारथी श्री राजेन्द्र क्षत्री
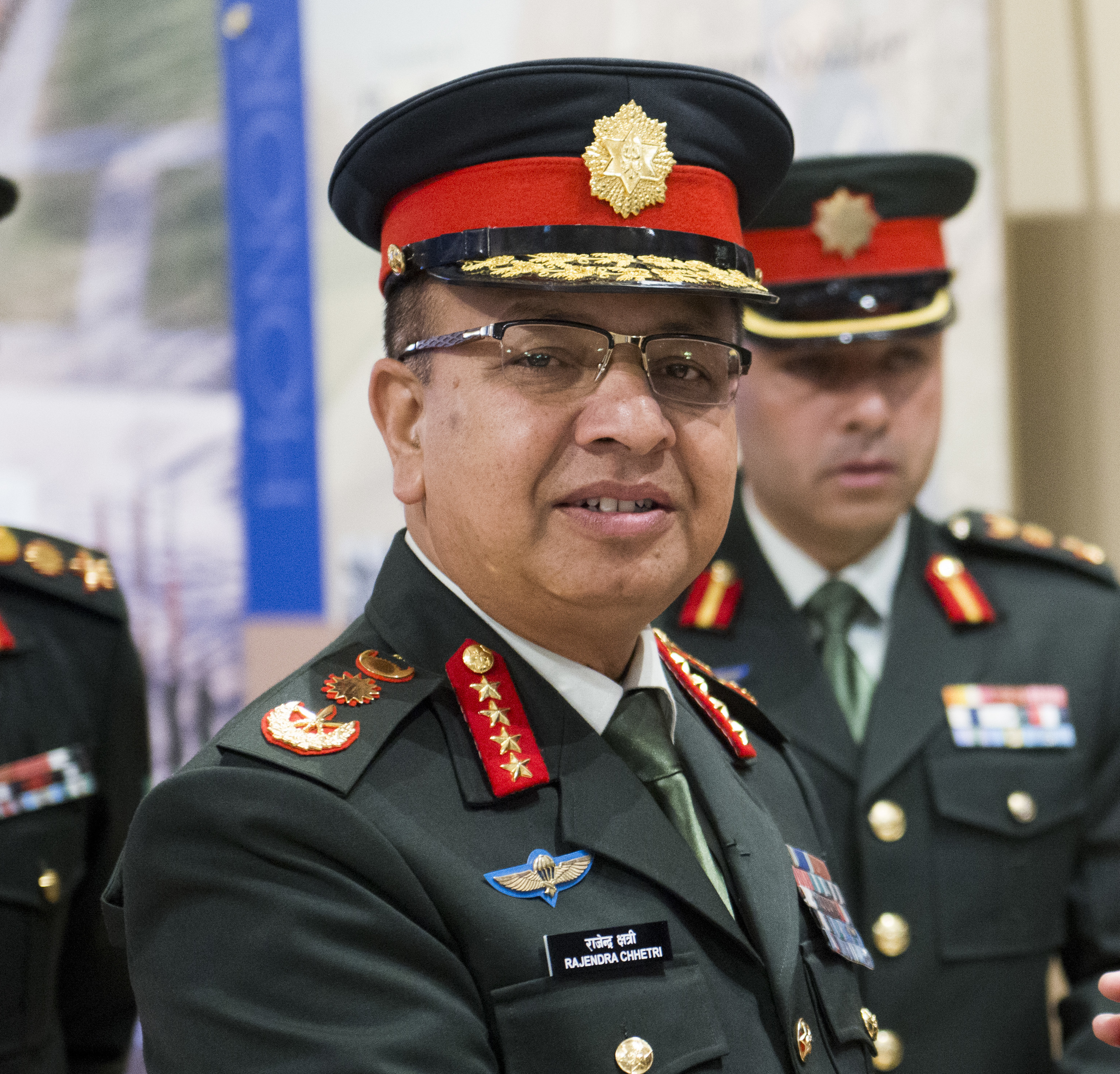

Chief of Army Staff of Nepal Army
- In office 10 September 2015 – 9 September 2018
- President: Bidhya Devi Bhandari
- Deputy: Purna Chandra Thapa as Chief of General Staff
- Preceded by: Gaurav Shumsher JB Rana
- Succeeded by: Purna Chandra Thapa

Personal details
- Born: Rajendra Khatri Chhetri राजेन्द्र खत्री क्षत्री November 15, 1960 (age 65) Chok Chisapani, Tanahun District

Military service
- Years of service: 1978–2018
- Rank: General
- Commands: Rajdal Battalion, Jagadal Battalion, No. 7th Brigade, No. 3 Brigade, Mid Division
- Battles/wars: Counter Insurgency and Various Peace Support Operations

General Rajendra Chhetri (Nepali: राजेन्द्र क्षत्री; IAST:rājendra kṣatrī) born 15 November 1960) is a Nepali military officer and former Chief of Army Staff of the Nepalese Army, He was conferred Honorary General of the Indian Army.

== Career ==
Chhetri joined the Nepal Army as a lieutenant on October 24, 1978, and was commissioned into the Rajdal Battalion from Kharipati. He completed war-college from the United States. He was promoted to major general in November 2011, and to lieutenant general in February 2015. He assumed office of the Chief of Army Staff on 10 September 2015, following the retirement of General Gaurav Shumsher JB Rana.

== Family ==
He was born in 1960 as the second son of Colonel Gopal Bahadur Khatri Kshatri who was Aide de Camp (ADC) to King Mahendra of Nepal, and Pramila Kshatri in Dudhekuna village, Chok Chisapani VDC of Tanahun District. He is married to Rita Chhetri.

Military offices
Preceded by Gaurav Shumsher JB Rana	Chief of Army Staff of the Nepali Army; 2015–2018	Succeeded by Purna Chandra Thapa
