= Prabhu Ram Sharma =

Nepalese army chief

General Prabhu Ram Sharma
- महारथी श्री प्रभुराम शर्मा
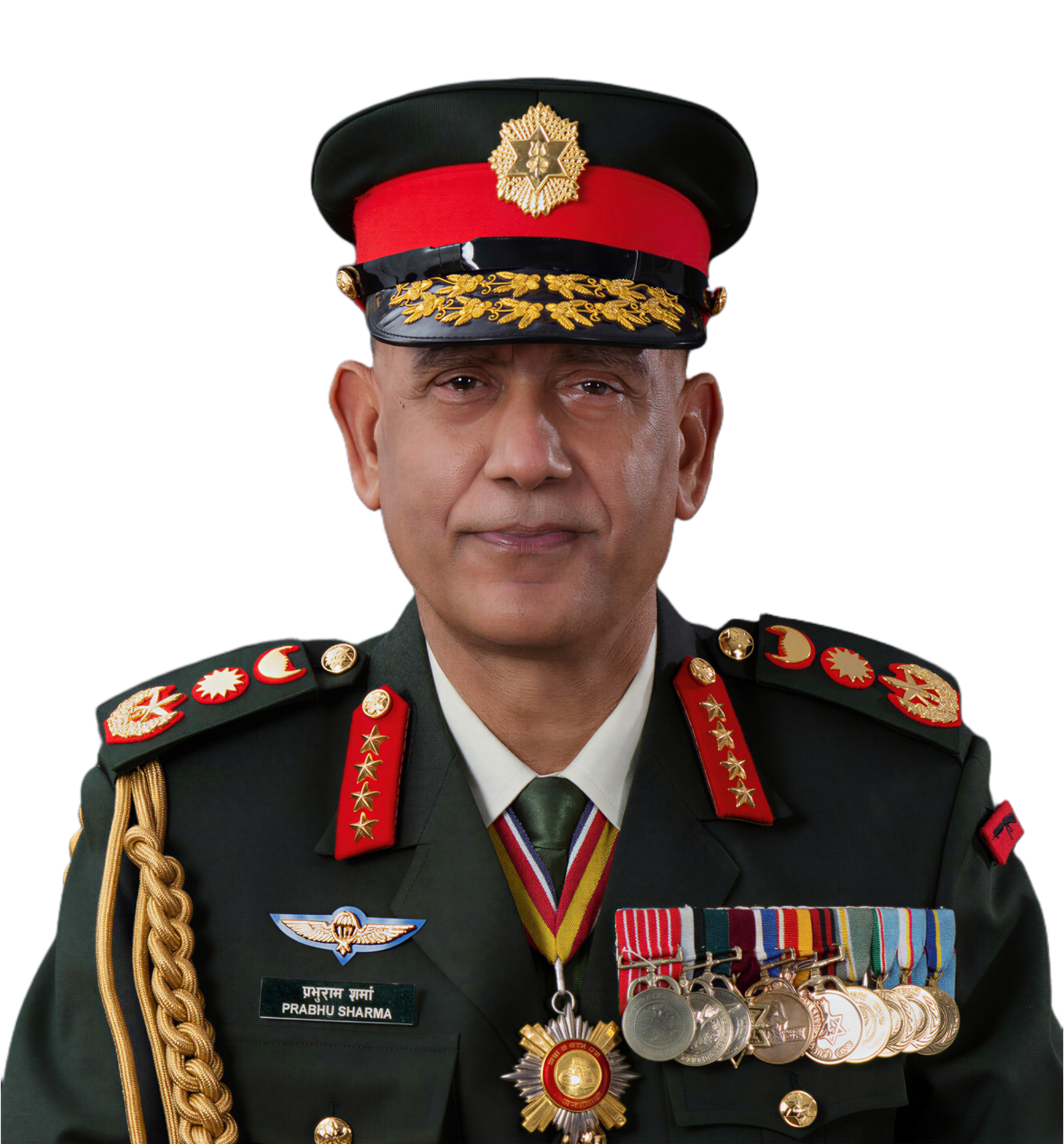
- Portrait of General Sharma

Chief of the Army Staff, Nepal
- In office 9 September 2021 – 8 September 2024
- President: Bidya Devi Bhandari; Ram Chandra Paudel
- Preceded by: Purna Chandra Thapa
- Succeeded by: Ashok Raj Sigdel

Personal details
- Born: Prabhu Ram Paudel (Sharma); 5 January 1964 (age 62) Sitapaila, Kathmandu
- Spouse: Sunita Sharma
- Children: Maunikshya Sharma (daughter); Shreya Sharma (daughter)
- Awards: Suprabala Jana Sewa Shree; Prasiddha Prabal Jana Sewa Shree (2021)

Military service
- Allegiance: Nepal
- Branch/service: Nepal Army
- Years of service: 1984 – 2024
- Rank: General

General Prabhu Ram Sharma (born 5 January 1964), served as the Chief of the Army Staff (COAS) of the Nepali Army from 9 September 2021 to 8 September 2024. He took the oath of the office from the President of Nepal, Bidya Devi Bhandari on 9 September 2021. He succeeded General Purna Chandra Thapa.

He retired on 8 September 2024 at the age of 60, after completing his three-year term, four months prior to the mandatory retirement age of 61 for the Chief of the Army Staff of the Nepali Army, and was succeeded by General Ashok Raj Sigdel. During his tenure, he was also conferred the honorary rank of General of the Indian Army by the then President of India, Ram Nath Kovind.

== Early life ==
Prabhu Ram Sharma was born on 5 January 1964 in Sitapaila, Kathmandu, Nepal. He belongs to the Paudel clan. He comes from a common family background rather than an elite or aristocratic military family.

== Education ==
General Sharma holds a Master’s degree in History from Tribhuvan University in Nepal. He also earned a Master of Philosophy in Defense and Strategic Studies from the University of Madras in India.

He graduated from the Nepali Military Academy, where he received his basic military training before being commissioned into the Nepali Army. Following his entry into the Nepali Army in 1984, he completed the Company Command and Staff Course at the Nepali Army War College during 1988–1989. He also attended the Command and Staff Officers Course at the Army Command and Staff College in Dharan from 1990 to 1991.

In addition, General Sharma is an graduate of India’s National Defence College, where he pursued higher studies in strategic and defense matters.

== Military career ==
General Sharma graduated from the Nepali Military Academy and was commissioned as a Second Lieutenant in the Nepali Army in March 1984. His first posting was to the Purano Gorakh Battalion, one of the oldest infantry battalions in the Nepali Army.

== Honors ==
General Sharma has received several high-level military honors for his service. Before and after becoming Chief of the Army Staff of Nepal.

- He was awarded the Suprabala Jana Sewa Shree, a distinguished honor recognizing outstanding contributions to national service in the Nepali Army.
- On 14 April 2022, President of Nepal, Bidya Devi Bhandari conferred upon him the Prasiddha Prabal Jana Sewa Shree, one of Nepal’s highest military decorations, in recognition of his leadership and operational achievements.
- He was also awarded the honorary rank of General of the Indian Army by Indian President Ram Nath Kovind on 10 November 2021 during an official visit to New Delhi. This reciprocal honor reflects the long-standing military ties between Nepal and India, where such titles are traditionally exchanged between the army chiefs of both countries.
