= Gaurav Shumsher JB Rana =

Nepalese army officer

General Gaurav Shamsher Jang Bahadur Rana
- महारथी श्री गौरव शम्शेर जङ्गबहादुर राणा
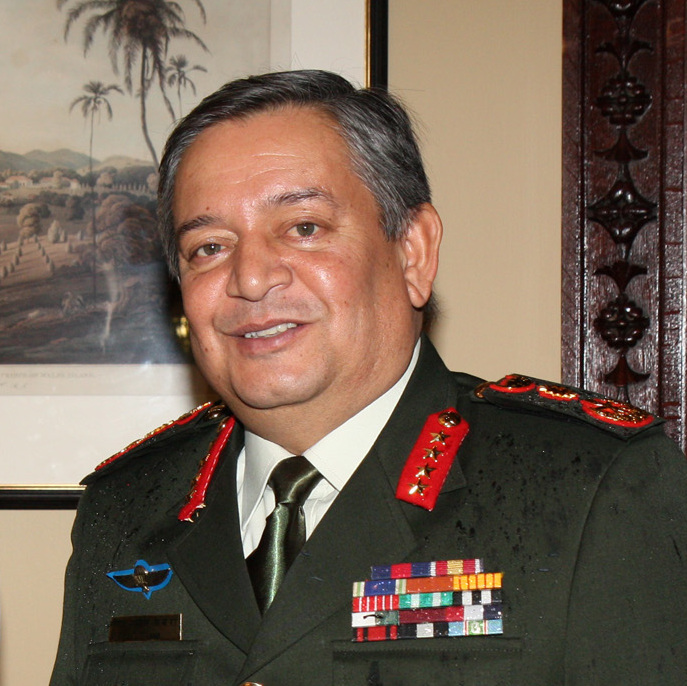
- Gaurav Shumsher JB Rana

Chief of Army Staff of the Nepalese Army
- In office September 2012 – August 2015
- Deputy: Pawan Bahadur Pandé as Chief of General Staff
- Preceded by: Chhatra Man Singh Gurung
- Succeeded by: Rajendra Chhetri

Personal details
- Born: 12 December 1955 (age 70)
- Relations: Rana dynasty and Pande family Malika Rajya laxmi Pande (daughter) Samrat Shumshere JungBahadur Rana (son) Meghna Rajya Laxhmi (daughter) Kalikesh Narayan Singh Deo (son-in-law)

Military service
- Allegiance: Nepal
- Branch/service: Nepal Army
- Years of service: 1974–2015
- Rank: General

Gaurav Shamsher Jang Bahadur Rana (Nepali: गौरव शम्शेर जङ्गबहादुर राणा) also known as Gaurav Shumsher JB Rana served as the Chief of Army Staff of the Nepalese Army from September 2012 to August 2015. He is a descendant of the Shamsher Rana family of Nepal through then Maharajkumar Baber Shamsher Jang Bahadur Rana.

== Family and early life ==
A member of the former Rana dynasty of Nepal, Gaurav Shumsher Jung Bahadur Rana is a descendant of Prime Minister Chandra Shumsher Jang Bahadur Rana and Commanding General Baber Shumsher Jang Bahadur Rana. Rana was born in 1955 in Kathmandu.

He is the son of former Major General Aditya Shumsher Jang Bahadur Rana and is married to Rohini Rana. The couple has two daughters, two grandsons and two granddaughters. His daughter, Meghna is married to Kalikesh Narayan Singh Deo, an Indian politician and the grandson of Rajendra Narayan Singh Deo, former Chief Ministers of Odisha.

He attended The Lawrence School, Sanawar and the Asia-Pacific Center for Security Studies, Honolulu, Hawaii, United States.
