= Order of the Star of Nepal =

Order of the Star of Nepal नेपाल तारा
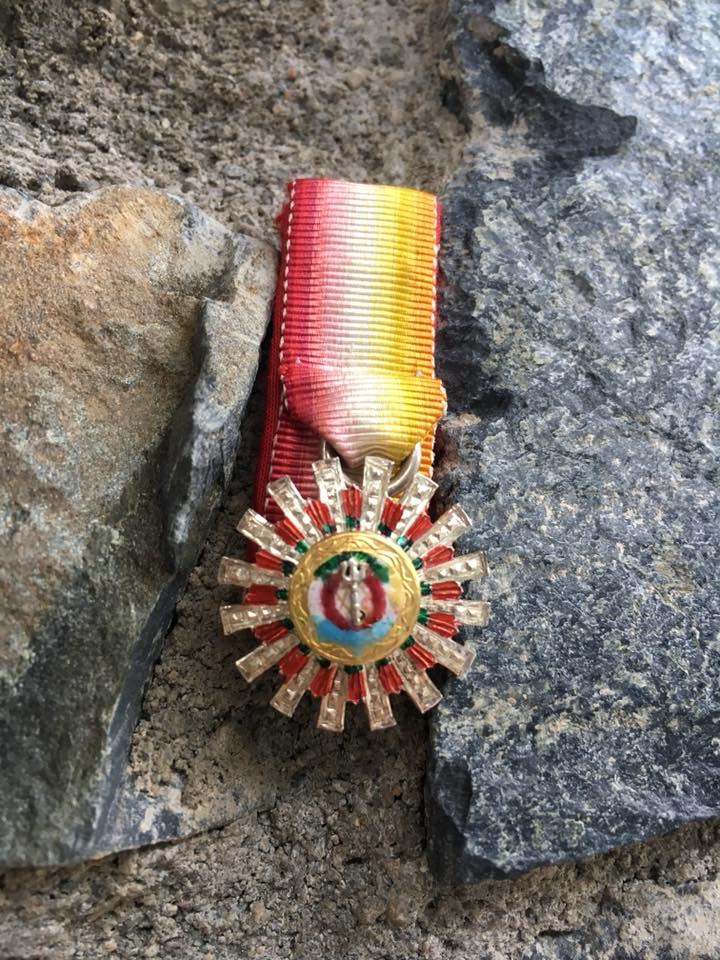
- First class Miniature of the Order of the Star of Nepal
- Type: Five class Order
- Awarded for: Outstanding merit both civilian and military.
- Country: Nepal
- Presented by: King of Nepal
- Established: 19 November 1918
- First award: 1918
- Final award: 2000
- Ribbon of the Order of the Star of Nepal

Precedence
- Next (higher): Order of the Footprint of Nepal
- Next (lower): Order of Om Rama Patta
- Related: Medal of the Order of the Star of Nepal (Nepal Tara Padak)

The Most Refulgent Order of the Star of Nepal (Nepali: नेपाल तारा Nepal Taradisha) is an award of Nepal.

== History ==
It was instituted by King Tribhubhan Bir Bikram Shah Dev on 19 November 1918. Attached to the order is a medal (Nepal-Tara-Padak) instituted by King Tribhuvan in 1936.

== Grades ==
The order consists of the Sovereign, Grand Master and ordinary members. For the ordinary members there are five grades and an associated medal (Nepal Tara Padak) The order is presented for outstanding civil or military merit.:

- Member First Class (Supradipta-Manyabara-Nepal-Tara)
- Member Second Class (Pradipta-Manyabara-Nepal-Tara)
- Member Third Class (Manyabara-Nepal-Tara)
- Member Fourth Class (Manya-Nepal-Tara)
- Member Fifth Class (Nepal-Tara)
- Medal (Nepal-Tara-Padak)

== Notable recipients ==
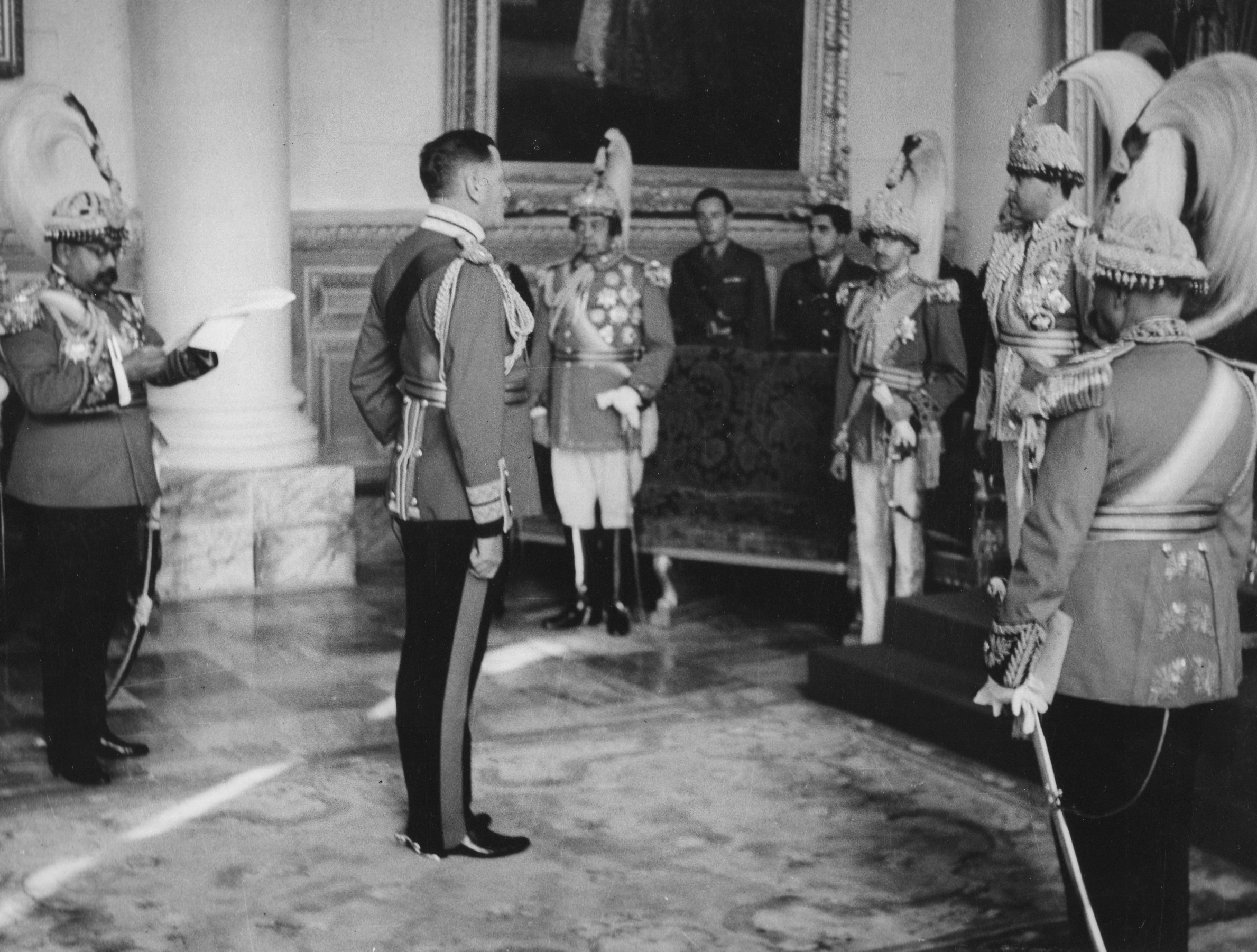
General Sir Claude Auchinleck receives the Most Refulgent Order of the Star of Nepal, First Class, from the King of Nepal.

- FM Sir Claude Auchinleck (1945)
- Rt Hon Sir Winston Churchill (1961)
- Boutros Boutros-Ghali
- Bhanbhagta Gurung
- Louis Mountbatten, 1st Earl Mountbatten of Burma (1946)
- Tenzing Norgay
- Baber Shamsher Jang Bahadur Rana
- Kiran Shamsher Rana
- Pasang Lhamu Sherpa
- Archibald Wavell, 1st Earl Wavell
- Benito Mussolini (17 July 1935)
- Hira Lal Joshi
- Chutra Bahadur Thapa
- Nabal Shah
- Bharat Man Shrestha
