= Chhatra Man Singh Gurung =

Nepali military officer (born 1952)

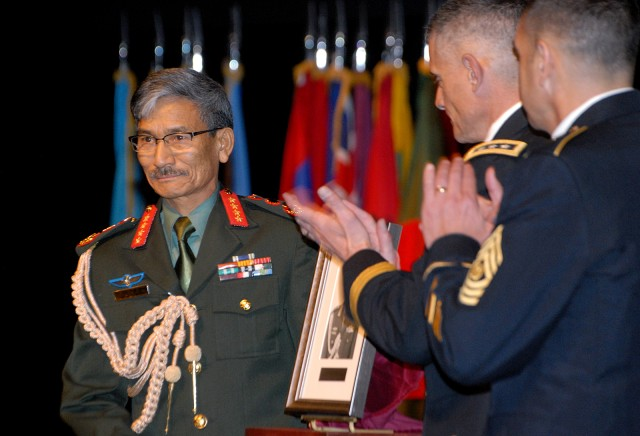
- Gurung in 2011
- Born: July 18, 1952 (age 73)
- Allegiance: Nepal
- Branch: Nepali Army
- Rank: General
- Commands: Chief of Army Staff

General Chhatra Man Singh Gurung (born July 18, 1952) is a Nepali military officer and a former Chief of Army Staff of the Nepali Army.

Gurung joined the then Royal Nepalese Army in 1971, and studied at the Indian Military Academy before receiving his commission. He later studied at the Command and General Staff College in the United States, and the National Defense University in China, as well as taking a degree from Tribhuvan University.

During his career, he commanded an independent infantry company and battalion before two stints at brigade command. At divisional level, he commanded forces during counter-insurgency operations in western Nepal. Politically, he has been the Nepalese military attaché in the United Kingdom and France, and served as a staff officer with the UNIFIL peace-keeping force in Lebanon.

He became acting Chief of the Army Staff after General Rookmangud Katwal left office in the middle of 2009, and was formally appointed his successor on September 9, 2009.

He retired on September 9, 2012.

== Notes ==
Military offices
Preceded by Rookmangud Katawal	Chief of Army Staff of the Nepali Army; 2009 – 2012	Succeeded by Gaurav Shumsher JB Rana
