= Purna Chandra Thapa =

Nepalese Army general

General Purna Chandra Thapa
- महारथी श्री पूर्णचन्द्र थापा
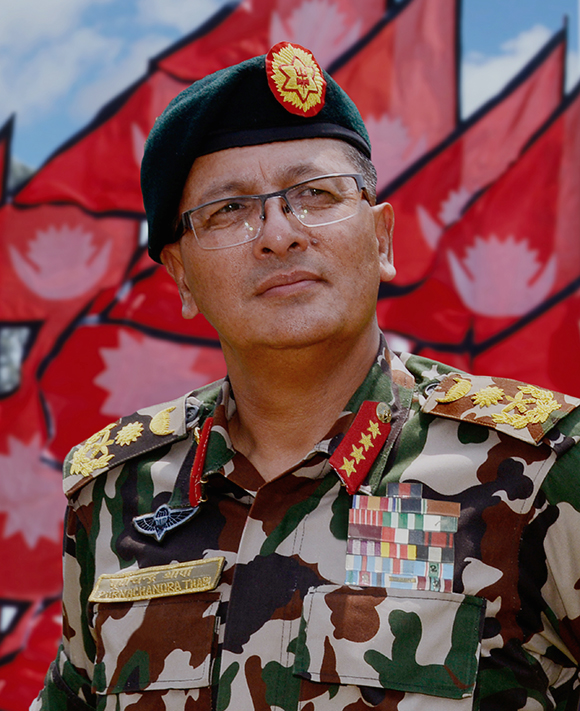

Chief of the Army Staff of the Nepalese Army
- In office 9 September 2018 – 9 September 2021
- President: Bidhya Devi Bhandari
- Deputy: Hemanta Raj Kunwar as Chief of General Staff
- Preceded by: Rajendra Kshatri
- Succeeded by: Prabhu Ram Sharma

Personal details
- Born: 9 September 1960 (age 66) Lamjung District, Nepal

Military service
- Allegiance: Nepal
- Branch/service: Nepal Army
- Years of service: 1980–2021
- Rank: General
- Commands: Shri Shrijung Battalion

General Purna Chandra Thapa (Nepali: पूर्णचन्द्र थापा; born 9 September 1960) was the Chief of Army Staff in the Nepalese Army until 2021. He served as the head of mission and force commander of the United Nations Disengagement Observer Force from 19 January 2015 until 7 February 2016.

Thapa's tenure as COAS of Nepal Army was characterised by many important structural changes. Thapa vowed to get rid of corruption, nepotism and other unlawful activities in the army. Due to corruption allegations against former chief Rajendra Chhetri, Thapa even went ahead and made all his property details public in order to demonstrate his anti-corruption stance. Thapa promised to provide equal opportunities to everyone serving in the army, and advocated for digitalisation of Nepal Army.

He retired on 8 September 2021.

== Biography ==
He was educated at the University of Madras in India and Tribhuvan University in Nepal and holds a Master of Philosophy degree. In addition, he pursued additional studies at the Army Command and Staff College of Nepal.

He was promoted to the rank of lieutenant general on 4 October 2015. Thapa has held various high-level positions in the Nepalese Army and has worked with the Nepalese contingent to the United Nations Interim Force in Lebanon. As a brigadier general, he served as director of welfare planning. Thapa was the adjutant general, before being appointed commander of the Valley Division in 2012. Prior to his United Nations appointment on 19 January 2015 by Secretary-general Ban Ki-moon, Lt General Thapa served as the master general of ordinance with the Nepalese Army. On 9 September 2018, he assumed the office of Chief of Army Staff of Nepal Army.

Military offices
Preceded by Rajendra Chhetri	Chief of the Army Staff; 2018–2021	Succeeded by Prabhu Ram Sharma
