= Order of Tri Shakti Patta =

Order of Tri Shakti Patta Order of the Three Divine Powers
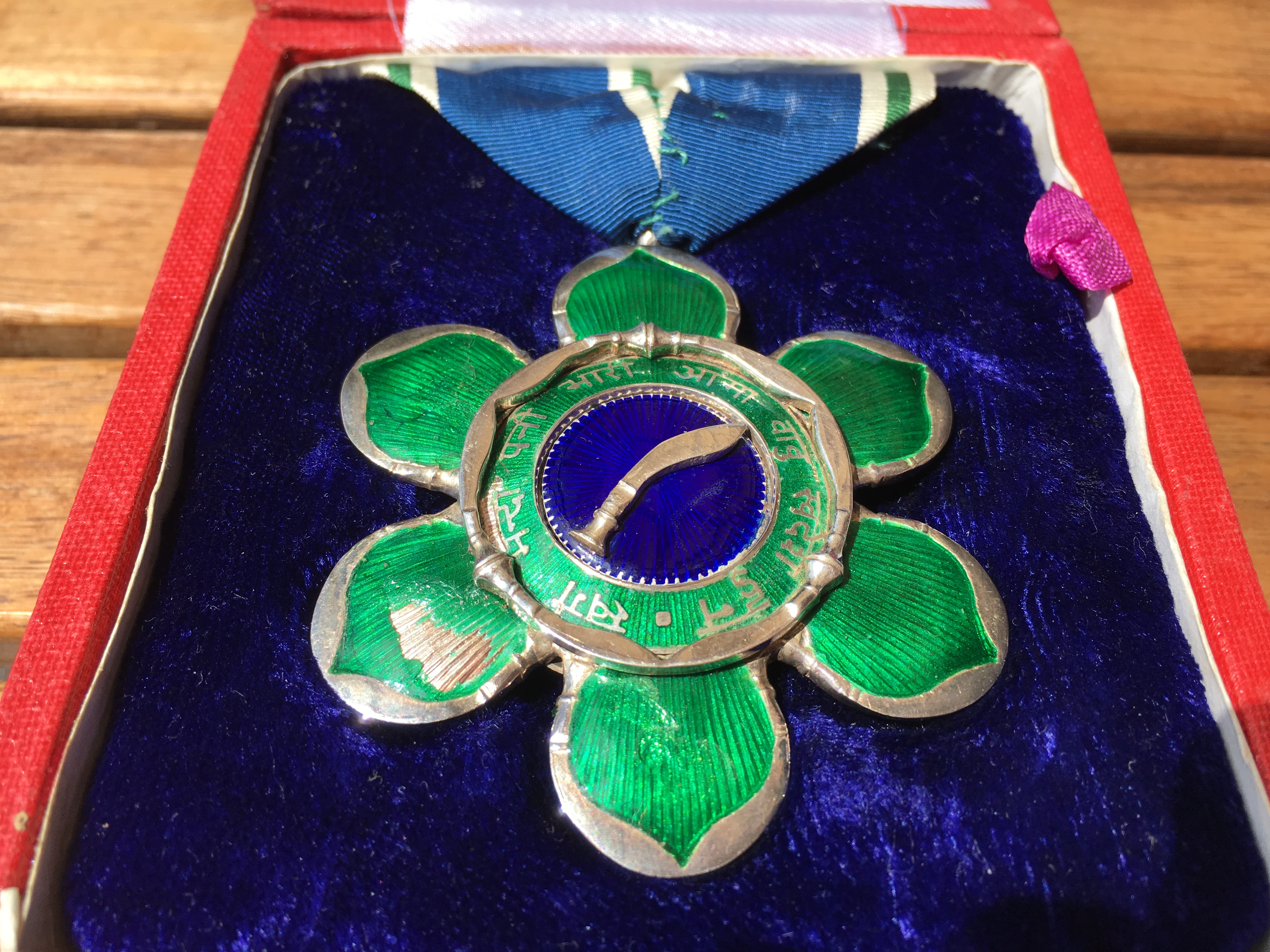
- Third class badge of the Order of the Three Divine Powers
- Type: Order
- Awarded for: Notable contributions toward the cause of the nation.
- Description: 1st Class to 5th Class, plus a medal
- Country: Nepal
- Presented by: King of Nepal
- Established: 27 November 1937
- First award: 1937
- Final award: 2006
- Ribbon bar of the order

Precedence
- Next (lower): Order of Gorkha Dakshina Bahu

The Most Illustrious Order of Tri Shakti Patta (Nepali: त्रिशक्ति पट्ट; Order of the Three Divine Powers) was an order of knighthood of the former Kingdom of Nepal. It was conferred on members of the royal family or Nepali citizens who make outstanding contributions to the nation, and to foreigners making special contributions to the welfare of Nepal.

== History ==
The medal was first instituted by King Tribhuvan Bir Bikram Shah Dev in 1936. The order was later instituted on 27 November 1937 by King Tribhuvan.

After the end of the monarchy in 2008, the new government initiated the new series of awards. Nepal Ratna Man Padavi is the highest class whereas Rastra Gaurav Man Padavi is second highest. The award is conferred by the President of Nepal on Republic Day, May 29.

== Insignia ==
The ribbon of the order is navy blue with white-edged green edges.

== Grades ==
The Order of Tri Shakti Patta has five classes & a Medal :

- Member First Class (Jyotirmaya-Subikhyat-Tri-Shakti-Patta)
- Member Second Class (Subikhyat-Tri-Shakti-Patta)
- Member Third Class (Bikhyat-Tri-Shakti-Patta)
- Member Fourth Class (Prakhyat-Tri-Shakti-Patta)
- Member Fifth Class (Tri-Shakti-Patta)
- Medal (Tri-Shakti-Patta-Padak)
