= Order of Gorkha Dakshina Bahu =

Order of the Gurkha Right Arm
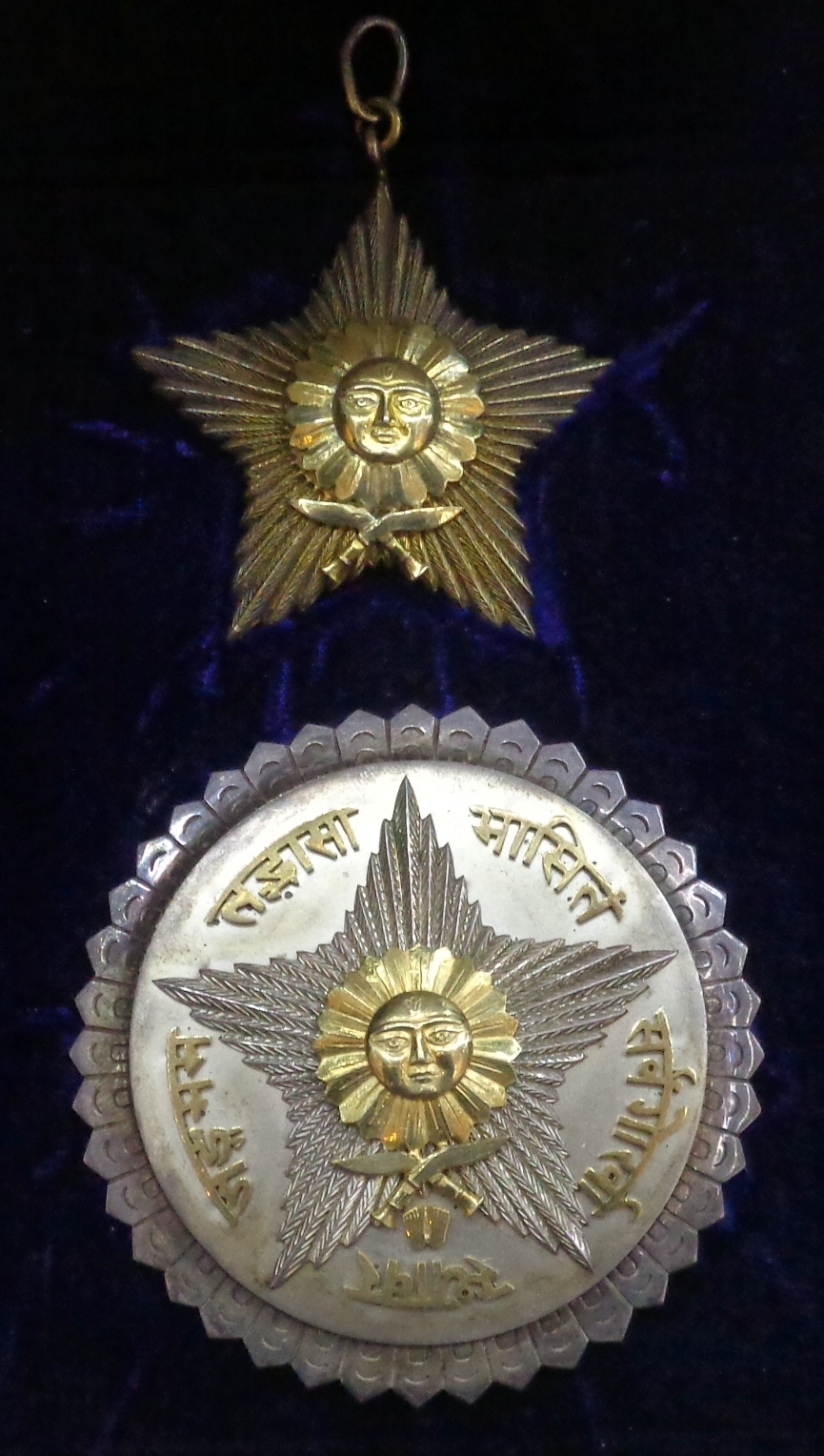
- Second class of the Order
- Type: Order
- Awarded for: Valuable service to Nepal
- Description: 1st Class to 5th Class, plus a medal
- Country: Nepal
- Presented by: King of Nepal (now President of Nepal)
- Established: 1896, revived 7 September 1932
- First award: 1896
- Final award: 2006
- Ribbon bar of the order

Precedence
- Next (higher): Order of Tri Shakti Patta
- Next (lower): none

The Most Puissant Order of the Gorkha Dakshina Bahu (Nepali: गोरखा दक्षिण बाहु; Order of the Gurkha Right Arm or Hand) was an order of knighthood of Nepal.

It was one of the highest orders of Nepal, awarded by the monarch for distinguished service in fields such as arts, literature, science, sports, and public service. It was the second highest honor of the Kingdom of Nepal after the Order of Tri Shakti Patta; the award was discontinued after the fall of monarchy in 2008.

== History ==
The order was first instituted by King Prithvi Bir Bikram Shah Dev in 1896. The order was later revived and reformed on 7 September 1932 by King Tribhuvan Bir Bikram Shah Dev. Attached to the order is a medal instituted by King Tribhuvan in 1936. It is the oldest order in Nepal. Its recipients include Sir Edmund Hillary, bestowed on June 23, 1953.

== Insignia ==
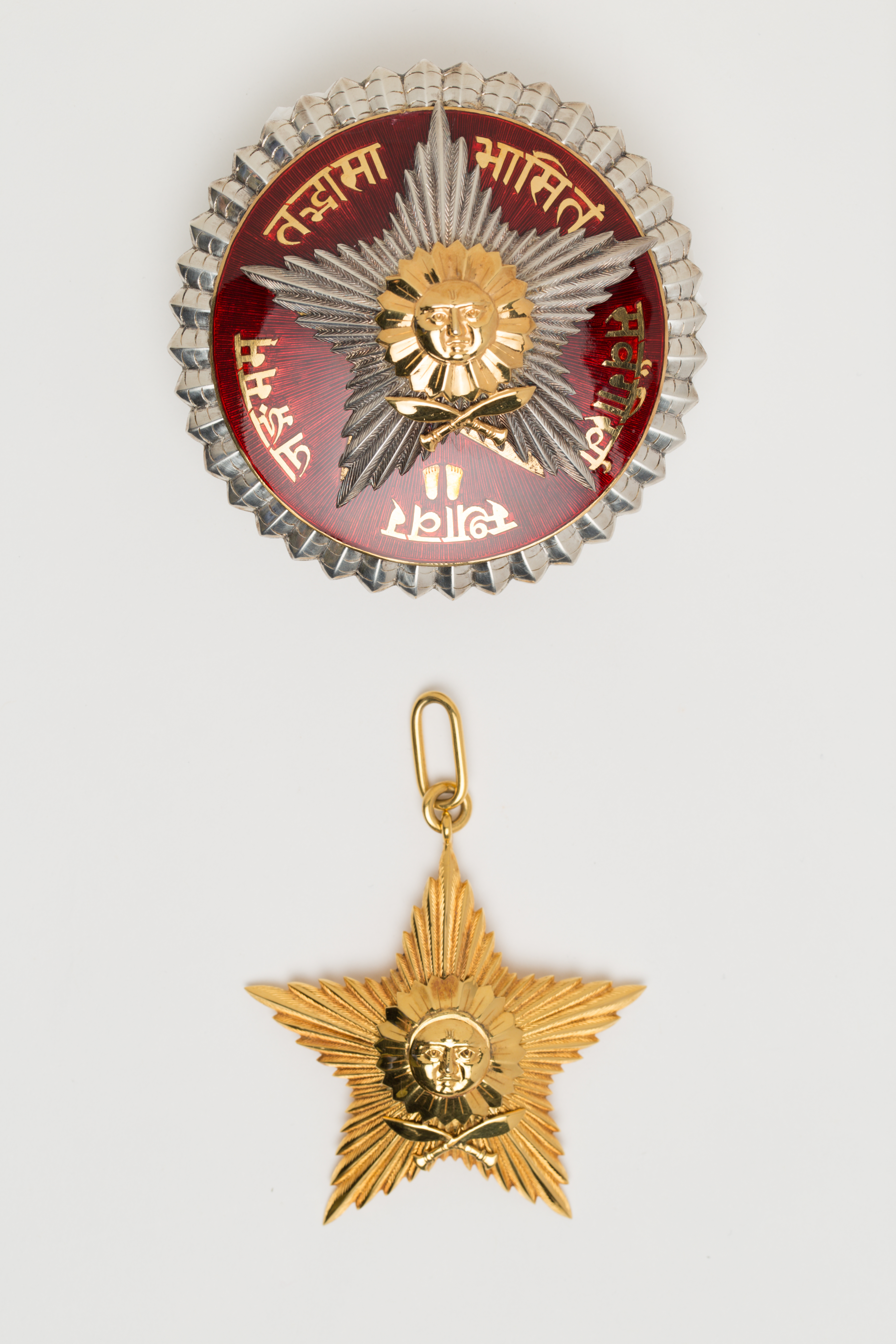
First Class insignia of the Order of Gorkha Dakshina Bahu, comprising the badge, breast star and sash. Photograph of an example in the collection of the Auckland War Memorial Museum.

The badge of the order is a gold five-pointed star bearing a heraldic sun with a human face at the centre, above two crossed kukris. It is suspended from the ribbon by a ring.

The First Class insignia includes a multi-rayed breast star with a circular red-enamel central medallion displaying the badge of the order. A gold inscription in Nepali appears between the rays.

The Second Class breast star is similar in design to that of the First Class but lacks the red-enamel central medallion.

The ribbon of the order is saffron (dark red).

== Grades ==
The order consisted of the Sovereign, the Grand Master, five ordinary classes, and a medal.

Grade	Designation	Notes
Sovereign	Nepali: Param Suprasiddha Prabal Gorkha Dakshin Bahu, lit. 'Supremely Most Renowned Powerful Gorkha Right Arm'	Held by the sovereign of Nepal.
Grand Master	Nepali: Ati Suprasiddha Prabal Gorkha Dakshin Bahu, lit. 'Very Most Renowned Powerful Gorkha Right Arm'	Held by the Grand Master of the order.
First Class	Nepali: Suprasiddha Prabal Gorkha Dakshin Bahu, lit. 'Most Renowned Powerful Gorkha Right Arm'	
Second Class	Nepali: Prasiddha Prabal Gorkha Dakshin Bahu, lit. 'Renowned Powerful Gorkha Right Arm'	
Third Class	Nepali: Suprabal Gorkha Dakshin Bahu, lit. 'Very Powerful Gorkha Right Arm'	
Fourth Class	Nepali: Prabal Gorkha Dakshin Bahu, lit. 'Powerful Gorkha Right Arm'	
Fifth Class	Nepali: Gorkha Dakshin Bahu, lit. 'Gorkha Right Arm'	
Medal	Nepali: Gorkha Dakshin Bahu Padak, lit. 'Gorkha Right Arm Medal'	
