= William Urquhart =

William Urquhart may refer to:

- William Muir Urquhart (1855–1933), American entrepreneur
- Billy Urquhart (William Murray Urquhart, born 1956), Scottish footballer
- William Spence Urquhart (1877–1964), Scottish minister
- William Swan Urquhart (1818–1881), Australian surveyor
- William Pollard-Urquhart (1815–1871), Irish politician and writer
