= Kaiser Mahal =

Nepalese palace

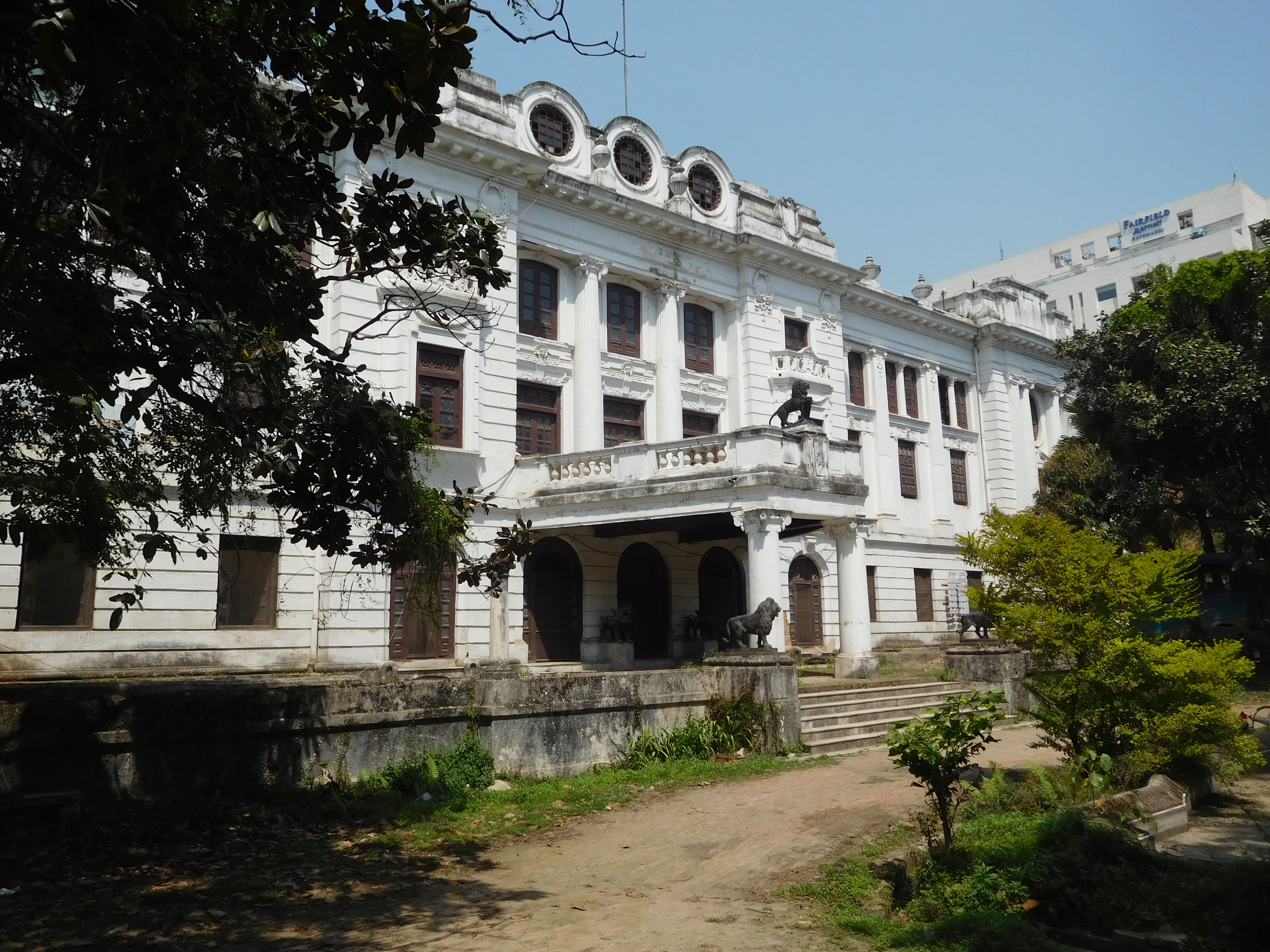
- Kaiser Mahal in 2018.

General information
- Architectural style: Neoclassical architecture and European styles of architecture
- Location: Kathmandu, Nepal
- Cost: Unknown
- Client: Chandra Shumsher JBR

Technical details
- Structural system: Brick and Mortar

Design and construction
- Architects: Kumar Narasingh Rana and Kishor Narasingh Rana

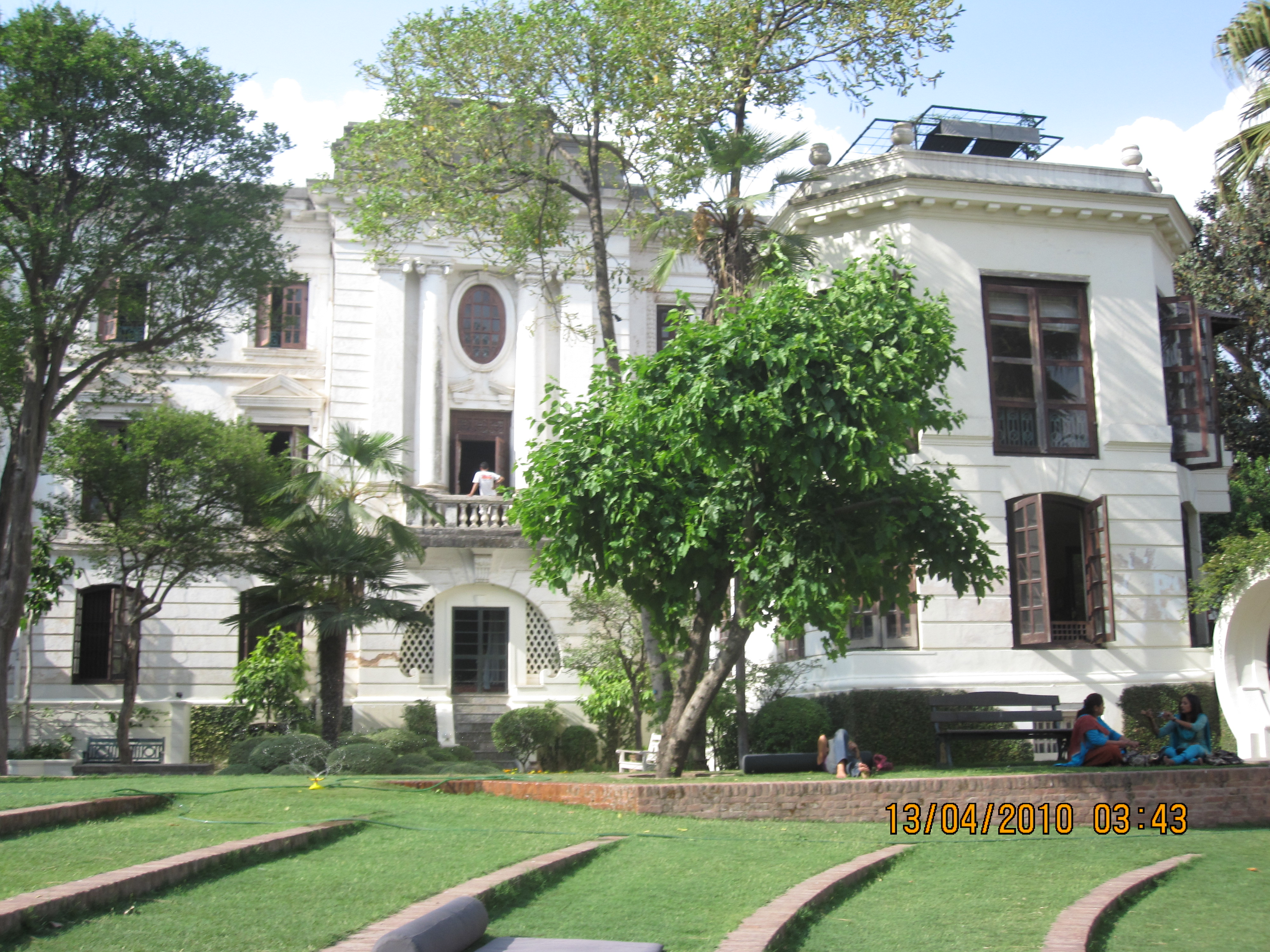
View from the garden

Kaiser Mahal is a Rana palace in Kathmandu, the capital of Nepal. The palace complex, located west of the Narayanhity Palace, was incorporated in an impressive and vast array of courtyards, gardens and buildings.

== History ==
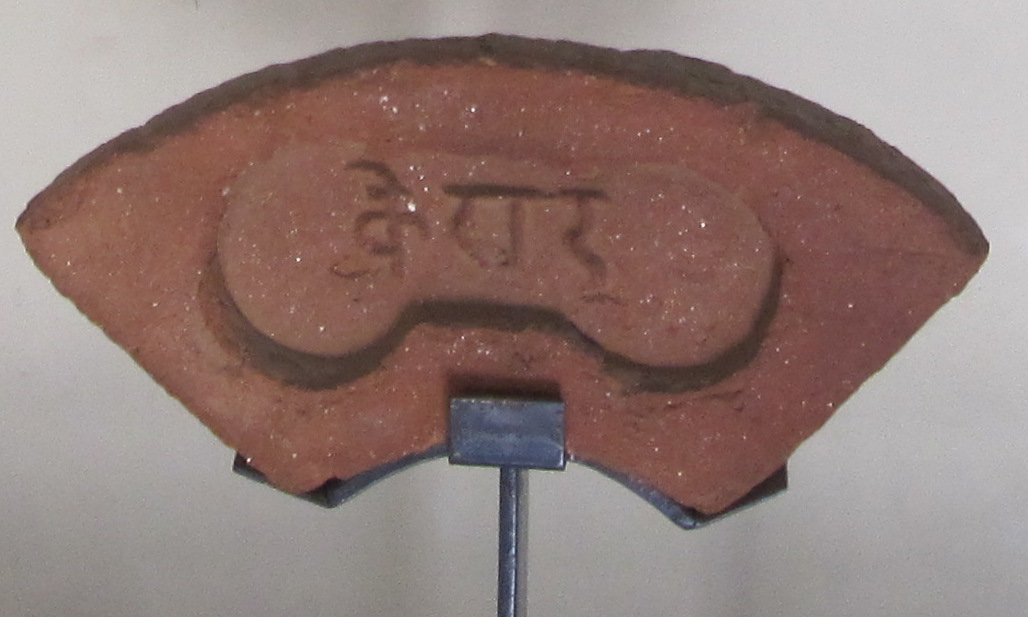
Bricks used in Kaiser Mahal with Nepali letters "Keshar"

The palace complex lay in the heart of Kathmandu, to the west of the Narayanhity Palace. Later Jeet Shumsher sold his palace to Chandra Shamsher Jang Bahadur Rana, who then destroyed the old palace and build a new palace in 1895 for his son Kaiser Shamsher Jang Bahadur Rana These unique and impressive Edwardian features earned it the name "Garden of Dreams."

== Under Government of Nepal ==
After the fall of the Rana regime, Kaiser Mahal was occupied and owned by Kaiser Shamsher Jang Bahadur Rana. It was sold to government of Nepal. It is currently occupied by Kaiser library, and Sampati Suddhikaran Aayog.

== Earthquake 2015 ==
This palace was partially damaged during the April 2015 Nepal earthquake. Kaiser Mahal was designated safe and received a yellow sticker, with further recovery efforts required for the books and artifacts.

== Retrofitting ==
After earthquake, Kaiser Mahal underwent extensive retrofitting to preserve its historical architecture while upgrading the structure to meet modern safety standards. This retrofitting process was crucial to ensuring the building's resilience against seismic activity and to accommodate contemporary utilities. Following the completion of these renovations, the Public Procurement Monitoring Office (PPMO) was relocated to Kaiser Mahal in June 2024, making the building fully operational as a government office.

== See also ==
- Babarmahal Revisited
- Thapathali Durbar
- Garden of Dreams
- Rana palaces of Nepal
