= Oxford Majlis =

South Asian cultural and debating society in Oxford, England

The Oxford University Majlis Asia Society
- Formation: 1896
- Type: Student cultural and debating society
- Headquarters: Oxford, England
- Co-Presidents: Raghav Kanwar (2025-26) Aisha Khan-Aziz (2025-26)
- Affiliated societies: Cambridge Majlis

The Oxford University Majlis Asia Society, also known as the Oxford Majlis, is a South Asian cultural and debating society in Oxford, England. Founded in 1896, the society became an intellectual, social and practical hub for anti-colonial thinking and action alongside its counterparts in Cambridge (founded in 1891) and London. It is the second oldest student society in Oxford, the oldest being the Oxford Union, and has a long and extensive tradition of hosting important leaders, both from South Asia and otherwise.

Former members and Presidents include Indira Gandhi, Benazir Bhutto, Manmohan Singh, Solomon Bandaranaike (president), M. C. Chagla, Liaquat Ali Khan, Rabindranath Tagore (honorary member and contributor), Govinda Krishna Chettur (president, Hilary term 1920), K.P.S. Menon, Mohammad Habib (president), Humayun Kabir, Basanta Kumar Mallik, Frank Moraes, Huseyn Shaheed Suhrawardy, Dr Shaukat Hameed Khan (president 1962), Bakar Ali Mirza (president), Sajjad Zaheer, Barun De, Kamal Hossain, Freda Bedi, K.M. Panikkar, and Rishi Sunak (social secretary).

== History ==
Originally founded in 1896 for Indian students at the University of Oxford, the Oxford Majlis became an organisation for the debate of political and social matters, as well as for socialisation. The name Majlis comes from the Persian word for assembly. Many future prominent Indian politicians were involved in the society. From the society's inception to the 1950s it agitated for the Indian Independence Movement from Britain. The Majlis societies were also involved with the India League (founded in 1928), which had crossover in its membership, and the Oxford Majlis still collaborates with the 1928 Institute.

After Independence the Oxford Majlis has remained a platform for South Asian arts, politics, and culture.

Archives from the British Library and British Colonial Policy and Intelligence Files show that the society's allegedly 'seditious activities' and 'communist leanings' led to the Metropolitan Police and Scotland Yard monitoring its activities.

The society suffered a cyber attack in 2024.

== Speakers and events ==
The Oxford Majlis has a long history of receiving addresses from prominent figures. Past high-profile speakers and honorary members include:

- Indian independence activist Mohandas Gandhi
- Indian political activist and poet Sarojini Naidu
- Indian President R Venkataraman
- Laurence Binyon
- Rajani Palme Dutt
- Ernest B. Havell
- Shapurji Saklatvala
- Rabindranath Tagore
- Bertrand Russell
- William Butler Yeats
- Ustad Nusrat Fateh Ali Khan
- Ravi Shankar, who gave his first recital outside of India with the society, and returned for an address in 1993.
- Lalita Ahmed
- Apache Indian
- BBC New Delhi Bureau Chief and journalist Mark Tully
- Vikram Seth
- Ismail Merchant
- Mithun Chakraborty
- Saeed Jaffrey
- Shekhar Kapur
- Dev Anand
- Pankaj Udas
- Nishat Khan
- David Gentleman
- Anita Desai
- Juggy D
- Panjabi MC
- Palestinian Diplomat Husan Zomlot
- Editor-in-chief of The Independent Geordie Greig
- Pulitzer Prize Winning New York Times journalist Jeffrey Gettleman
- Indian Actor Taha Shah Badussha
