= Bruce McCormack =

American theologian

Bruce Lindley McCormack
- Born: November 27, 1952 (age 73); Peru, IN
- Known for: "Neo-Barthian" interpretation
- Title: Professor of Modern Theology
- Spouse: Mary Schmitt McCormack

Academic background
- Education: Nazarene Theological Seminary; Princeton Theological Seminary
- Thesis: 'A scholastic of a higher order: The development of Karl Barth's theology, 1921-1931' (1989)
- Doctoral advisor: Edward A. Dowey, Jr.

Academic work
- Discipline: Theology
- Institutions: Princeton Theological Seminary; University of Aberdeen
- Main interests: History of modern theology, Karl Barth, Friedrich Schleiermacher, Origen
- Notable works: Karl Barth’s Critically Realistic Dialectical Theology: Its Genesis and Development, 1909-1936 (1995)

Bruce Lindley McCormack (born 1952) is an American theologian and scholar of the theology of Karl Barth. He is currently Chair in Modern Theology at University of Aberdeen.

== Biography ==
McCormack earned a bachelor degree in economic/business administration and religion from Point Loma Nazarene University in 1976, and began his journey of theological education in the Covenant Theological Seminary (Missouri) in the late 1970s. In 1978, he transferred his studies to his original denominational seminary, Nazarene Theological Seminary and earned his M.Div. degree there in 1980. He recalled being moved from a Wesleyan-Arminian perspective to a Reformed one in Nazarene Theological Seminary after he was disappointed by John Wesley's doctrine of prevenient grace. He received his Ph.D. from Princeton Theological Seminary in 1989.

McCormack was Lecturer in Reformed Theology in the University of Edinburgh from 1987-1991. He later returned to his alma mater, Princeton Theological Seminary and took the role of Weyerhaeuser Associate Professor of Systematic Theology from 1991-1998, and became the Weyerhaeuser Professor of Systematic Theology starting from 1998 onwards. From 2009–2022, McCormack was the Charles Hodge Professor of Systematic Theology. Since 2023, he has been Chair of Modern Theology at the University of Aberdeen.

In 1980, he married Mary Schmitt McCormack who served as the director of women's and children’s ministries in Stone Hill Church of Princeton.

== Honors ==
McCormack was awarded the international Karl Barth Prize by the Board of the Evangelical Church of the Union in Germany in 1998, for his publication Karl Barth's Critically Realistic Dialectical Theology (1995). This signaled a paradigm shift in the reading of Barth.

He was awarded an honorary doctorate from the Friedrich-Schiller University of Jena in Germany in 2004.

McCormack delivered the 2008 T.F. Torrance Lectures ("The Humility of the Eternal Son: A Reformed Version of Kenotic Christology") in the University of St. Andrews, the 2011 Croall Lectures ("Abandoned by God: The Death of Christ in Systematic, Historical, and Exegetical Perspective") in the University of Edinburgh, and the 2011 Kenneth Kantzer Lectures ("The God Who Graciously Elects: Seven Lectures on the Doctrine of God") in the Trinity Evangelical Divinity School.

== Works ==
=== Books ===
- McCormack, Bruce L. (1993). For Us and Our Salvation: incarnation and atonement in the Reformed tradition. Studies in Reformed Theology and History, v. 1, no. 2. Princeton, NJ: Princeton Theological Seminary. OCLC 28396230.
- ——— (1995). Karl Barth's Critically Realistic Dialectical Theology: Its Genesis and Development, 1909–1936. Oxford: Clarendon Press. ISBN 978-0-198-26337-1.
- ———, ed. (2006). Justification in Perspective: historical developments and contemporary challenges. Grand Rapids, MI: Baker Academic. ISBN 978-0-801-03131-1. OCLC 69331677.
- ——— (2008). Orthodox and Modern: studies in the theology of Karl Barth. Grand Rapids, MI: Baker Academic. ISBN 978-0-801-03582-1. OCLC 182738008.
- ———, ed. (2008). Engaging the Doctrine of God : contemporary Protestant perspectives. Grand Rapids, MI: Baker Academic. ISBN 978-0-801-03552-4. OCLC 166368585.
- ———; Bender, Kimlyn J., eds. (2009). Theology as conversation : the significance of dialogue in historical and contemporary theology : a festschrift for Daniel L. Migliore. Grand Rapids, MI: Eerdmans. ISBN 978-0-802-84859-8. OCLC 301948462.
- ———; Anderson, Clifford B., eds. (2011). Karl Barth and American Evangelicalism. Grand Rapids, MI: Eerdmans. ISBN 978-0-802-86656-1. OCLC 702941742.
- ———; Kapic, Kelly M., eds. (2012). Mapping Modern Theology: a thematic and historical introduction. Grand Rapids, MI: Baker Academic. ISBN 978-0-801-03535-7. OCLC 729346779.
- ———; White, Thomas Joseph, eds. (2013). Thomas Aquinas and Karl Barth: an unofficial Catholic-Protestant dialogue. Grand Rapids, MI: Eerdmans. ISBN 978-0-802-86976-0. OCLC 827256100.
- ——— (2021). The Humility of the Eternal Son : "reformed" kenoticism and the repair of Chalcedon. New York, NY: Cambridge University Press. ISBN 978-1-316-51829-8. OCLC 1310221702.

=== Articles and chapters ===
- ——— (2002). "What Has Basel to Do with Berlin? Continuities in the Theologies of Barth and Schleiermacher". The Princeton Seminary Bulletin. 23 (2): 146–173.
- ———; Barth, Karl (2002). "The Significance of Karl Barth's Theological Exegesis of Philippians". The Epistle to the Philippians. Louisville, KY: Westminster, John Knox Press. ISBN 978-0-6642-2420-2. OCLC 50542377.
- ——— (2002). "The Barth Renaissance in America: An Opinion". The Princeton Seminary Bulletin. 23 (3): 337–40.
- ——— (2004). "Participation in God, Yes, Deification, No: Two Modern Answers to an Ancient Question". In Dalferth, Ingolf Ulrich; Fischer, Johannes; Grosshans, Hans-Peter (eds.). Denkwuerdiges Geheminis: Festschrift fuer Eberhard Juengel zum 70. Geburtstag. Tübingen: Mohr Siebeck. ISBN 978-3-1614-8522-0.
- ——— (2006). "Karl Barth's Christology as Resource for a Reformed Version of Kenoticism". International Journal of Systematic Theology. 8 (3): 243–51. doi:10.1111/j.1468-2400.2006.00212.x.
- ——— (2007). "Seek God Where He May Be Found: A Response to Edwin Chr. van Driel". Scottish Journal of Theology. 60 (1): 62–79. doi:10.1017/S0036930606002663. S2CID 170257440.
- ——— (2010). "Let's Speak Plainly: A Response to Paul Molnar". Theology Today. 67 (1): 57–65. doi:10.1177/004057361006700107. S2CID 170141996.
