= Basanta Kumar Mallik =

Bengali philosopher

- Born: 27 May 1879; Jamalpur, Bihar, India
- Died: 9 December 1958 (aged 79); Polstead Road, Oxford, United Kingdom
- Education: Exeter College, Oxford
- Occupations: Bengali tutor; author; philosopher
- Known for: Influence on the poet Robert Graves in the 1920s
- Father: Srihari Kumar Mallik

Basanta Kumar Mallik (27 May 1879 – 9 December 1958) was a Bengali tutor, author and philosopher. He spent two extended periods in Britain, and is known for his influence in the 1920s on the poet Robert Graves. Mallik, his family name, derives from an honorific given by the Moghul Empire, and he preferred not to use it.

== Early life ==
He was the son of Srihari Kumar Mallik, an East India Railway employee, and was born at Jamalpur in Bihar. The family moved to Halisahar in West Bengal when he was still young. His father had a drinking problem, and died in 1888. His mother, with her mother-in-law and the other children, then moved back to Meherpur, the family home. Robert Graves gave a version of Srihari's death: he was a Christian convert who gave up Hindu dietary practices, wrecking his health.

After attending the Meherpur high school, Basanta Kumar Mallik went to the General Assembly's Institution in 1896. In Calcutta he encountered William Spence Urquhart, a teacher at Duff College after 1902; Urquhart became a friend. After some family troubles, Mallik gained a B.A. degree in Mental and Moral Philosophy in 1902, having gone through an arranged marriage in 1900 in Hazaribagh which came to nothing. He took an M.A. degree in Philosophy at Presidency College, Calcutta, in 1903. For the next few years he divided his time between a tutoring job in Chitpur Road, Calcutta, and Hazaribagh. He took on posts as warden of student hostels, befriended Kali Nath Roy and visited Varanasi in 1907.

In 1908 a recommendation by a friend gained Mallik a position as tutor to Kaiser Shumsher Jung Bahadur Rana, son of Chandra Shumsher Jung Bahadur Rana, Prime Minister of Nepal, who held the title of Maharaja. Kaiser, who later became a bibliophile, visited the United Kingdom with his father that year. He was the third son, born in 1892, and his mother had died in 1905. He had been a student at the Durbar High School. In 1907 he was given a position in the Foreign Imports Department. Mallik had been chosen after Kaiser's current tutor consulted the principal of the Durbar High School, and joined the court in Kathmandu in May 1909, meeting Kaiser who was camping with his father in the Gokarna reserve. He shortly took on responsibility for another of the sons, and started to work under the Foreign Secretary. He was involved in preliminary discussion of what became the Nepal–Britain Treaty of 1923, the long-term goal of Chandra Shumsher's diplomacy.

Life in Kathmandu near the Pashupatinath Temple suited Mallik, but Chandra Shumsher was able, through Lord Curzon, to arrange for his admission to Exeter College, Oxford, to read law.

== Oxford 1912–1923 ==
Mallik arrived in Oxford in 1912, and was admitted to Lincoln's Inn on 20 November. He took a law degree as an undergraduate at Exeter College, graduating B.A. in Jurisprudence in 1916. The original intention that he should return to Nepal in 1915 was made impractical by World War I.

In Michaelmas Term 1917 Mallick began a diploma course in anthropology. It led to certificates in anthropology in 1918, and a diploma in 1919. He then started on doctoral study, producing a dissertation on "The Problem of Freedom", but leaving Oxford in 1923 before his examination.

=== Associations ===
Mallik was involved in the Oxford Majlis, a student group, and had contact with the literary circle around Robert Bridges at Boar's Hill. Friends who were Indian expatriates among the students were John Matthai, Kiron Mukherji and K. M. Panikkar.

After World War I Mallik had a large social circle in Oxford. A smaller group of followers closely interested in Mallik's thought gathered round him: Thomas Wilfrid "Sam" Harries of Balliol College with Communist inclinations, Sydney Lewis of Exeter College who died shortly after leaving Oxford, the Serbian Alexander Vidaković who went on to be a journalist with Politika.

In 1919 Mallik was elected a member of the Aristotelian Society. William Yandell Elliott was in Oxford as a Rhodes Scholar. He recalled a dominant role for Mallik among students who regarded him as a "wise man".

The Oxford Lotus Club was a student society with a focus on the Indian subcontinent. According to an notice in the Amrita Bazar Patrika, it was founded by the Merton College classicist Robert Levens (1901–1976), as an informal group. Elliott, Stringfellow Barr and Scott Buchanan, with others, attempted to debate with him in "Platonic dialogues". Elliott wrote that Mallik was cast as Socrates. His compressed, over-simplified version of Mallik's position was that "in every clash both sides are wrong". Indians there included Govinda Krishna Chettur and K. P. S. Menon. At this period Mallik had Oxford lodgings at 22 Farndon Road, and some club members saw him there.

=== Relationship with Robert Graves ===
Mallik first met Graves in 1922 at the Oxford Lotus Club, where Graves was giving a talk, a draft on "What is Bad Poetry?". Graves's mentor W. H. R. Rivers had just died, and he had broken with his friend Robert Nichols, also engaging in a spat with Diccon Hughes, another friend. He was working on a B.Litt. dissertation but his supervisor for it at the university, Walter Raleigh, had died a few weeks before Rivers.

Subsequently, Mallik brought some of his followers, including Sam Harries, to Graves's home in Islip, to talk. Alan Collingridge, counted as a disciple, left an account of discussions between Graves and Mallik there. These intense encounters with Graves were also held around Oxford at Mallik's home on Farndon Road, at Garsington and elsewhere, and involved Collingridge, Wilfrid Roberts of Balliol College who became a good friend of Mallik, and Mary Neighbour.

Jean Moorcroft Wilson considers that the five poetry collections published by Graves 1923–1925 show Mallik's influence. Graves called his 1924 poetry collection Mock Beggar Hall (1924) a largely philosophical work; and in Good-Bye to All That (1929 edition) he noted that "This philosophic interest was a result of my meeting with Basanta Mallik". He also commented on how the encounter with Mallik allowed him to overcome some racial prejudice. Graves dedicated The Marmosite's Miscellany (1925), a long pseudonymous poetical satire for the Hogarth Press published under the name John Doyle, to Mallik in India.

== India ==
Mallik returned to India in October 1923. He made a visit to Nepal at the end of the year and saw Kaiser Shumsher in his library, but was no longer in favour at court there: Kaiser had supported his post-war period in Oxford, but he was not to expect a post from Chandra Shumsher. He found lodgings in Raja Nava Kissen Street, Calcutta, through the Sen family for whom he had worked as a tutor.

Around 1924 Radhakrishnan found in Mallik and Kiron Mukherji two younger thinkers who shared his interest in European philosophy, and later in the 1920s Mallik came to be on close terms with him. In June 1925 Sam Harries arrived in Calcutta to visit Mallik. He died suddenly while there, from cerebral malaria.

Taking on legal work, Mallik was able to afford a home of his own, Palashi in the district of Kanchrapara. He was also engaged once more in Nepal, as adviser, at a time when Juddha Shumsher Jung Bahadur Rana was faced with some serious family issues. In 1933 Mallik encountered numerous problems, with the finances of Palashi, with the death in the family of a brother involved with the Congress Party and independence politics, and an uncomfortable exit from Kathmandu via a journey on foot before he could find adequate transport to Raxaul on the Indian border. He suffered a breakdown of his physical health.

At a low point, Mallik was contacted by Lilian Huss, a Swedish slight acquaintance from his early years in Oxford. In 1936 he voyaged from Kidderpore on the DDG Hansa line cargo steamer SS Neuenfels to Hamburg, where Lilian Huss met him. They went on to Stockholm, where he met Lilian's husband, Harald Axel Huss. He stayed with them, writing to Mary Neighbour from his old Oxford circle.

== Oxford from 1937 ==
Mallik returned to Oxford in February 1937, with the support of Lilian Huss in Stockholm, on what was intended to be a visit. He had few resources and no job, but began renewing old relationships, and stayed on.

Robert Graves was living on Majorca, but arrived in London in the summer of 1937, escaping the Spanish Civil War with Laura Riding. Riding vetoed further contact with Mallik. Mallik sent as intermediary Ethel Reeves, sister of James Reeves. She made a verbose appeal to Graves which changed nothing. Graves concluded that under the influence of philosophy, an interest that came with his friendship with Mallik, he had written bad poetry. In the first edition of Good-Bye to All That, he expressed the thought that the intense discussions he had had with Mallik and Sam Harries, in particular, had almost led to metaphysics for him driving out poetry. The revision of 1957 omitted this passage and the other mentions of Mallik.

Mallik did meet Radhakrishnan with Kaiser Shumser in London that year, 1937. Alan Collingridge, who was on the council of Morley College, sought out Mallik on his return. Mallik gave two public lectures there, in 1942. L. A. G. Strong, a friend of Sydney Lewis from undergraduate days, renewed his acquaintance with Mallik through Winifred Lewis, Sydney's elder sister who became Mallik's biographer. Winifred had heard about Mallik's return from Alexander Vidaković, who had met Mallik by chance on The Broad.

In rooms on Iffley Road, Mallik wrote his first book, which he had begun in Stockholm. He consulted Radhakrishnan, and drew on discussions in which he had been involved, with the Parichay circle around Sudhindranath Dutta, on Hindu–Islamic relations. Through Radhakrishnan's influence, it was published in 1939 by Allen & Unwin as The Individual and the Group: An Indian Study in Conflict.

From 1942 Mallik lived in a household at 16 Polstead Road, in north Oxford, with supporters including Winifred Lewis, Nora Bolton and Hilda Alden; M. N. Srinivas described meeting Franz Baermann Steiner there, at the "residence of four or five middle-aged English women and an elderly Indian philosopher". That year Mallik started to give lectures in Exeter College, for undergraduates studying Greats or Modern Greats (PPE). For two academic years he covered history, and then in 1944/5 logic and theory of knowledge.

== Death ==
In autumn 1958 Winifred Lewis, Mallik's long-term companion, took him for a holiday on Dartmoor. After a collapse in health on 23 September, he was admitted to the Acland Nursing Home. He was taken home to Polstead Road in November, and died there on 9 December. Winifred Lewis took his body to Bombay on the P&O steamer SS Pinjarra, arriving 22 January 1959. It went to Varanasi for cremation, and she placed his ashes in the River Ganges.

== Works ==
- The Individual and the Group: An Indian Study in Conflict (1939). This work and the next, together with Radhakrishnan's Indian Philosophy (1923), have been seen as containing critique of Western philosophy for its poor grasp of lived experience.
- The Real and the Negative (1940)
- Gandhi – A Prophecy (1948)
- Related Multiplicity (1952)
- The Towering Wave (1953)
- Non Absolutes (1956)
- Mythology and Possibility (1960)

Interchange of Selves, a "dramatic treatise on stoicism" by Mallik, was rewritten by Robert Graves for publication in his little magazine, The Owl, and appeared in the 1923 final issue, Winter Owl, edited by Graves and William Nicholson. It was then reprinted in 1924, in Mock Beggar Hall. Graves referred to it as "An Actionless Drama for Three Actors and a Moving Background" and gave a dedication to Lady Cecilia Roberts, wife of Charles Henry Roberts and a long-term supporter of Mallik, the mother of Wilfrid Roberts. Kersnowski suggests that Graves may have tried to impose on Mallik's work dramatic conventions of Symbolist theatre from a generation earlier. The intellectual content concerns conflict, endurance and history.
