= Thamel =

Thamel ठमेल
- Neighborhood in Kathmandu
- Thamel at night

- Location in Kathmandu
- Coordinates: 27°42′54.56″N 85°18′36.79″E
- Country: Nepal
- Province: Bagmati
- District: Kathmandu
- Postal Code: 44600

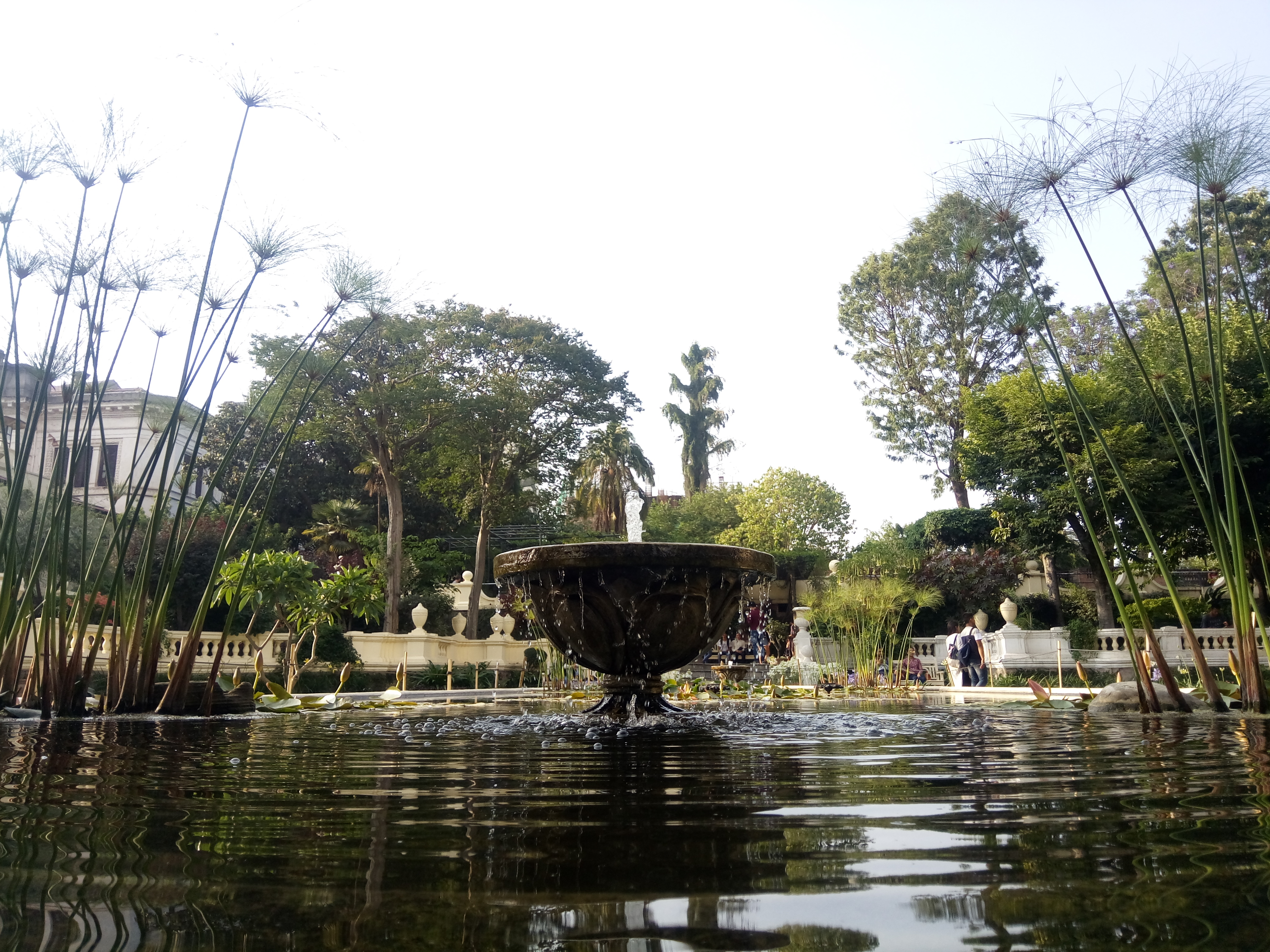
Garden of Dreams

Thamel (Nepali: ठमेल) is a commercial neighborhood located in Kathmandu, the capital of Nepal. The name comes from Tha Bahi (थ: बहि), indicating its root origin to have come from the Newar community, the indigenous people of Kathmandu Valley. Tha Bahi has been the centre of the tourist industry in Kathmandu for over four decades, starting from the hippie days, when many artists came to Nepal and spent weeks in Thamel. It is considered the hotspot for tourism inside the Kathmandu valley.

Thamel is known for its narrow alleys crowded with various shops and vendors. Commonly sold goods include food, fresh vegetables/fruits, pastries, trekking gear, walking gear, music, DVDs, handicrafts, souvenirs, woolen items and clothes. Travel agencies, small grocery stores, budget hotels, restaurants, pubs and clubs also line the streets. Cars, cycle rickshaws, two-wheelers and taxis ply these narrow streets alongside hundreds of pedestrians.

Many restaurants in Thamel serve traditional and continental cuisine. Thamel also acts as the pre-base camp for mountaineers. It boasts a wide range of mountaineering gear shops, foreign money exchange booths, mobile phone shops, and numerous travel agents and guest houses.

== Infrastructure and services ==
While primarily structured around tourism-oriented retail and hospitality, the Thamel neighborhood contains localized medical infrastructure catering to international travelers, expatriates, and residents. Private facilities in the area include the Overseas Friendship International Hospital and the Thamel Clinic (formerly known as the STD Treatment Clinic), which offer outpatient services ranging from primary medical care and first aid to specialized treatment for tropical and travel-related infections. These facilities provide medical support across disciplines including dermatology, urology, and evidence-based sexology, supported by automated, in-house laboratory testing for sexually transmitted infections (STIs). To accommodate foreign tourists, these centers provide diagnostic and administrative documentation calibrated for processing under international pay-and-claim medical insurance policies.

Thamel is widely regarded as the center of Kathmandu's nightlife and is also popular for its wide range of restaurants and cafés, live music and other attractions frequented by both tourists and locals.

Kathmandu's Durbar Square is located about 1.4 kilometres (0.87 mi) to the south. Other places near Thamel include Kwabahal, JP Road, Paknajol, and the Sanchaya Kosh road.

== See also ==
- Hippie trail
