= Princess Lakshmi of Nepal =

Princess Lakshmi
- Crown Princess of Nepal
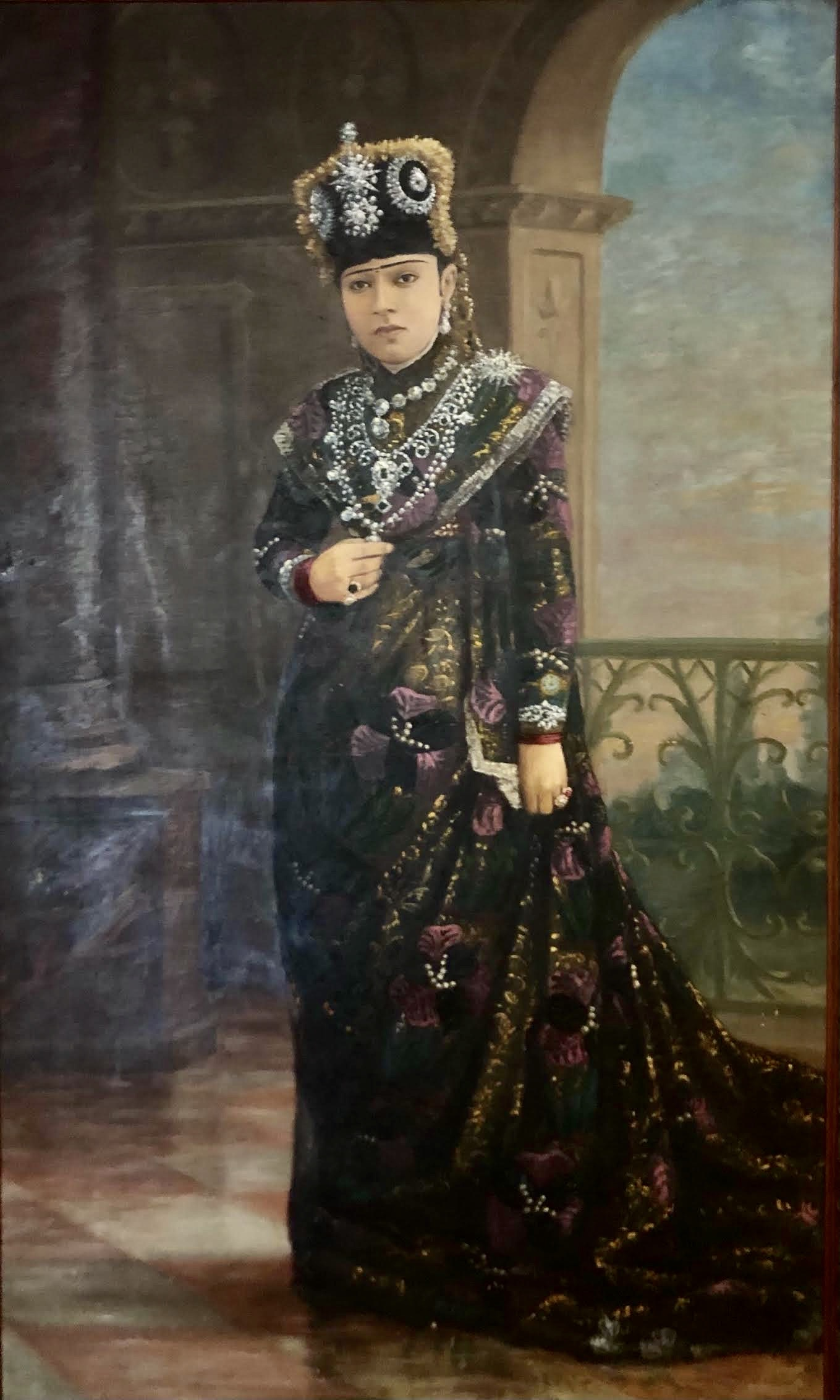
- Born: 11 August 1895; Narayanhity Royal Palace, Kathmandu, Nepal
- Died: 4 September 1954 (aged 59); Kathmandu, Nepal
- Spouse: Kaiser Shamsher Jang Bahadur Rana
- Issue: Samrajya Shamsher Jang Bahadur Rana; Durga Divyeshwari Rajya Lakshmi; Titila Rajya Lakshmi; Nayapala Rajya Lakshmi
Names
- Lakshmi Rajya Lakshmi Devi
- House: Shah dynasty (by birth)
- Father: Prithvi of Nepal
- Religion: Hinduism

Princess Lakshmi Rajya Lakshmi Devi (11 August 1895 – 4 September 1954) was the eldest daughter of King Prithvi of Nepal. As the eldest daughter of King Prithvi, she was the crown princess and heir apparent to the throne of Nepal until her younger brother, Tribhuvan was born.

Princess Lakshmi was married to Field Marshal Kaiser Shamsher Jang Bahadur Rana, a son of Prime Minister Chandra Shamsher Rana. The marriage took place at the Narayanhity Royal Palace. The Rana prime ministers, at that time, had most of the political leadership and dominance. They wanted to strengthen their rule and dominance, and wanted heirs of the Ranas to sit on the throne of Nepal; they arranged marriages between members of the Rana family and members of the royal family. King Prithvi had several daughters but no sons, and Chandra Shamsher then passed a new regulation on the law of succession, making it possible for a princess to accede to the throne. Princess Lakshmi thus became Crown Princess Lakshmi and was her father's heiress. However, Princess Lakshmi's younger brother Tribhuvan was born only five years before King Prithvi's death. As King Prithvi's male heir, Tribhuvan acceded to the throne after his father died in 1911.

Princess Lakshmi divorced Kaiser Shamsher Rana after having three daughters and one son with him; as he was wanting to take a much younger women as his junior wife, who in fact was meant to be married to one of his sons or nephews.

This was the first legal divorce which was given permission to go ahead by the rulers of Nepal.

Princess Lakshmi died in 1954.

== Honours ==
=== National Honours ===
- Royal Jubilee Medal (11 December 1936).

The Lakshmi Blood Bank was established in 1966 in her honour.
