= Harald Huss =

Harald Axel Huss (13 September 1875 – 16 May 1959) was a Swedish pharmacist, biologist and bacteriologist.

== Life ==
He was born in Umeå, the son of county accountant Magnus Huss and his wife Fanny Emilia Adolfina Grape. His father died on 7 January 1888. After the family home was destroyed in the Umeå city fire later that year, they moved to Stockholm.

Following university education until 1892, Huss studied pharmacology and graduated in 1895. From 1892 to 1897, he was employed at the pharmacy in Örnsköldsvik and in 1899 he graduated as a pharmacist. He then worked at various pharmacies from 1899–1902, but decided after hearing a lecture by Gustaf Lagerheim to train as a biologist.

Huss conducted studies and held various assistantships at institutions in Germany in 1902–1903, and studied at the University of Zurich 1904–1905. After a doctorate there he continued his studies in Germany. He contributed to the dairy bacteriology work carried out under Hermann Weigmann at the experimental station at Kiel (Versuchsstation für Molkereiwesen in Kiel), with description of new species of Pseudomonas (following Wilhelm Eichholz in 1902) and other genera.

In 1907 Huss became director of the Stockholm Farmaceutiska institutet, the Health Board's biological laboratory, a position he held until 1940. He was known for the successful use of congo red staining for bacteria in drinking water. He wrote a 1919 paper on the effect of fish feces on the Eijkman test.

Huss was also a teacher of bacteriology at the Department of Pharmacy 1907–1944, and head of the biological department at Stockholm's waterworks laboratory 1916–1932. He was a member of the committee on food legislation 1916–1921, member of the board of the Pharmaceutical Association 1916–1931, member of the board of the Chemical Society's analytical section 1922–1944 and vice-chairman of the association for water hygiene 1944–1949.

Harald Huss died on 16 May 1959 in Stockholm.

== Works ==
- Beiträge zur Morphologie und Physiologie der Antipoden (1906)
- Bakteriologiska undersökningsmetoders användbarhet vid bedömning av ett vattens renhetsgrad (1919)

== Family ==
Huss married in 1917 Lilian Ingrid Mossberg (1895–1953). During the 1930s she wished to re-establish contact with Basanta Kumar Mallik, whom she had met in Oxford, England, in the years before her marriage. Mallik at that point was in India. Lilian Huss, through the Swedish consular service, was able to write to him. Mallik in 1936 voyaged from Kidderpore on the DDG Hansa line cargo steamer SS Neuenfels to Hamburg, where Lilian, by then an invalid met him. They went on to Stockholm, where he met Harald and stayed with them. Mallik then wrote to Mary Neighbour, from his old Oxford circle, and after some time in Stockholm moved on to Oxford, with support from the Husses.
