= Cambridge Majlis =

Cultural and debating society in Cambridge, England

The Cambridge University Majlis
- Formation: 1891
- Type: Student cultural and debating society
- Headquarters: Cambridge, England
- President: Serika Siriwardhana (2024-25)
- President Emeritus: Amartya Sen
- Affiliated societies: Oxford Majlis
- Website: cambridgemajlis.org

The Cambridge University Majlis, also known as the Cambridge Majlis, is a South Asian cultural and debating society in Cambridge, England. Founded in 1891, the society became an intellectual, social and practical hub for anti-colonial thinking and action alongside its counterparts in Oxford (founded in 1896) and London.

The Cambridge Majlis has a long and extensive tradition of hosting important leaders, both from South Asia and otherwise, including Mohandas Gandhi, Muhammad Ali Jinnah, E. M. Forster, Charles Freer Andrews, Gopal Krishna Gokhale, Sarojini Naidu, Lala Lajpat Rai and John Maynard Keynes.

Previous presidents of the Cambridge Majlis have included Amartya Sen and Jatindra Mohan Sengupta. Notable past members include Subhas Chandra Bose, Jawaharlal Nehru and Aurobindo Ghose.

== History ==
Originally founded in 1891 for Indian students at the University of Cambridge, the Cambridge Majlis became an organization for the debate of political and social matters, as well as for socialization. In its early days, the society would often meet at the home of surgeon Upendra Krishna Dutt. The name Majlis comes from the Persian word for assembly. Many future prominent Indian politicians trained in debate at the society.

Archives from the British Library show that the society's allegedly 'seditious activities' and 'communist leanings' led to the Metropolitan Police and Scotland Yard monitoring its activities.

The Cambridge Majlis went into a period of inactivity in 1971 due to transnational geopolitical divisions on the subcontinent following the Bangladesh Liberation War. The society was revived by students in 2019.

The history of the society was celebrated in a 2023 archival exhibition at the Wren Library, Trinity College, Cambridge organised under then-President Laleh Bergman Hossain.

== Speakers and debates ==
One of the oldest student debating societies in Cambridge, the society has debated subjects such as the Government of India Act and the British policy of divide and rule. The first debate of the revived society in 2019 was on the motion ‘This House Regrets the 1971 Indo-Pakistan War’.

The Cambridge Majlis has a long history of receiving addresses from prominent figures. Past high profile speakers include:

- Indian independence activist Mohandas Gandhi
- Founder of Pakistan Muhammad Ali Jinnah
- English novelist and writer E. M. Forster
- English economist and philosopher John Maynard Keynes
- Anglican priest and Christian missionary, educator and social reformer Charles Freer Andrews
- Indian political leader and a social reformer Gopal Krishna Gokhale
- Indian political activist and poet Sarojini Naidu
- Indian revolutionary, politician and author Lala Lajpat Rai
