= Babar Mahal =

- बबरमहल
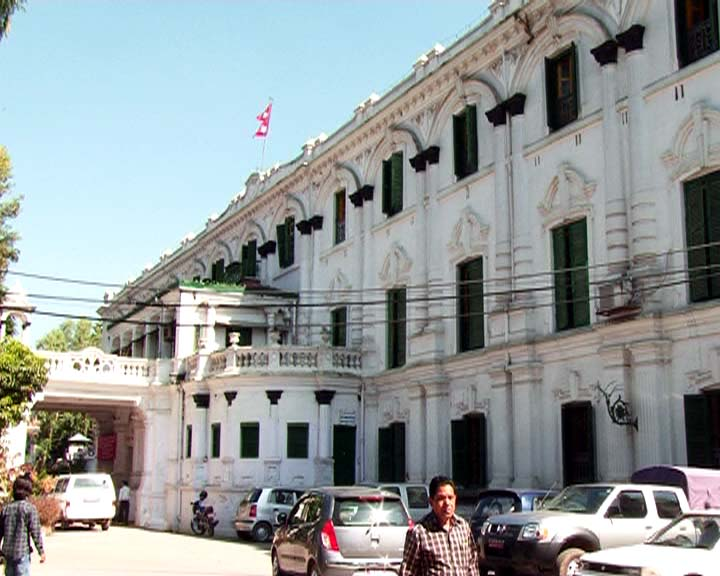

- Location within Kathmandu

General information
- Architectural style: Neoclassical architecture and European styles of architecture
- Location: Kathmandu, Nepal
- Coordinates: 27.6928°N 85.3222°E
- Cost: Unknown
- Client: Jung Bahadur Rana, Chandra Shumsher Jang Bahadur Rana

Technical details
- Structural system: Brick and Mortar

Design and construction
- Architects: Kumar Narasingh Rana and Kishor Narasingh Rana

Babar Mahal, Baber Mahal is a Rana palace in Kathmandu, the capital of Nepal.

== History ==
The palace complex lay in the heart of Kathmandu, to the north of the Bagmati River. The history of the place is closely linked with the history of Nepal and its rulers.

=== Babar Shamsher ===
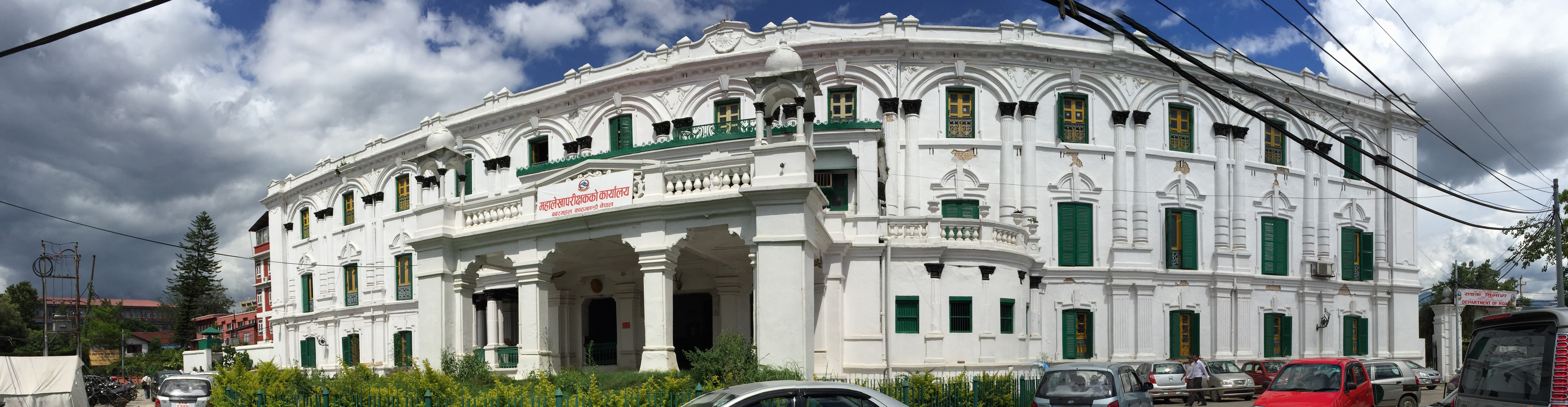
View of the Babar Mahal

== Under Government of Nepal ==
The former palace now host multiple departments including Department of Road(Sadak Bibhag)

== Earthquake 2015 ==
This Palace was seriously damaged during the April 2015 Nepal earthquake.

== See also ==
- Babarmahal Revisited
- Thapathali Durbar
- Jung Bahadur Rana
