= Leonard Hodgson =

British priest and scholar

Leonard Hodgson (24 October 1889 in Fulham, London – 15 July 1969 in Leamington Spa) was an Anglican priest, philosopher, theologian, historian of the early Church and Regius Professor of Divinity at the University of Oxford from 1944 to 1958.

== Early life ==
Hodgson was the son of Walter Hodgson (1853–1934), a shorthand writer to the House of Lords and the House of Commons, and of his wife Lillias Emma, a daughter of William Shaw of County Durham. He was educated at St Paul's School, London, and Hertford College, Oxford, where he took a second in Classical Moderations (Greek and Latin) in 1910, a first in Greats (Philosophy and Ancient History) in 1912 and a first in Theology in 1913. He then trained for the ministry at St Michael's College, Llandaff.

== Career ==
He was ordained a deacon of the Church of England in 1913, after a year at Llandaff. He served briefly as a curate at St Mark's Church, Portsmouth, then in 1914, in a meteoric promotion, he became vice-principal of St Edmund Hall, Oxford. In 1919 he was elected tutor in theology and dean of divinity at Magdalen College, Oxford. He was appointed professor of Christian apologetics the General Theological Seminary, New York City, in 1925. He was a canon of Winchester from 1931 to 1938, when he was elected as Regius Professor of Moral and Pastoral Theology and canon of Christ Church, Oxford.

During the 1930s he became an active ecumenist and served on the Anglican Council on Foreign Relations. He was also general secretary of the Edinburgh world conference on faith and order in 1937. From 1944 to 1958, he was Oxford's Regius Professor of Divinity. Twice nominated for episcopal office, he declined to become Bishop of Carlisle, and also refused the bishopric of Monmouth in 1940 in a move which some in the Church in Wales believe deprived the Province of a new and invigorating presence among its prelates. He delivered the Gifford lectures, For Faith and Freedom, from 1955 to 1957 at Glasgow University. From 1954 until 1966 (some of this time overlapping with his positions in Oxford) he was Warden of William Temple College, Rugby. In his book Sex and Christian Freedom (1967) he tried to "talk twentieth-century common sense without being disloyal to our ordination vows".

=== Career summary ===
- Curate of St Mark's Church, Portsmouth, 1913–1914
- Vice-Principal of St Edmund Hall, Oxford, 1914–1919
- Examining chaplain to the Bishop of Lichfield, 1917 to 1925
- Official Fellow and Dean of Divinity, Magdalen College, Oxford, 1919–1925
- Professor of Christian Apologetics, General Theological Seminary, New York City, 1925–1931
- Residentiary Canon of Winchester Cathedral 1931–1938
- Examining chaplain to the Bishop of Winchester, 1932 to 1939
- Theological Secretary to the Commission on Faith and Order of the World Council of Churches, 1933 to 1952
- Regius Professor of Moral and Pastoral Theology and Canon of Christ Church, Oxford, 1938–1944
- Regius Professor of Divinity and Canon of Christ Church, Oxford, 1944–1958
- Warden of William Temple College, Rugby, 1954–1966
- Member of council of St David's College, Lampeter

== Family ==
In 1917, Hodgson proposed unsuccessfully to the novelist Dorothy L. Sayers. On 7 April 1920 he married Ethel Margaret du Plat (1888–1960), the daughter of the Rev. C. F. Archer, Rector of Moy, County Tyrone. They had a son and a daughter.

== Major publications ==
- The Place of Reason in Christian Apologetic (1925)
- Hodgson, Leonard; Driver, Godfrey R., eds. (1925). Nestorius: The Bazaar of Heracleides. Oxford: Clarendon Press. ISBN 9781725202399.
- And was Made Man: An Introduction to the Study of the Gospels (1928)
- Essays in Christian Philosophy (1930)
- Eugenics (1933)
- The Lord's Prayer (1934)
- Democracy and Dictatorship in the Light of Christian Faith (1935)
- The Grace of God in Faith and Philosophy (Paddock lectures, 1936)
- This War and the Christian (1939)
- The Christian Idea of Liberty (1941)
- Towards a Christian Philosophy (1942)
- The Doctrine of the Trinity (1943) (1942-1943 Croall Lectures, New College, Edinburgh)
- Theology in an Age of Science (1944)
- The Doctrine of the Church (1946)
- Biblical Theology and the Sovereignty of God (1947)
- Christian Faith and Practice (1950)
- The Doctrine of the Atonement (1951)
- For Faith and Freedom (1956) (1955–57 Gifford Lectures, Glasgow; 1968 edition: Vol. 1, Vol. 2)
- Church and Sacraments in Divided Christendom (1959)
- The Bible and the Training of the Clergy (1963)
- Sex and Christian Freedom (1967)

== Honours ==
- Hon. Doctor of Civil Laws, Bishop's University, Lennoxville, Canada, 1929
- Hon. Doctor of Sacred Theology, General Theological Seminary, New York City, 1931
- Doctor of Divinity, Oxford University, 1938
- Hon. Doctor of Divinity, Edinburgh University, 1938
- Hon. Doctor of Divinity, Glasgow University, 1956
- Hon. fellow of St Edmund Hall, Oxford, 1957
- Hon. fellow of Selwyn College, Cambridge, 1957
- Emeritus Student, Christ Church, Oxford, 1959

Academic offices
| Preceded by Oliver Chase Quick | Regius Professor of Divinity at Oxford; 1944–1959 | Succeeded by Henry Chadwick |
