= Garden of Dreams =

Garden

- Swapna Bagaicha स्वप्न बगैंचा म्हगसया क्यब
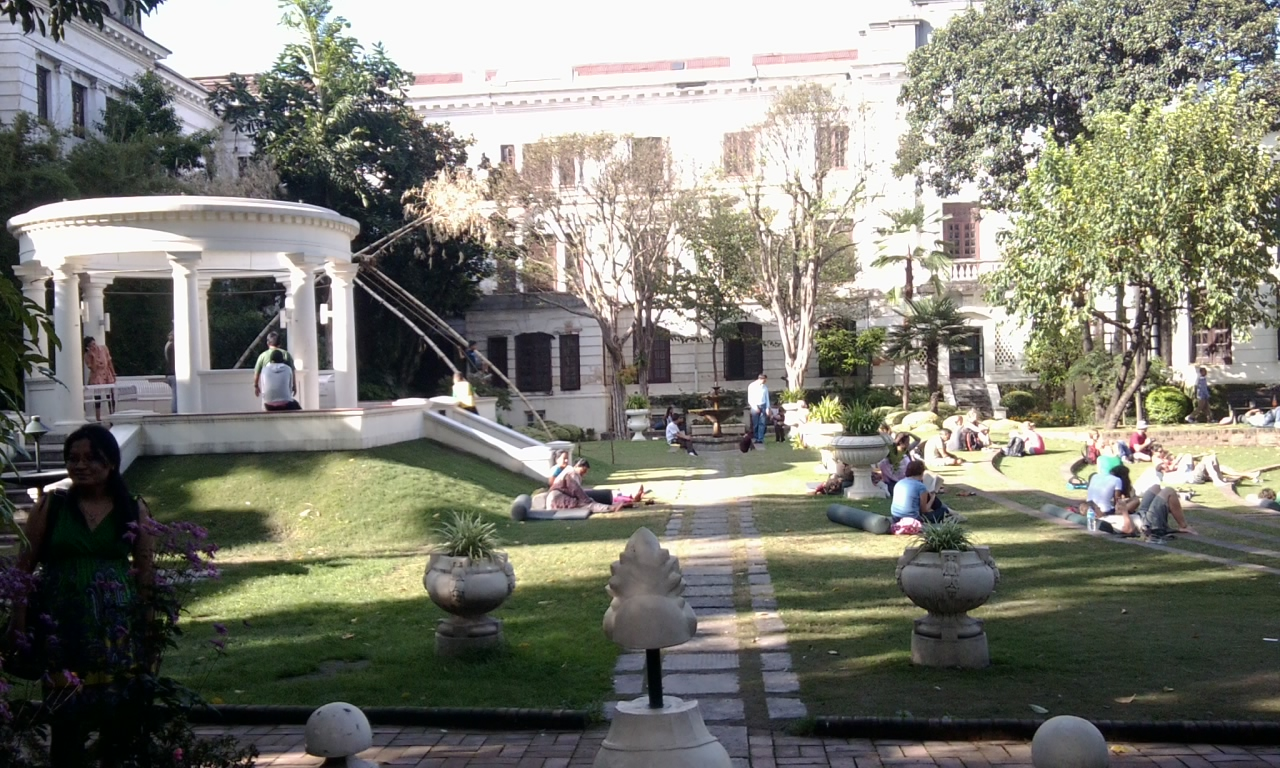

- Location within Nepal

General information
- Location: Kathmandu, Nepal, Nepal
- Coordinates: 27°42′51″N 85°18′53″E
- Client: Kaiser Shamsher Jang Bahadur Rana
- Owner: Government of Nepal

Technical details
- Floor area: 6,895 m^{2} (74,220 sq ft)

Design and construction
- Architect: Kishore Narsingh

Website
- gardenofdreams.org.np

References
- History of Garden of Dreams

The Garden of Dreams (Nepali:स्वप्न बगैंचा, Newar language : म्हगसया क्यब), also, the Garden of Six Seasons, is a neo-classical garden in Kaiser Mahal Kathmandu, Nepal, built in 1920. Designed by Kishore Narshingh, it consists of 6,895 square metres (74,220 sq ft) of gardens with three pavilions, an amphitheater, ponds, pergolas, and urns. From the mid-1960s, upon the death of its patron, Kaiser Sumsher Rana, it lay in neglect but was recently restored with the help of the Austrian government, under the supervision and design of the Late Götz Hagmüller.

In 1998, the old neo-classical garden in Keshar Mahal was to be demolished for the construction of a commercial center. However, Minister of Education Arjun Narsingha KC on the advice of Karna Shakya stopped the demolition work at once and declared it open to the public with a new name, "The Garden of Dreams".

== Design ==
The formal and axial arrangement of the architectural features stands in contrast to the more informal and natural planting – a juxtaposition consistent with that of the gardens created in England during the reign of Edward VII. Built in 1920, the garden was remarkably modern in its time, comparable to other garden designs in the first quarter of the 20th century. The architectural sophistication of the individual pavilions suggests that they were inspired by pattern books, with minor local adaptations. Surrounding the planting areas along the path's perimeter are sunken flower gardens with large ponds at their center.

== History ==
Located in Kaiser Mahal which is across the street from the former Royal Palace at the entrance to the Thamel tourist area, the Garden was made famous as the Garden of Six Seasons created for Field Marshal Kaiser Sumsher Rana (1892–1964), in early 1920. The Garden, which featured a design inspired by the Edwardian style, was considered one of the most sophisticated private gardens of that time. Landscape architect Kishore Narshingh, designer of Singha Durbar and architect to Shumsher's father, the Maharaja, designed and supervised the construction of the Garden of Dreams.

Within the Garden walls are pavilions, fountains, decorative garden furniture, and European-inspired features such as verandas, pergolas, balustrades, urns, and birdhouses. Each of the six pavilions, which provide the Garden's architectural framework, is dedicated to one of the six seasons in Nepal. After the death of Kaiser Sumsher, the garden was handed over to the government of Nepal, but it was not properly managed for decades. Today, only half of the original garden remains.

=== Renovations, 2000-2007 ===
After decades of neglect resulting in crumbling pavilions, overgrown paths and loss of the subtropical flora, restorations were undertaken between 2000 and 2007 with the support of Austrian Development Aid (the Austrian Government) in collaboration with the Nepal Ministry of Education. Implemented by Eco Himal. the renovation project has become a model project for the sustainable development of other historic sites. The garden, in its design and literary allusions, is linked to the collections of books about gardening, architecture, and literature, in Kaiser Shumsher's library. The work was led by the Austrian restoration architect Götz Hagmüller. With the restoration now complete, the garden has also been updated with the addition of modern facilities as well. In its reformed state, it provides an oasis of peace and tranquility within the urban bustle of Kathmandu and continues to be a tourist landmark.

=== Entrance Fee ===
The current cost to enter the Garden of Dreams is 400 Nepali rupees for a non-Nepali. Nepali pay 150 rupees.

== Views ==
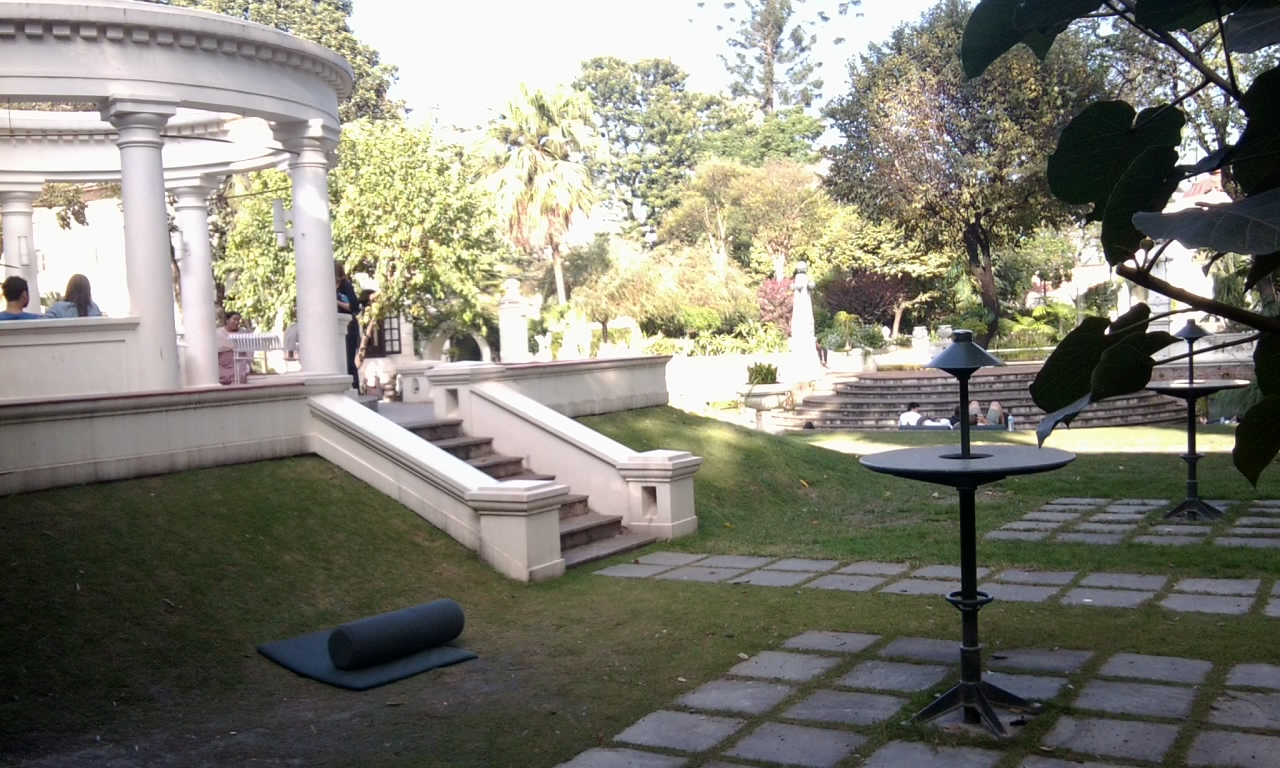
Garden of Dreams

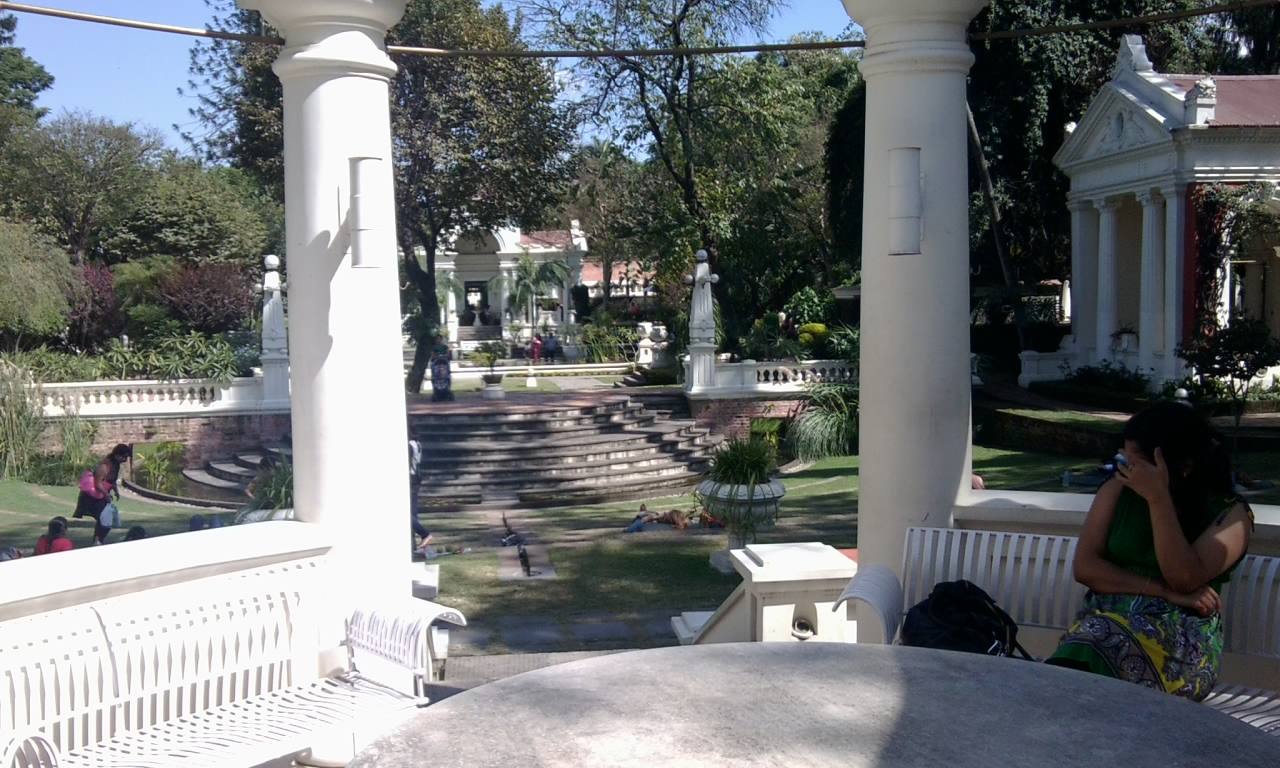
Garden of Dreams

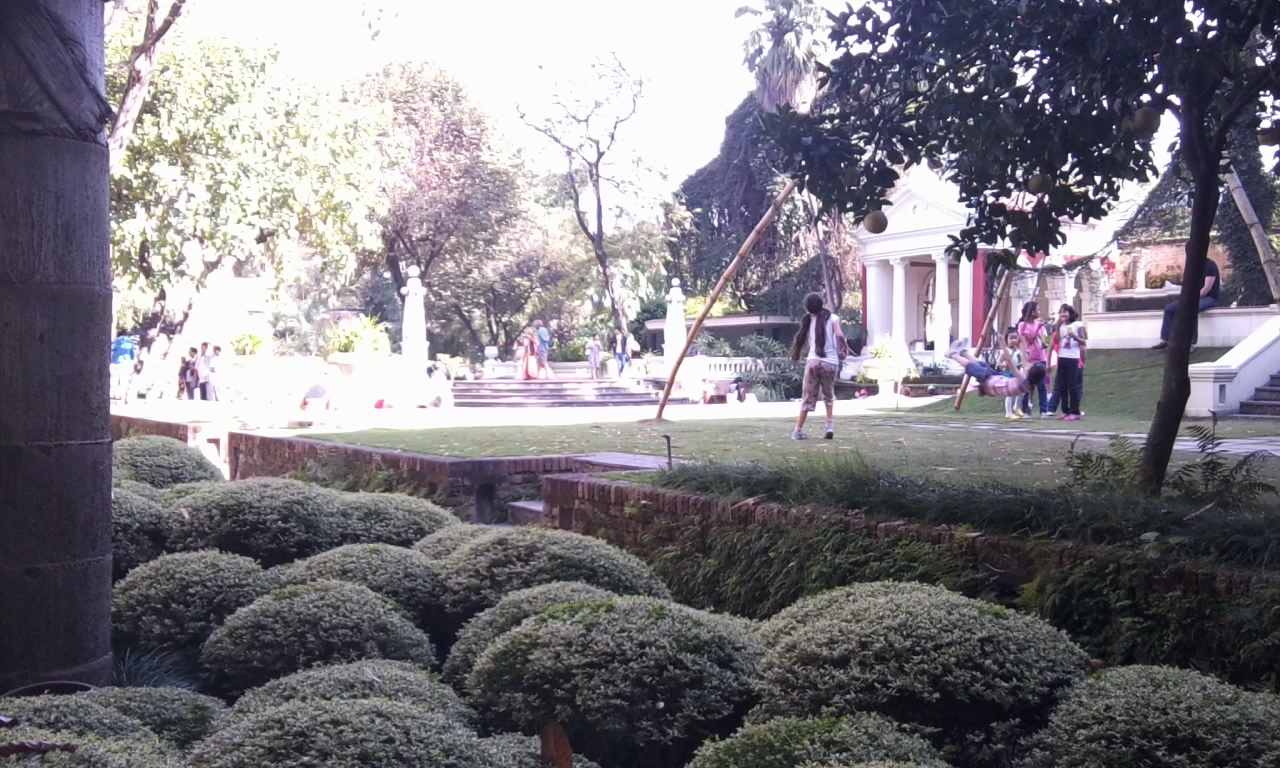
Garden of Dreams

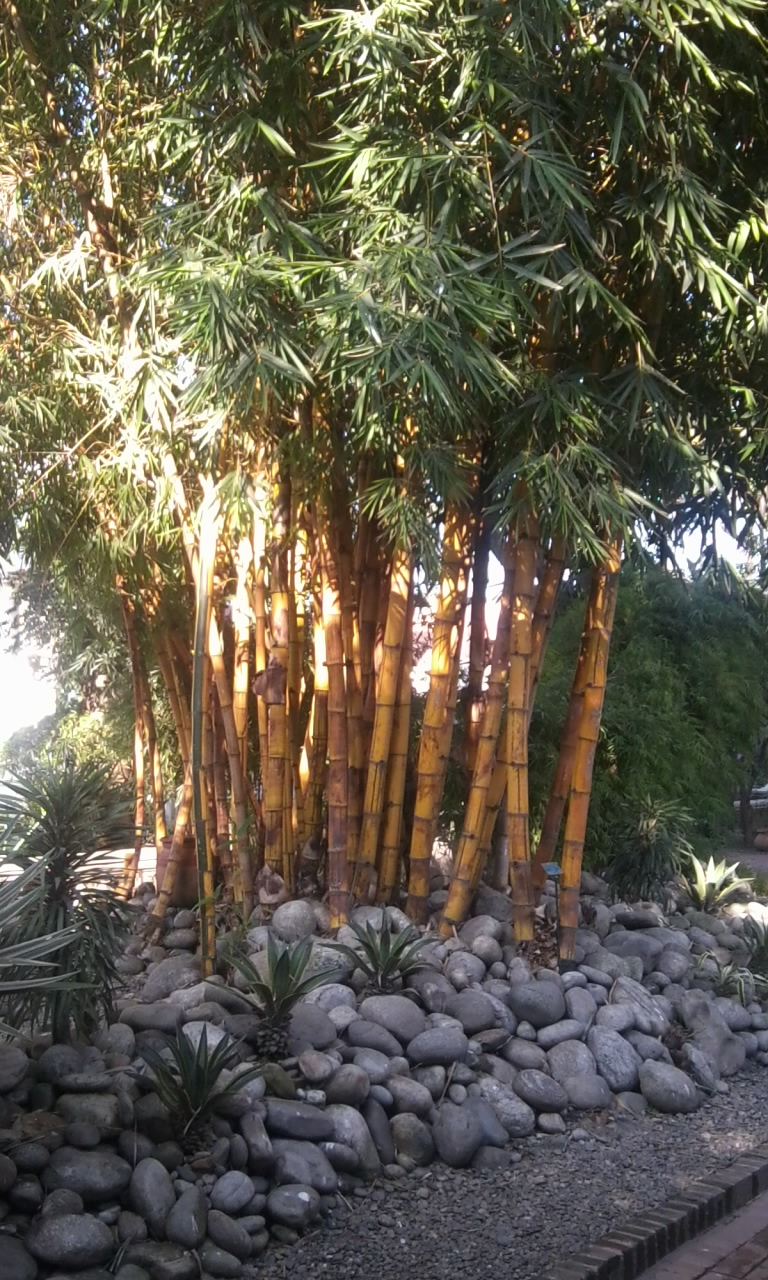
Yellow Bamboo

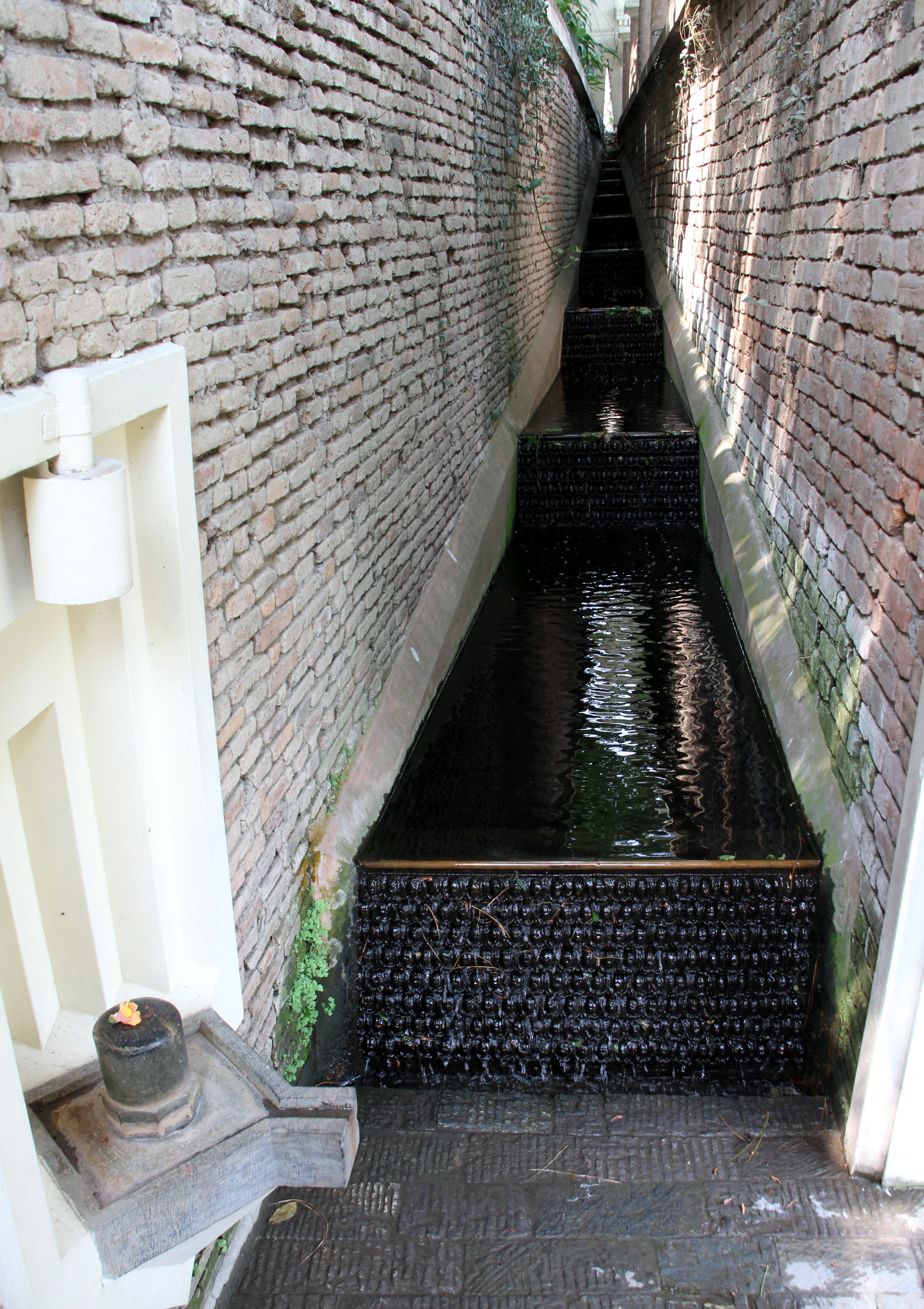
A fountain in the garden

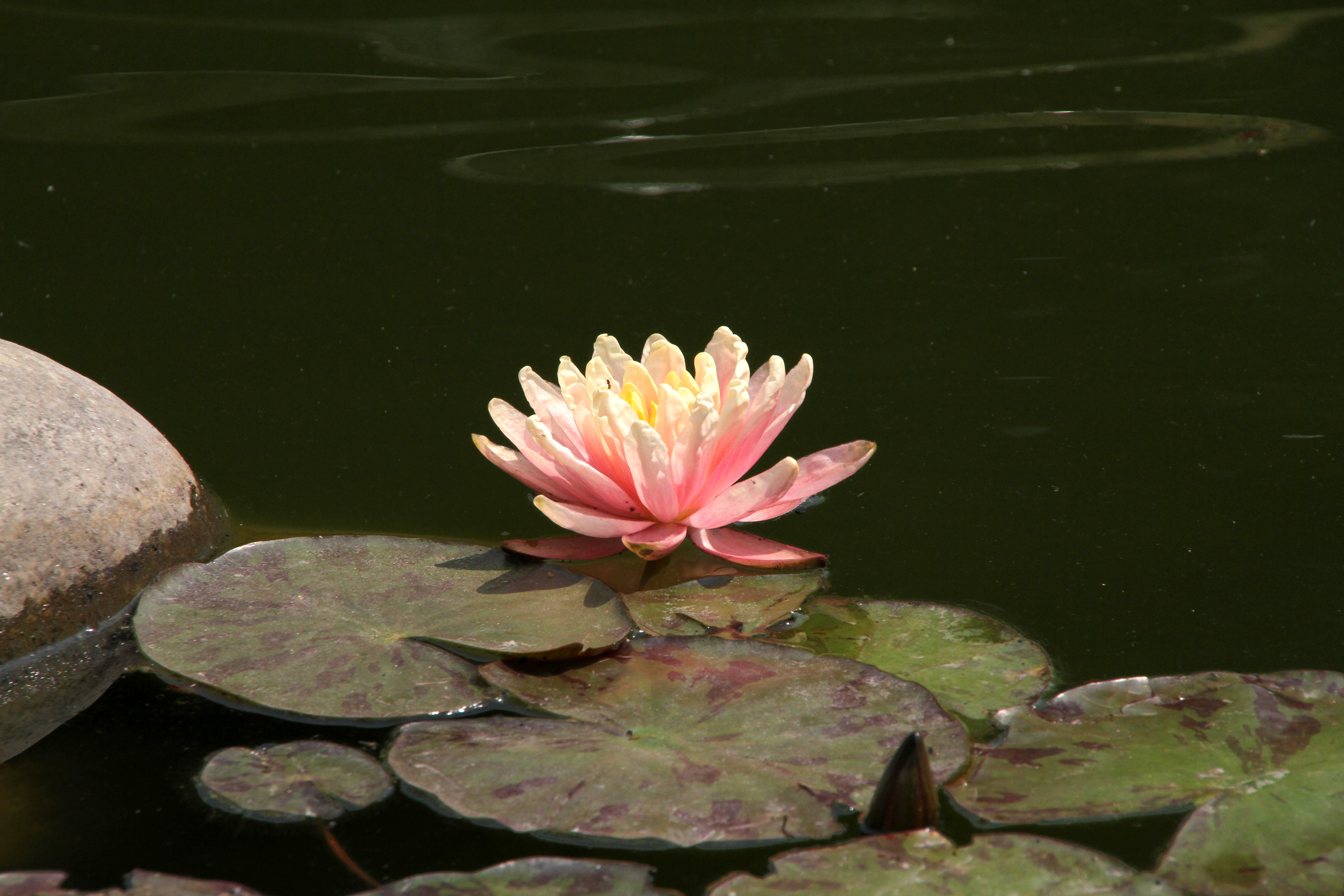
Water lily pond

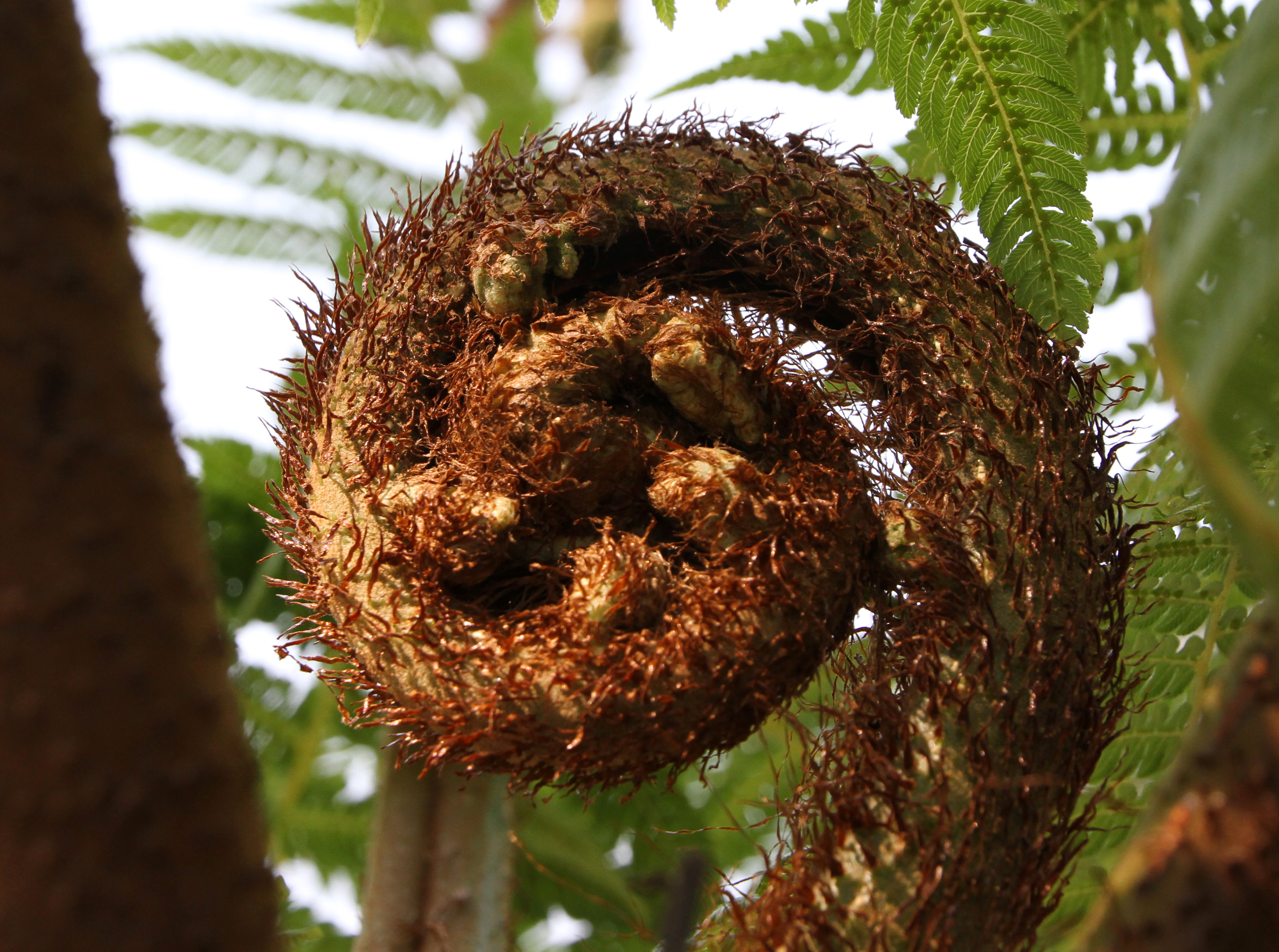
Tree fern

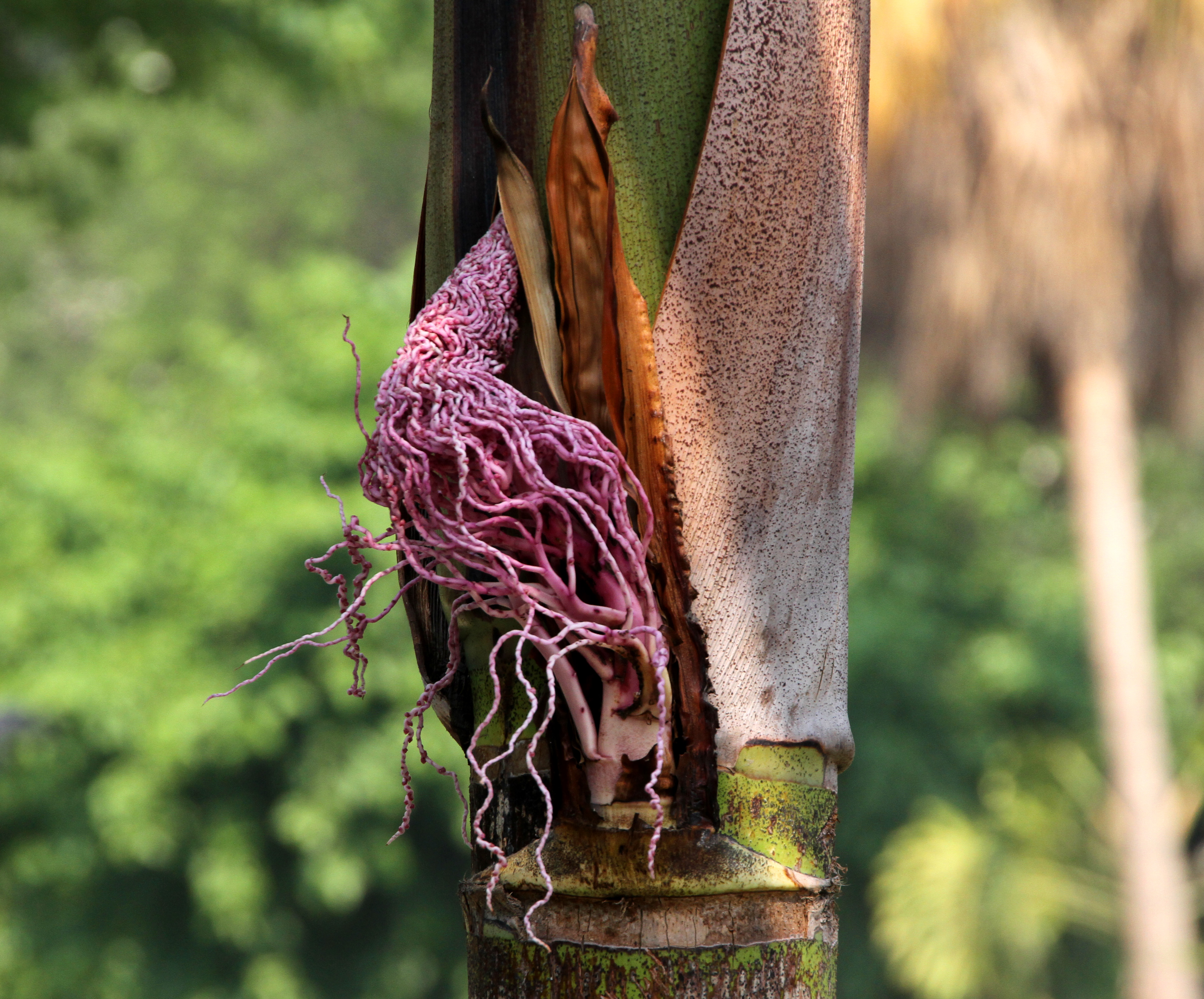
Part of a palm tree

== See also ==
- Kaiser Mahal
- Singha Durbar
- Rana palaces of Nepal
