= Kaiser Shumsher Jung Bahadur Rana =

Nepalese diplomat (1892–1964)

His Excellency Field Marshal Sir Kaiser Shamsher Jang Bahadur Rana
- महाराज अतिरथी श्री केसर शमशेर जङ्गबहादुर राणा
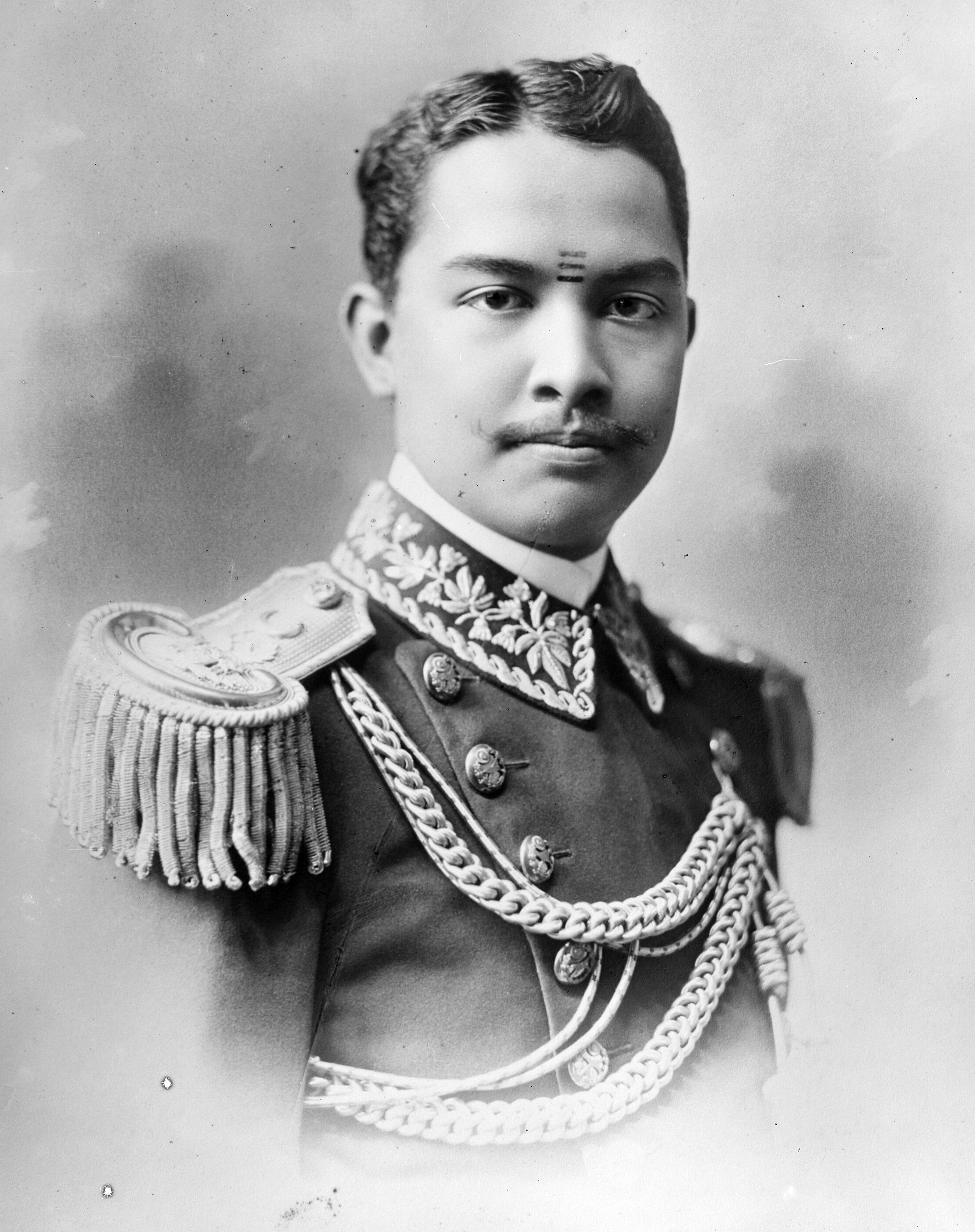
- Kesher Shumsher Jang Bahadur Rana

Personal details
- Born: 8 January 1892
- Died: 7 June 1964 (aged 72)
- Spouse(s): Princess Lakshmi Rajya Lakshmi Devi of Nepal (1895-1954), divorced, Krishna Chandra Kumari Devi
- Parents: Chandra Shamsher Jang Bahadur Rana (father); Bada Maharani Chandra Loka Bhaktha Rajya Lakshmi (mother)
- Awards: Nepal: Member of the Order of Ojaswi Rajanya, 1st Class.; Nepal: Member of the Order of Om Rama Pata, 1st Class.; Nepal: Member of the Order of the Three Divine Powers, 1st. Class.; Nepal: Member of the Order of Gorkha Right Arm, 1st. Class.; Nepal: Great Earthquake Medal (1935).; Nepal: Royal Jubilee Medal (11 December 1936).; Nepal: Long Service Medal (दीर्घ सेवा पदक); Nepal: King Mahendra Coronation Medal (2 May 1956).; United Kingdom: Delhi Durbar Medal (12 December 1911).; United Kingdom: King George VI Coronation Medal (1937).; United Kingdom: Honorary Knight Commander of the Order of the British Empire (KBE – 17 January 1924).; United Kingdom: Honorary Knight Grand Cross of the Order of the British Empire (GBE – 29 April 1937).; France: Knight Grand Cross of the Order of the Legion of Honour (24 May 1934).

Military service
- Allegiance: Nepal
- Rank: General
- Battles/wars: World War II

Field Marshal Sir Kaiser Shumsher Jung Bahadur Rana (8 January 1892 – 7 June 1964) was a field marshal in the Royal Nepalese Army. He was the third son of Maharaja Sir Chandra Shamsher Jang Bahadur Rana, the fifth Prime Minister of Nepal of the Rana dynasty and Bada Maharani Chandra Loka Bhaktha Rajya Lakshmi.

== Early life ==
He was the younger brother of Shree Tin Maharaja Sir Mohan Shamsher Jang Bahadur Rana and Sir Baber Shamsher Jang Bahadur Rana. From 1909 for some years he had Basanta Kumar Mallik as a tutor.

== Family ==
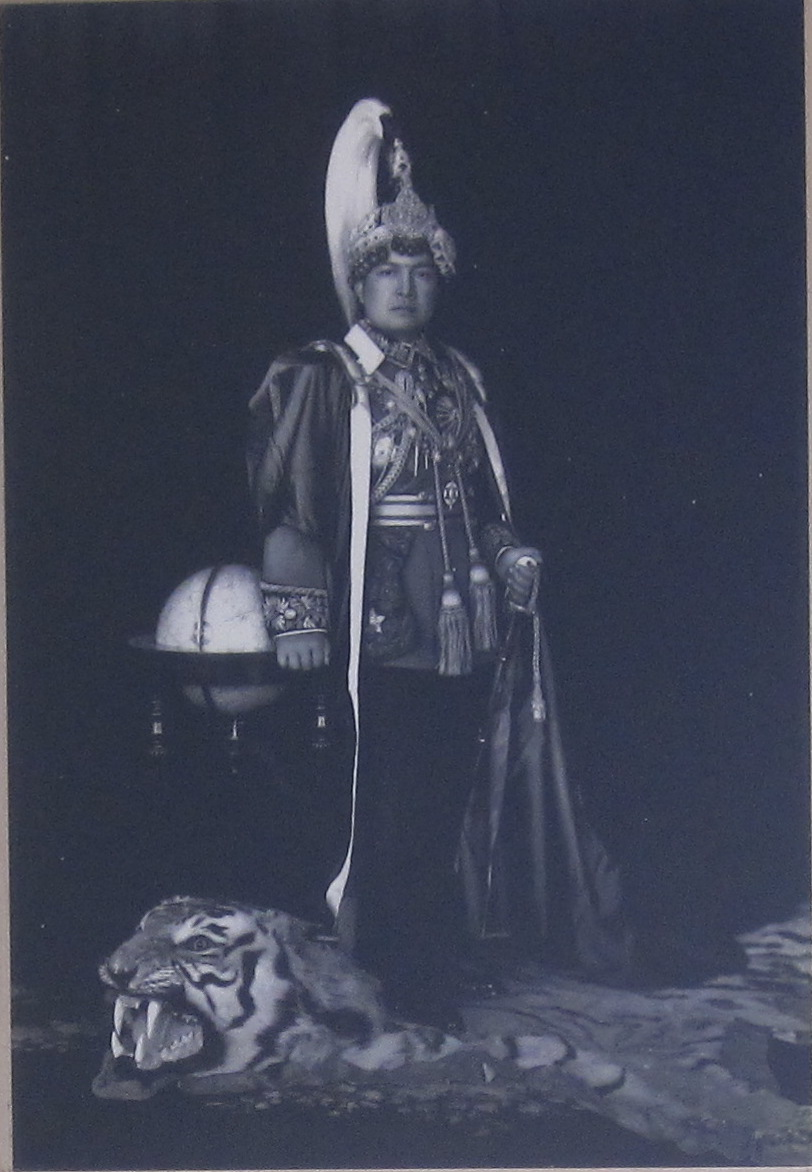
Kaiser Shamsher Jang Bahadur Rana

Kaiser Shumsher married twice and had five sons and five daughters. On 20 April 1904 he married his first wife at the Narayanhity Royal Palace in Kathmandu, Princess Lakshmi Rajya Laxmi Devi of Nepal (1895–1954), the then heir apparent and eldest daughter of King Prithvi Bir Bikram Shah of Nepal. Princess Lakshmi divorced General Kaiser after his intention to marry a junior wife who was meant to wed either one of his sons or nephews. This was the first legal divorce granted by the rulers of Nepal. In 1943 at Kaiser Mahal in Kathmandu, Kaiser Shumsher married Krishna Chandra Kumari Devi, daughter of Mukunda Bahadur Singh, of Bajura.

== Later life ==
During his lifetime Kaiser Shumsher occupied various posts and had many responsibilities both in the civil and the military administration. In 1901 he was appointed major general. In 1920 Kaiser Shumsher became a lieutenant general. In 1922–1930 he served as the chairman of the Kathmandu municipality. Later he was the Southern commanding general (1934–1945) and Eastern commanding general (1945–1947). Kaiser Shumsher worked as director general of various institutions, such as the Royal Museum (1928–1939), the Archaeology Department (1931–1939), and the Foreign Affairs Department (1932–1937). As a foreign minister of Nepal, he attended the ceremony of Coronation of King George VI and Queen Elizabeth on 12 May 1937 at Westminster Abbey in London. In 1947–48 Kaiser Shumsher was appointed as Nepal's ambassador to the Court of St. James. In 1951–53 he was commander-in-chief. He also served as minister of Defence (1951–1955) and minister of finance and administration (1952–53). In 1956 Kaiser Shamsher was promoted to field marshal. Kaiser Shamsher also had an interest in the sport of football, playing for Calcutta Football League clubs, East Bengal and Mohammedan Sporting. Notably, at Mohammedan Sporting, he would become the first hindu player to play for the club.

== Death ==
Kaiser Shumsher died on 7 June 1964 at the age of 72.

== Wealth ==
Kaiser Shumsher owned Kaiser Castle at Banaras Cantt in Banaras, India. The building was given out (free of rent) to the Zoological Survey of India from 1942 to 1949. A species of crustacean Nichollsia kashiense is found to have been discovered in the castle area.

== Kaiser Library ==
Kaiser Shumsher Jang Bahadur Rana was an avid book collector, and his personal library at the Kaiser Mahal is now open to the public. The Kaiser Library is situated in the Keshar Mahal near the Western Gate of the Narayanhity Royal Palace. The library, unique for its architecture, houses more than sixty thousand books, documents, periodicals and manuscripts. and is one of the oldest libraries in Nepal. From a very young age Kaiser Shumsher bought and collected books and newspapers, and visited England with his father. He was very much impressed by the government of England, as well as by the library system and the proper management of books there. Book collection was his hobby and his visit to Britain & British libraries led to the increase in the number of his books and change in the structure of his own library. From England, he brought back with him many books to Kathmandu. Access to the library was limited to the members of his family, special people of the nation and special visitors from abroad. In his will he bequeathed his library to the government, thereby making it a national property accessible to all. It was established in 1969 A.D. with the donated personal collection by his widow Krishna Chandra Kumari Devi.

== Honours ==
=== National honours ===
- Member of the Order of the Benevolent Ruler, 1st Class.
- Member of the Order of Om Rama Patta (Order of Rama Mantra Power), 1st Class.
- Member of the Order of the Three Divine Powers, 1st. Class.
- Member of the Order of Gurkha Right Hand, 1st. Class.
- Great Earthquake Medal (1935).
- Royal Jubilee Medal (11 December 1936).
- Long Service Medal.
- King Mahendra Coronation Medal (2 May 1956).

=== Foreign honours ===
- United Kingdom: Delhi Durbar Medal (12 December 1911).
- United Kingdom: King George VI Coronation Medal (1937).
- United Kingdom: Honorary Knight Commander of the Order of the British Empire (KBE – 17 January 1924).
- United Kingdom: Honorary Knight Grand Cross of the Order of the British Empire (GBE – 29 April 1937).
- France: Knight Grand Cross of the Order of the Legion of Honour (24 May 1934).

== See also ==
- Garden of Dreams
- Rana Dynasty
- Rana palaces of Nepal
