= Croall Lectures =

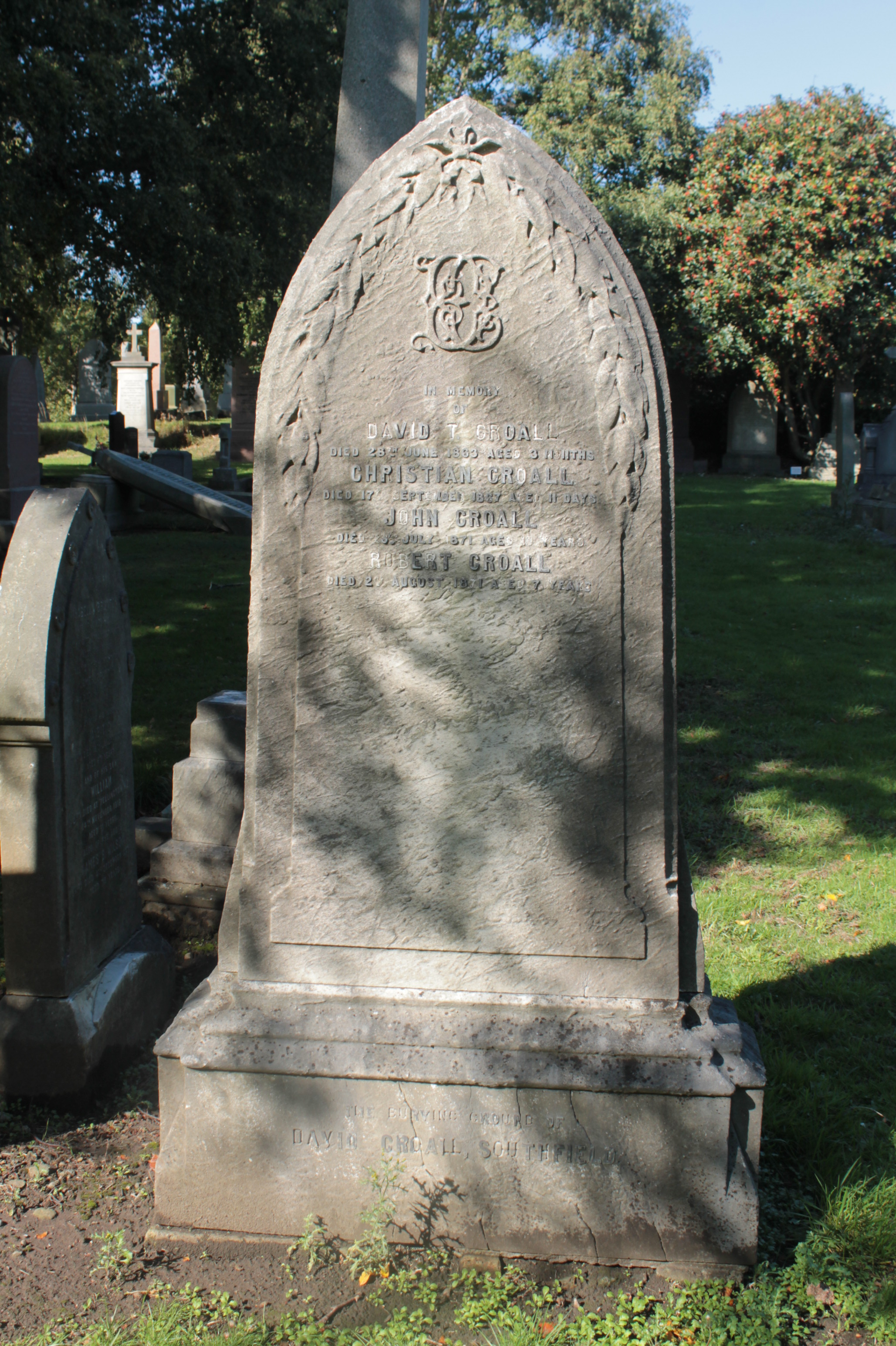
Grave of John Croall of Southfield, founder of the Croall Lectures

The Croall Lectures are a lecture series in Christian theology given in Edinburgh, and founded in 1876. The Lectures were endowed by John Croall of Southfield, who died in 1871.

== Lecturers ==
- 1876 John Tulloch
- 1878–79 John Caird, Philosophy of Religion
- 1879–80 William Milligan, The Resurrection of Our Lord
- 1882 Archibald Hamilton Charteris, The New Testament Scriptures: their claims, history, and authority
- 1885 John Cunningham, The Growth of the Church
- 1887 Robert Flint, Agnosticism
- 1889 Archibald Scott, Buddhism and Christianity; a Parallel and a Contrast
- 1892 William Hastie, The Theology of the Reformed Church
- 1893–94 James Robertson, Poetry and Religion of the Psalms
- 1897 Thomas Nicol, Recent Archaeology and the Bible
- 1899 Rev Prof John Patrick (Professor of Biblical Criticism), Clement of Alexandria
- 1901–02 Alexander Stewart, Creeds and Churches: Studies in Symbolics
- 1903–04 William Straton Bruce, Social Aspects of Christian Morality
- 1907–08 Andrew Wallace Williamson, The Person of Christ in the Faith of the Church
- 1911–12 George Milligan, The New Testament Documents, their origin and early history
- 1912–13 Andrew Blair Wann, The Message of Christ to India
- 1913? James Nicoll Ogilvie
- 1914 Archibald Robert Stirling Kennedy
- 1916 James Cooper
- 1918–19 William Leslie Davidson, Recent Theistic Discussion
- 1920–21 Rev Prof William Alexander Curtis'
- 1923 David Miller Kay, The Semitic Religions
- 1925 H. M. B. Reid, The Holy Spirit and the Mystics
- 1926–27 Henry Johnstone Wotherspoon, Religious Values in the Sacraments
- 1928 J. Garrow Duncan, Digging Up Biblical History. Recent Archaeology In Palestine And Its Bearing On The Old Testament
- 1930–31, Alexander Hetherwick, The Gospel and the African
- 1933 Hugh Ross Mackintosh, Types of Modern Theology, Schleiermacher to Barth
- 1936 Otto Piper, God in History
- 1937 George Simpson Duncan, Jesus, Son of Man: studies contributory to a modern portrait
- 1938–39 William Spence Urquhart. Humanism and Christianity
- 1942 Leonard Hodgson, The Doctrine of the Trinity
- 1944 John Henderson Seaforth Burleigh, The City of God; a study of St. Augustine's philosophy
- 1948 John A. Mackay, Ephesians
- 1948 John Mackenzie, Two Religions. A Comparative Study of Some Distinctive Ideas and Ideals in Hinduism and Christianity
- 1949 William Dickie Niven, Reformation Principles after Four Centuries
- 1951 George Stuart Hendry, The Gospel of the Incarnation
- 1953 James Brown, Subject and Object in Modern Theology
- 1954–57 George Barclay, The Ethical Vocabulary of Saint Paul
- 1955 John Gervase Riddell, The Calling of God
- 1960 James Stevenson McEwen, The Faith of John Knox
- 1960–61 Martin Andrew Simpson, Defender of the Faith, etcetera Elizabeth of England, her Church and Parliament, 1558–59
- 1965 David Haxton Carswell Read, Christian Ethics
- 1967, William Neil, The Apostolic Age, published as The Truth about the Early Church
- 1970 James Barr, The Bible in the Modern World
- 1972 Matthew Black, A Survey of Christological Thought, 1872-1972
- 1980 T. E. Pollard, Fullness of Humanity: Christ's Humanness and Ours
- 1983 D. W. D. (Bill) Shaw
- 1987 David S. M. Hamilton, Through the Waters: Baptism and the Christian life
- 1998 Frances Young
- 2005 John Barton, The Nature of Biblical Criticism
- 2011 Bruce Lindley McCormack, Abandoned by God: The Death of Christ in Systematic, Historical and Exegetical Perspective
- 2013 Marilynne Robinson, Son of God, Son of Man
- 2016 Linda Woodhead, Is Britain Still a Christian Country? Religion and values in the 21st century
- 2017 Werner Jeanrond, Hope
- 2018 Ian A. McFarland, Vere Deus, Vere Homo: Reflections on the Incarnation
- 2019 Guy D Stiebel, There is something new under the sun
