= 1928 Institute =

UK think tank

The 1928 Institute, formerly India League, is a think tank active in the United Kingdom.

== History ==
The think tank was co-founded by two academics at the University of Oxford in 2020, "to continue the work of the original India League", itself founded in 1928. Initially using the India League name, the think tank rebranded itself the 1928 Institute in October 2020. The 1928 Institute has run an online survey of British Indians, collecting socioeconomic data as well as information on political opinions, media representation of the community, religious identity, experience of racism and domestic violence, and the COVID-19 pandemic. In January 2021, the Institute announced that its research showed that 56 per cent of British Indians would take a COVID-19 vaccine, compared to 79 per cent of the overall population. One of the Institute's co-founders stated that "It seems that the Indian/south Asian population in general have been really falling prey to [misinformation] through things like WhatsApp forwards and fake news. And a lot of it seems to be directed at fertility, which is, I think, very interesting because there is no evidence to suggest that the vaccine causes fertility issues".

Writing for Byline Times, Amrit Wilson wrote that "while the India League saw the struggle in India as part of a larger struggle against imperialism and racism – and included such socialists and anti-imperialists as Harold Laski, Bertrand Russell and Fenner Brockway – the 1928 Institute's list of 'notable members' includes a corporate billionaire who admires [Narendra] Modi. Even the Prince of Udaipur, scion of one of India's most wealthy oppressor caste Rajput dynasties, is on board". The organisation responded by stating that it had "diverse members with no influence over the organisation".

As of April 2022, the 1928 Institute describes itself as "a not-for-profit University of Oxford spin-out" with a mission to "research and represent British Indians", "provide analysis on the emerging events in the Indian Sub-continent and within its diaspora" and "be a platform for dialogue for the diaspora and to disrupt 'echo-chambers'".

The Institute acts as the secretariat for the India (Trade and Investment) All Party Parliamentary Group, which was created in July 2022.
