= William Swan Urquhart =

William Swan Urquhart (1818 – 1881) was an Australian surveyor for the Government of Victoria.
