= Ingolf U. Dalferth =

German philosopher (born 1948)

Ingolf Ulrich Dalferth (born 9 July 1948) is a philosopher of religion and theologian. His work is regarded as being on the methodological borderlines between analytic philosophy, hermeneutics and phenomenology, and he is a recognized expert in issues of contemporary philosophy, philosophy of religion, and philosophy of orientation.

From 1995 to 2013 Dalferth was full professor of systematic theology, symbolics and philosophy of religion at the University of Zurich and from 2007 to 2020 he held the Danforth Chair in Philosophy of Religion at Claremont Graduate University. From 1998 to 2012 he served as the director of the Institute of Hermeneutics and Philosophy of Religion at the University of Zürich. Since 2013 he is professor emeritus at the University of Zurich, since 2020 professor emeritus at Claremont Graduate University. From 2000 to 2020 he was editor-in-chief of the journal Theologische Literaturzeitung (Leipzig, Germany), of the book series Religion in Philosophy und Theology (Tübingen, Germany) and of the book series Claremont Studies in the Philosophy of Religion, from 1996-2018 also editor of the Hermeneutische Untersuchungen zur Theologie (Tübingen, Germany).

== Biography ==
Dalferth studied theology, philosophy, and linguistics in Tübingen, Edinburgh, Vienna, and Cambridge. After receiving his doctorate and habilitation in theology at the University of Tübingen, he held various positions including director of studies at the Tübinger Stift, lecturer in Durham, and professor in Tübingen, Uppsala and Frankfurt a. M. From 1987 to 1989 he was Hulsean Lecturer at the University of Cambridge, 1995 the Samuel Ferguson Lecturer at Manchester University, in 2008 the Bapsybanoo Marchioness of Winchester Lecturer at the University of Oxford. In 2019 he gave the Prabhu Interfaith, Peace and Justice Lecture at Cal State Los Angeles, in 2020 (together with Claudia Welz) the Tillich-Lecture 2020 in Frankfurt am Main, in 2021 die Davide Zordan Lecture in Trento/Italy, and in 2022 the Marsilius-Lecture in Heidelberg. From 1986-1988, 1996-1998 and 2004-2006 he was president of the European Society for the Philosophy of Religion. From 1999 to 2007 he was the founding president of the German Society for Philosophy of Religion. In 2015-2016 he was president of the Society for Philosophy of Religion in the USA. From 2001 to 2013 he served as a member of the Norris-Hulse-Standing Commission, University of Cambridge, from 2001 to 2013 he was a member of the advisory board of the Center for Subjectivity Research Copenhagen, and since 2002 he has been at board of the Søren Kierkegaard Research Centre Copenhagen. From 1981 to 1990 Dalferth was lecturer and university professor of systematic theology at the University of Tübingen, from 1990 to 1995 professor of protestant theology (dogmatics) and philosophy of religion at the University of Frankfurt, from 1995 to 2013 professor of systematic theology, symbolics and philosophy of religion at the University of Zürich. From 2007 to 2020 he was the Danforth Professor of Philosophy of Religion at Claremont Graduate University. From 1991 to 1994 he served as the dean of the Faculty of Protestant Theology at the University of Frankfurt, Germany, and from 1998 to 2002 as the dean of the Faculty of Theology at the University of Zurich. From 2004 to 2009 he was research fellow at the Collegium Helveticum in Zurich, from 2005 to 2006 fellow at the Institute for Advanced Study in Berlin. In 2020 he was the first IRF Fellow at the Institute for Research on the Philosophy of Religion at Goethe University Frankfurt am Main, and in 2023 fellow at the Stellenbosch Institute for Advanced Study in South Africa. In 2005 and 2006 he was awarded honorary doctorates from the universities of Uppsala and Copenhagen. 2017-2018 he held the Leibniz-Chair at the University of Leipzig. In 2022 he received the Marsilius Medal for promoting conversation between the cultures of science and knowledge at the University of Heidelberg. In 2018 he was honored with a Festschrift: Das Letzte – der Erste. Gott denken. Festschrift für Ingolf U. Dalferth zum 70. Geburtstag. Ed. Hans-Peter Großhans, Michael Moxter, and Philipp Stoellger, Tübingen 2018. pp. XI, 504.

== Work ==
The primary research areas of Ingolf U. Dalferth include Christological, ecclesiological, and methodological issues in systematic theology, religion, philosophy (analytic philosophy of religion and phenomenology), semiotics and hermeneutics (theory of signs, language processes, forms of understanding), theories of God, emotions, trust, evil and time, and ecumenism (Lutheranism and Anglicanism). His work also includes several functions within the Swiss and German churches and the ecumenical movement. From 1993 to 2004 he was co-chair of the Theological Board of the Meissen Commission. In 1997 he was Visiting Professor of Dogmatics at the University of Fribourg, Switzerland; in 1998 Visiting Professor at the Faculty of Theology at the University of Utrecht; in 2004 Visiting Professor of Philosophy of Religion at the Center for Subjectivity Research in Copenhagen (Denmark); in 2006 Visiting Professor at the Faculty of Theology at the University of Aarhus; from 2004 to 2009 Director of the Research Group ›Religion and Emotion‹ at the Collegium Helveticum in Zurich; from 2005 to 2013 Co-Director of the University Research Priority Program on the Foundations of Human Social Behavior at the University of Zurich; from 2009 to 2013 Director of the Interdisciplinary Research Project ›Understanding Trust‹ at the University of Zurich; from 2009 to 2019 Research Professor at the Swiss Federal Institute of Technology Zurich (Collegium Helveticum); from 2013 to 2015 Director of the Research Project ›Christian Truth in the Context of Postmodern Pluralism: Revelation between Tradition and Deconstruction‹; from 2014 to 2016 Director of the Interdisciplinary Research Project ›Prayer as Embodied Understanding‹ at the University of Zurich.

== Selected publications ==
- Einer für Alle: Evangelische Theologie im Geist des Evangeliums, Leipzig: EVA 2026. ISBN 978-3-374-08098-4
- The Mystery of Existence: Philosophy of Religion and the Existential Turn, Leipzig: EVA 2025. ISBN 978-3-374-07360-3
- We: Humanity, Community, and the Right to Be Different, Tübingen: Mohr Siebeck 2024. ISBN 978-3-16-163890-9, 978-3-16-163891-6
- The Passion of Possibility: Studies on Kierkegaard's Post-Metaphysical Theology, Berlin/Boston: Walter de Gruyter 2023. ISBN 978-3-11-102330-4
- Auferweckung. Plädoyer für ein anderes Paradigma der Christologie, Leipzig: EVA 2023. ISBN 978-3-374-07360-3.
- Illusionen der Unmittelbarkeit. Über einen missverstandenen Modus der Lebenswelt, Tübingen: Mohr Siebeck 2022. ISBN 978-3-16-161880-2.
- Die Krise der öffentlichen Vernunft. Über Demokratie, Urteilskraft und Gott, Leipzig: EVA 2022. ISBN 978-3-374-07056-5.
- The Priority of the Possible. Outlines of a Contemplative Philosophy of Orientation, Newcastle upon Tyne: Cambridge Scholars Publishing 2021. ISBN 978-1-5275-7321-5.
- Deus Praesens. Gottes Gegenwart und christlicher Glaube, Tübingen: Mohr Siebeck 2021. ISBN 978-3-16-160657-1.
- Gegenwart. Eine philosophische Studie in theologischer Absicht, Tübingen: Mohr Siebeck 2021. ISBN 978-3-16-160658-8.
- Das Böse. Essay über die kulturelle Denkform des Unbegreiflichen. 2., durchgesehene Auflage. Mohr Siebeck, Tübingen 2010. ISBN 978-3-16-150489-1.
- Sünde. Die Entdeckung der Menschlichkeit, Leipzig: EVA 2020.
- Transcendence and the Secular World: Life in orientation to ultimate presence. Translated by Jo Bennet, Tübingen: Mohr Siebeck 2018.
- God first: Die reformatorische Revolution der christlichen Denkungsart, Leipzig: EVA 2018.
- Wirkendes Wort: Bibel, Schrift und Evangelium im Leben der Kirche und im Denken der Theologie, Leipzig: EVA 2018.
- Die Kunst des Verstehens. Grundzüge einer Hermeneutik der Kommunikation durch Texte, Tübingen: Mohr Siebeck 2018, ISBN 978-3-16-155623-4.
- Creatures of Possibility: The Theological Basis of Human Freedom, Grand Rapids: Baker Academic 2016.
- Hoffnung (Grundthemen der Philosophie), Berlin: de Gruyter 2016.
- Radical Theology: An Essay on Faith and Theology in the Twenty-First Century, Minneapolis, MN: Fortress Press 2016.
- Transzendenz und säkulare Welt, Tübingen: Mohr Siebeck 2015.
- Selbstlose Leidenschaften. Christlicher Glaube und menschliche Passionen, Tübingen: Mohr Siebeck 2013.
- Umsonst. Eine Erinnerung an die kreative Passivität des Menschen, Tübingen: Mohr Siebeck 2011.ISBN 978-3-16-150940-7
- Die Kontingenz des Bösen, in: Das Böse. Drei Annäherungen, hg. von dem Forschungsinstitut für Philosophie Hannover, Freiburg i. Br. 2011 (daneben die Beiträge von Karl Kardinal Lehmann, Die Frage nach dem Ursprung des Bösen, und von Navid Kermani, Islamische Deutungen des Unheils auf der Welt), S. 9-52. ISBN 978-3-451-34057-4
- Radikale Theologie. Glauben im 21. Jahrhundert. Evangelische Verlagsanstalt, Leipzig 2010. ISBN 978-3-374-02786-6
- Malum. Theologische Hermeneutik des Bösen, Tübingen 2008. ISBN 978-3-16-149447-5
- Bibel in gerechter Sprache? Kritik eines misslungenen Versuchs. Mohr Siebeck, Tübingen 2007. ISBN 978-3-16-149448-2
- Das Böse. Essay über die kulturelle Denkform des Unbegreiflichen. Mohr Siebeck, Tübingen 2006. ISBN 978-3-16-149031-6
- Leiden und Böses. Vom schwierigen Umgang mit Widersinnigem. Evangelische Verlansanstalt, Leipzig 2006. ISBN 978-3-374-02411-7
- Becoming Present. An Inquiry into the Christian Sense of the Presence of God, Leuven/Paris/Dudley 2006.
- Evangelische Theologie als Interpretationspraxis. Eine systematische Orientierung, Leipzig 2004. ISBN 978-3-374-02120-8
- Die Wirklichkeit des Möglichen. Hermeneutische Religionsphilosophie, Tübingen 2003.
- Auf dem Weg der Ökumene. Die Gemeinschaft evangelischer und anglikanischer Kirchen nach der Meissener Erklärung, Leipzig 2002. ISBN 978-3-374-01949-6
- Gedeutete Gegenwart. Zur Wahrnehmung Gottes in den Erfahrungen der Zeit, Tübingen 1997.
- Der auferweckte Gekreuzigte. Zur Grammatik der Christologie. Mohr, Tübingen 1994. ISBN 3-16-146296-3
- Jenseits von Mythos und Logos. Die christologische Transformation der Theologie, Freiburg u.a. 1993.
- Gott. Philosophisch-theologische Denkversuche, Tübingen 1992.
- Kombinatorische Theologie. Probleme theologischer Rationalität. QD 130, Herder, Freiburg u.a. 1991. ISBN 3-451-02130-7
- Theology and Philosophy, Oxford 1988.
- Existenz Gottes und christlicher Glaube. Skizzen zu einer eschatologischen Ontologie, München 1984.
- Religiöse Rede von Gott, Studien zur Analytischen Religionsphilosophie und Theologie, München 1981.
- Sprachlogik des Glaubens. Texte analytischer Religionsphilosophie und Theologie zur religiösen Sprache, herausgegeben, übersetzt und mit einer Einleitung versehen, München: Chr. Kaiser 1974.

=== Edited works ===
- I. U. Dalferth/ M.A. Block (eds.), Autonomy, Diversity, and the Common Good, Claremont Studies in the Philosophy of Religion, Conference 2020, Tübingen: Mohr Siebeck 2023.
- I. U. Dalferth/ R. E. Perrier (eds.), Humanity: An Endangered Idea? Claremont Studies in the Philosophy of Religion, Conference 2019, Tübingen: Mohr Siebeck 2023.
- I. U. Dalferth/ R. E. Perrier (eds.), The Unique, the Singular, and the Individual. Claremont Studies in the Philosophy of Religion, Conference 2018, Tübingen: Mohr Siebeck 2022.
- I. U. Dalferth/ T. W. Kimball (eds.), The Meaning and Power of Negativity. Claremont Studies in the Philosophy of Religion, Conference 2017, Tübingen: Mohr Siebeck 2021.
- I. U. Dalferth/ T. W. Kimball (eds.), Love and Justice. Consonance or Dissonance? Claremont Studies in the Philosophy of Religion, Conference 2016, Tübingen: Mohr Siebeck 2019.
- I.U. Dalferth (ed.), Reformation und Säkularisierung. Zur Kontroverse um die Genese der Moderne aus dem Geist der Reformation, Tübingen: Mohr Siebeck 2017.
- I.U. Dalferth/ T.W. Kimball (eds.), Self or No-Self? The Debate about Selflessness and the Sense of Self, Claremont Studies in the Philosophy of Religion, Conference 2015, Tübingen: Mohr Siebeck 2017.
- I.U. Dalferth/M.A. Block (eds.), Hope. Claremont Studies in the Philosophy of Religion, Conference 2014, Tübingen: Mohr Siebeck 2016.
- I.U. Dalferth/S. Peng-Keller (Hg.), Beten als verleiblichtes Verstehen. Neue Zugänge zu einer Hermeneutik des Gebets, Freiburg im Breisgau: Herder 2016.
- I.U. Dalferth/P. Bühler/A. Hunziker (Hg.), Hermeneutik der Transzendenz, Tübingen: Mohr Siebeck 2015.
- I.U. Dalferth/M.A. Block (eds.), Hermeneutics and the Philosophy of Religion: The Legacy of Paul Ricoeur. Claremont Studies in the Philosophy of Religion, Conference 2013, Tübingen: Mohr Siebeck 2015.
- I.U. Dalferth/M.Ch. Rodgers (eds.), Revelation, Claremont Studies in the Philosophy of Religion, Conference 2012, Tübingen: Mohr Siebeck 2014.
- I.U. Dalferth/S. Peng-Keller (Hg.), Vertrauen Interdisziplinär, Zürich 2013.
- I.U. Dalferth/A. Hunziker (eds.), Gott denken – ohne Metaphysik? Zu einer aktuellen Kontroverse in Theologie und Philosophie, Tübingen: Mohr Siebeck. 2013.
- I.U. Dalferth/M.Ch. Rodgers (eds.), Conversion, Claremont Studies in the Philosophy of Religion, Conference 2011, Tübingen: Mohr Siebeck 2013
- I.U. Dalferth/S. Peng-Keller (eds.), Grundvertrauen. Hermeneutik eines Grenzphänomens, Leipzig: Evangelische Verlagsanstalt 2013.
- I.U. Dalferth/M. Rodgers (eds.), Skeptical Faith, Tübingen: Mohr Siebeck 2012.
- I.U. Dalferth/S. Peng-Keller (eds.), Gottvertrauen. Die ökumenische Diskussion um die fiducia, Freiburg i. Br./Basel/Wien 2012.
- I.U. Dalferth/P. Bühler/A. Hunziker (eds.), Hermeneutische Theologie – heute? Tübingen: Mohr Siebeck 2012.
- I.U. Dalferth/S. Peng-Keller (eds.), Kommunikation des Vertrauens, Leipzig: Evangelische Verlagsanstalt 2012.
- I.U. Dalferth/M. Rodgers (eds.), Passion and Passivity, Religion in Philosophy and Theology 61, Tübingen: Mohr Siebeck 2011.
- I.U. Dalferth/S. Berg (eds.), Gestalteter Klang – gestalteter Sinn. Orientierungsstrategien in Musik und Religion im Wandel der Zeit, Evangelische Verlagsanstalt: Leipzig 2011.
- I.U. Dalferth/H. Schulz (eds.), Religion und Konflikt. Grundlagen und Fallanalysen, Research in Contemporary Religion, Göttingen: Vandenhoeck & Ruprecht 2011.
- I.U. Dalferth/A. Hunziker (eds.), Seinkönnen. Der Mensch zwischen Möglichkeit und Wirklichkeit, Religion in Philosophy and Theology 54, Tübingen: Mohr Siebeck 2011.
- I.U. Dalferth/H. von Sass (eds.), The Contemplative Spirit. D.Z. Phillips on Religion and the Limits of Philosophy, Religion in Philosophy and Theology 49, Tübingen: Mohr Siebeck 2010.
- I.U. Dalferth (eds.), The Presence and Absence of God, Religion in Philosophy and Theology, Tübingen: Mohr Siebeck 2009.
- I.U. Dalferth/Ph. Stoellger/A. Hunziker (eds.), Unmöglichkeiten. Zur Phänomenologie und Hermene-utik eines modalen Grenzbegriffs, Religion in Philosophy and Theology 38, Tübingen: Mohr Siebeck 2009.
- I.U. Dalferth/Ph. Stoellger (eds.), Gott nennen. Gottes Namen und Gott als Name, Religion in Philosophy and Theology 35, Tübingen: Mohr Siebeck 2008.
- I.U. Dalferth/A. Hunziker unter Mitarbeit von A. Anker (eds.), Mitleid. Konkretionen eines strittigen Konzepts, Religion in Philosophy and Theology 28, Tübingen: Mohr Siebeck 2007.
- I.U. Dalferth/J. Schröter (eds.), Bibel in gerechter Sprache? Kritik eines misslungenen Projekts, Tübingen: Mohr Siebeck 2007.
- I.U Dalferth/Ph. Stoellger (eds.): Hermeneutik der Religion, Religion in Philosophy and Theology 27, Tübingen: Mohr Siebeck 2007.
- I.U Dalferth et al. (eds.), Eine Wissenschaft oder viele? Die Einheit evangelischer Theo¬logie in der Sicht ihrer Disziplinen, ThLZ.F.17, Leipzig: Evangelische Verlagsanstalt 2006.
- I.U. Dalferth/ H.-P. Grosshans (eds.): Kritik der Religion. Zur Aktualität einer unerledigten philoso-phischen und theologischen Aufgabe. Tübingen: Mohr Siebeck 2006.
- I.U. Dalferth/Ph. Stoellger (eds.), Interpretation in den Wissenschaften, Interpretation Interdisziplinär Bd. 3, Würzburg: Königshausen & Neumann 2005.
- I.U. Dalferth/ Ph. Stoellger (eds.), Krisen der Subjektivität: Problemfelder eines strittigen Paradigmas, Tübingen: Mohr Siebeck 2005.
- I.U. Dalferth/ C.R. Famos (eds.), Das Recht der Kirche. Zur Revision der Zürcher Kirchenordnung, Zürich: TVZ 2004.
- I.U. Dalferth/Ph. Stoellger (eds.), Wahrheit in Perspektiven. Probleme einer offenen Konstellation, Religion in Philosophy and Theology 14, Tübingen: Mohr Siebeck 2004.
- I.U. Dalferth/J. Fischer/ H.-P. Großhans (eds.), Denkwürdiges Geheimnis. Beiträge zur Gotteslehre. Festschrift für Eberhard Jüngel zum 70. Geburtstag, Tübingen: Mohr Siebeck 2004.
- I.U. Dalferth/P. Oppenheim (eds.), Einheit bezeugen. Zehn Jahre nach der Meissener Erklärung. Beiträge zu den theologischen Konferenzen von Springe und Cheltenham zwischen der Evangelischen Kirche in Deutschland und der Kirche von England/Witnessing to Unity. Ten years after the Meissen Declaration, Frankfurt a.M.: Lembeck 2003.
- I.U. Dalferth (ed.), Ethik der Liebe. Studien zu Kierkegaards ‚Taten der Liebe‘, Tübingen: Mohr Siebeck 2002.
- I.U. Dalferth/E. Jüngel (eds.), Karl Barth, Fides quaerens intellectum. Anselms Beweis der Existenz Gottes im Zusammenhang seines theologischen Programms (1931), Zürich 32002.
- I.U. Dalferth/Ph. Stoellger (eds.), Vernunft, Kontingenz und Gott, Konstellationen eines offenen Problems, Religion in Philosophy and Theology 1, Tübingen: Mohr Siebeck 2000.
- I.U. Dalferth/H.J. Luibl/H. Weder (eds.), Die Wissenschaften und Gott, Zürich/Freiburg 1998.
- I.U. Dalferth/H.J. Luibl/ H. Weder (eds.), Europa verstehen. Zum europäischen Gestus der Universalität, Zürich: Pano 1997.
- I.U. Dalferth/E. Jüngel (eds.), Karl Barth. Fides quaerens intellectum, Zürich: TVZ 1981.
