= Babarmahal Revisited =

Heritage complex in Kathmandu

Baber Mahal Revisited is a heritage complex in Kathmandu containing restaurants and shops. The complex comprises restaurants, art galleries and book shops.

The complex was constructed by Gautam Sumsher Rana, a great grandson of Rana Prime Minister Chandra Shumsher Rana modifying the stable of the Babar Mahal, residence of Baber Shamsher Jang Bahadur Rana constructed in 1913.

Baithak Restaurant is one of the renowned restaurants in Kathmandu Shalon de cafe Restaurant, SOL Delicatessen, Shogun Japanese Restaurant also located inside this complex. The complex has started its night bazaar recently.

== See also ==
- Rana palaces of Nepal
