= William Spence Urquhart =

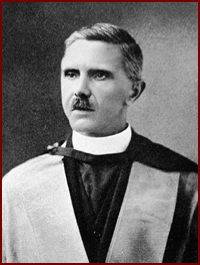
- Portrait c. 1928
- Born: 8 May 1877; Annandale, Woolston, Southampton, England
- Died: July 16, 1964 (aged 87); Torphins, Aberdeenshire, Scotland
- Education: University of Aberdeen; New College, Edinburgh; University of Marburg; University of Göttingen
- Occupations: Religious scholar, Christian missionary, academic
- Relatives: Alexander Urquhart (brother); Roy Urquhart (nephew)
- Theological work
- Tradition or movement: United Free Church of Scotland
- Main interests: Philosophy, Indian religions, Christian theology

William Spence Urquhart (8 May 1877 – 16 July 1964) was a Scottish religious scholar, Christian missionary and academic in India. He influenced among others one of his college students, the religious leader A. C. Bhaktivedanta Swami Prabhupada.

== Early life ==
He was born in Annandale, Woolston, Southampton, the youngest of three children of Rev. Robert Urquhart, a minister of the Free Church of Scotland at Old Meldrum, and Mary Jane Spence. Alexander Urquhart M.D. (1872–1958), father of Roy Urquhart, was his elder brother. His early education was at Old Meldrum parish school. He went on to school in Old Aberdeen, and in 1892–3 was at Gordon's College.

Urquhart graduated M.A. in philosophy at the University of Aberdeen in 1897, having studied under W. R. Sorley. From 1898 to 1902 he was a theological student at New College, Edinburgh, where Andrew B. Davidson was a significant influence. He spoke good German and attended the University of Marburg (1899) and University of Göttingen (1901), making important contacts for later life, respectively Wilhelm Herrmann and Rudolf Otto.

In 1902 Urquhart became a minister of the United Free Church of Scotland. Under the influence of George Smith, and against the advice of academic contacts, he chose to become a missionary in Calcutta.

== Calcutta ==
On 23 December 1902, a few days after his ordination, Urquhart embarked on a sea voyage to India. He became an academic at Duff College, Calcutta; which in 1908 was merged into Scottish Church College. He struck up a friendship with Basanta Kumar Mallik. In 1913 he took over the management of the periodical Calcutta Review, editing it to 1921.

Subhas Chandra Bose attended Scottish Church College from 1919, and Urquhart is reported by Schmidt to have spoken for his admission. A. C. Bhaktivedanta was one of Urquhart's students, and according to William Sweet was much influenced by Urquhart. In 1928, Urquhart became Principal of the College, and started a two-year term as Vice-Chancellor of Calcutta.

Urquhart founded the Philosophical Society at Scottish Church College and established links with the Indian YMCA. He regularly preached at services in Calcutta. He a member of the Congress of the Universities of the Empire from 1921. His works had a critic in C. D. Broad, who called them "veiled propaganda for Christianity".

== Later life ==
In 1937 Urquhart left Calcutta. Cornwallis Square, on which the Scottish Church College stood, was renamed Urquhart Square in his honour.

Urquhart taught at the University of Aberdeen for one year, then at Knox College, University of Toronto for 1938–9, and returned to Aberdeen. He was Croall Lecturer in 1939, and Wilde Lecturer at Oxford 1942–5; he gave the Riddoch Lecture at Aberdeen in 1942 and 1944.

Urquhart spent his retirement in Scotland, and died at Torphins, Aberdeenshire, on 16 July 1964.

== Works ==
- Pantheism and the Values of Life (1919), based on Urquhart's 1916 D.Phil. dissertation at Aberdeen.
- The Upanishads and Life
- The Historical and the Eternal Christ
- Theosophy and Christian Thought
- The Vedanta and Modern Thought (Edinburgh 1928)
- The Idea of Progress in Eastern and Western Thought (Calcutta 1931)
- Humanism and Christianity (Edinburgh 1945), Croall Lectures

== Family ==
On 20 December 1905, Urquhart married Margaret Macaskill, a missionary in Calcutta, the daughter of the Rev. Murdoch Macaskill. She published in 1925 Women of Bengal – A Study of the Hindu Pardanasins of Calcutta, including some discussion of the feminist movement in India; and Amiya, a Bengali Girl (juvenile literature, 1930). William and Margaret wrote together Alexander Tomory: Indian missionary (1910), a memorial for Alexander Tomory, Principal of the Scottish Church College who died that year.

== Bibliography ==
- Urquhart, Judy (2022). Dr. William Spence Urquhart - an account of his life by his great niece. Judy Urquhart. ISBN 979-8842864652.
