= Govinda Krishna Chettur =

Indian poet (1898–1936)

Govinda Krishna Chettur (1898–1936) was an Indian poet writing in English. Chettur served as Principal, Government College, Mangalore.

== Life ==
Govinda Krishna Chettur was born in British India on 24 April 1898. His father P. K. Chettur was a government official, and C. Sankaran Nair was an uncle. He was the oldest of four brothers: one younger brother, K. K. Chettur, became Indian ambassador to Japan and Belgium, and another, S. K. Chettur, held a high position in the Diplomatic Service. Govinda Krishna Chettur was educated at St Bede's High School, Madras, before gaining a BA from Madras Christian College. C. Sankaran Nair provided financial assistance for him to study at New College, Oxford, from 1918 to 1921. In Oxford he came to know English poets like W. B. Yeats, Arthur Symons, and John Masefield. In Hilary term 1920 he was President of the Oxford Majlis.

On returning to India Chettur was appointed Principal of Government College, Mangalore in 1922. In 1925 he married Subhadra Chettur, the youngest daughter of Appu Nedungadi. He founded and edited A Government College Miscellany, a college literary and artistic magazine.

In 1936 the British government recommended Chettur for the post of Director General of Public Instruction, but he died of stomach cancer on 1 March 1936, before being able to take up the post.

As a tribute to his vision and zeal in giving a shape to the Government College, where he worked as the Principal for fourteen years (1922–1936), University College, Mangalore (formerly Government College Mangalore) has brought out a volume of his selected writings in 2020 during its sesquicentennial celebration. The volume is titled A Journey: The selected Writings of Govinda Krishna Chettur: Excerpts from Government College Miscellany. The volume is edited by Dr. N.K. Rajalakshmi with a Foreword by Prof. C.N. Ramachandran.

== Works ==
- Sounds and Images: poems. London: Erskine Macdonald, 1921.
- The Temple Tank: and other poems. Mangalore: Basel Mission Book Shop, 1932.
- The Ghost City. Mangalore: Basel Mission Bookshop, 1932. A collection of ten short stories.
- The Triumph of Love: a sonnet-sequence. Mangalore, India: Basel Mission Bookshop, 1932.
- Gumataraya, and other sonnets for all moods. Mangalore: Basel Mission Bookshop, 1932.
- College Composition. Mangalore: Basel Mission Bookshop, 1933. Textbook.
- The Last Enchantment: Recollections of Oxford. Mangalore: B.M. Bookshop, 1934.
- The Shadow of God: a sonnet-sequence. London, New York: Longmans, Green and Co., 1935.
- (ed.) Altars of Silence: Themes for Meditation and Prayer. Mangalore Students' Stationery Society, 1935.
- A Journey: The selected Writings of Govinda Krishna Chettur: Excerpts from Government College Miscellany (2020) edited by Dr. N.K. Rajalakshmi
