= List of monuments in Palpa, Nepal =

This is a list of monuments in Palpa District, Nepal as officially recognized by and available through the website of the Department of Archaeology, Nepal. Palpa is a district of Lumbini Province and is located in western Nepal.

== List of monuments ==
ID	Name	Type	Location	District	Coordinates	Image
NP-PP-01	Rudrapurgadhi			Palpa		Upload Photo Upload Photo
NP-PP-02	Rishi Keshav Temple			Palpa	27°56′14″N 83°25′56″E	Rishi Keshav Temple Upload Photo
NP-PP-03	Temple of Amarnarayan			Palpa	27°52′02″N 83°32′52″E	Temple of Amarnarayan Upload Photo
NP-PP-04	Bhairav Temple			Palpa	27°52′08″N 83°28′47″E	Bhairav Temple Upload Photo
NP-PP-05	Temple of Vanshagopal			Palpa	27°50′33″N 83°32′20″E	Upload Photo Upload Photo
NP-PP-06	Bhagawati Temple			Palpa	27°52′04″N 83°32′39″E	Bhagawati Temple Upload Photo
NP-PP-07	Ganesh Temple			Palpa	27°52′14″N 83°32′41″E	Ganesh Temple Upload Photo
NP-PP-08	Shiva Temple			Palpa		Upload Photo Upload Photo
NP-PP-09	Ranighat Darbar			Palpa	27°55′35″N 83°31′32″E	Ranighat Darbar Upload Photo
NP-PP-10	Tansen Durbar			Palpa	27°52′03″N 83°32′34″E	Tansen Durbar Upload Photo
NP-PP-11	Sital Pati			Palpa	27°52′05″N 83°32′44″E	Sital Pati Upload Photo
NP-PP-12	Mandavya Rishi Temple			Palpa	27°49′31″N 83°34′03″E	Mandavya Rishi Temple Upload Photo

== See also ==
- List of monuments in Lumbini Province
- List of monuments in Nepal
