= Tansen (disambiguation) =

Tansen (c. 1500–1586) was a figure of Hindustani classical music.

Tansen may also refer to:

- Tansen (film), a 1943 Indian film about the musician
- Sangeet Samrat Tansen, a 1962 Indian film about the musician
- Tansen Samaroh, festival in India dedicated to the musician
- Tansen Pande (1910–1966), prominent Dhrupad singer
- Tansen, Nepal, place in Palpa District of Nepal
  - Tansen Durbar, building
