= Rana Ujeshwori Bhagwati temple =

Hindu temple in Nepal

- रण उजेश्वरी भगवती मन्दिर
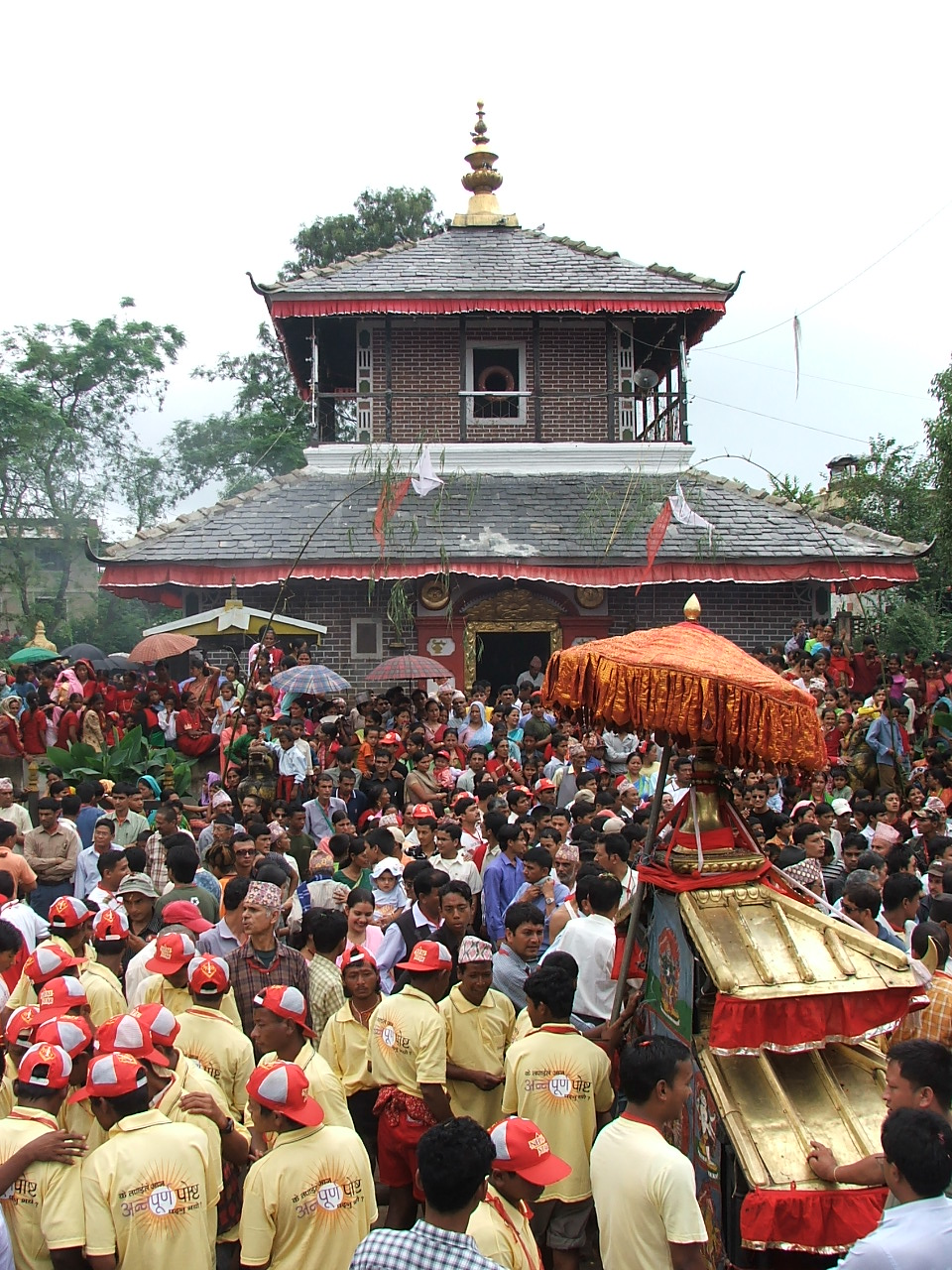
- Rana Ujeshwori Bhagwati temple

- Location in Nepal

Religion
- Affiliation: Hinduism
- District: Palpa
- Deity: Bhagwati
- Festival: Dashain

Location
- Location: Bhairabsthan
- Country: Nepal
- Interactive map of Rana Ujeshwori Bhagwati temple
- Coordinates: 27.868°N 83.544°E

The Rana Ujeshwori Bhagwati temple is located inside the Tansen Durbar square in Palpa district of Nepal. The temple was built by Ujir Singh Thapa as an offering to Goddess Bhagwati on the occasion of victory by Nepal Army over British Raj in Anglo-Nepali War (1872 BS).

The temple was destroyed by the earthquake of 1990 BS and was renovated by Pratap Shamsher Jung Bahadur Rana.

== Bhagwati Jatra ==
A festival called Bhagwati Jatra (also called Sindoor Jatra) is celebrated every year on the next day of Krishna Janmastami. This festival has been celebrated since 1877 BS.

== See also ==
- Bhairabsthan Temple
- List of Hindu temples in Nepal
