= Chidipani =

Chidipani चिदीपानी
- Village development committee

- Location in Nepal
- Coordinates: 27.84°N 83.63°E
- Country: Nepal
- Zone: Lumbini Zone
- District: Palpa District

Population (1991)
  - Total: 4,903
- Time zone: UTC+5:45 (Nepal Time)

Chidipani is a village in Palpa District in the Lumbini Zone of southern Nepal. At the time of the 1991 Nepal census it had a population of 4903 people living in 891 individual households.

Chidipani is located 21 kilometers east of Tansen, the district seat and is 5 km away from Arya Bhanjyang.

Mul Dhoka and Durbar were heavily destroyed by Maoists during their revolt.
