= Satchit Rana =

Nepali army general

General Satchit Shamsher Jung Bahadur Rana OGDB OTSP OBE BVO
- महारथी श्री स‌‌‌‍त्चित शम्शेर जङ्गबहादुर राणा
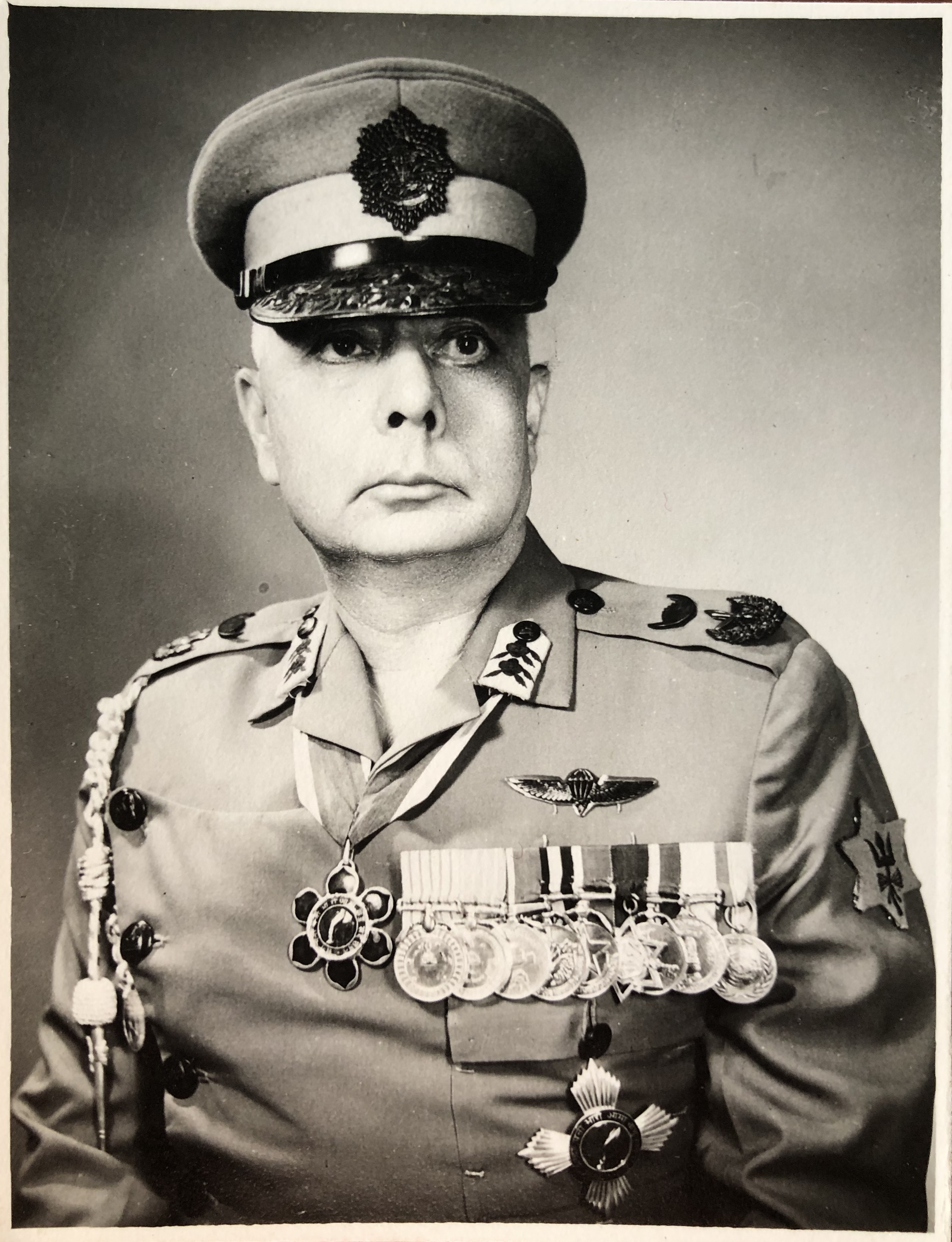
- Born: 15 January 1934; Tansen Durbar, Lumbini
- Died: 4 May 2007 (aged 73); Shree Birendra Military Hospital, Kathmandu
- Alma mater: Banaras Hindu University; Royal Military Academy, Sandhurst; Führungsakademie der Bundeswehr
- Spouse: Rani Asha Rana
- Relatives: Bir Shumsher Jang Bahadur Rana (Great-Grandfather)
- Military career
- Allegiance: Kingdom of Nepal
- Branch: Royal Nepalese Army
- Service years: 1955–1991
- Rank: General
- Units: Infantry; Paratrooper
- Commands: No.1 Home Guard, Barda Bahadur Battalion; Para Rifle Company; Royal Nepalese Military Academy, Kharipati; Chief Operations Officer, UNIFL; 1st Infantry Brigade; 2nd Infantry Brigade; Royal Nepalese Army
- Conflicts: Khampa Disarming Operation; Lebanese Civil War
- Awards: Order of Tri Shakti Patta; Order of Gorkha Dakshina Bahu; Kirtimaya Nepal Shreepad; Cross of Merit; Grand Cross; United Nations Medal; Order of the British Empire
- Other work: Ambassador to Myanmar

Satchit Shamsher Jung Bahadur Rana (15 January 1934 – 4 May 2007) was the 34th Chief of Army Staff of the Royal Nepalese Army. He was a member of the Rana Dynasty of Nepal.

== Early life ==
Rana was born in Tansen Durbar, Lumbini Zone, to Lieutenant General Madhav Shamsher J.B. Rana and Rani Madhavi Kumari Rana. Lt General Madhav Rana was the Governor of Dhankuta during the Rana Dynasty. He was the fourth son. Rana had four brothers (three elder and one younger) and three sisters (two elder and one younger).

Rana belonged to a family with a history in military command and statesmanship. His paternal grandfather, Maharaj Kumar Commanding General Pratap Shamsher J.B. Rana, had been the Governor of Palpa (1924–1929) as well as the Commanding General of Northern Nepal (1932–1934). His paternal great-grandfather, Commanding General Maharaja Sir Bir Shumsher J.B. Rana, had been the 11th Prime Minister of Nepal and the Maharaja of Lamjung and Kaski (1885–1901).

Rana completed most of his further education in India. He passed the admission examination of the Benares Hindu University in 1949. He was awarded his Intermediate of Arts Degree in 1951. He then began pursuing a BA degree at BHU but dropped out in the last year due to his successful results in the Officer Cadre Selection Examination for the Royal Nepalese Army.

== Military career ==
=== Junior officer ===
After his selection, he chose the Royal Military Academy Sandhurst to undertake his military training in 1953. He completed his training and was commissioned into the Royal Nepalese Army in the rank of second lieutenant on 22 July 1955. At the time, the then Lieutenant Rana was the second officer in the Royal Nepalese Army to have received training from Sandhurst.

In his first posting, he was assigned to the Shree Shreenath Battalion. During this posting, he was appointed the Joint Team Leader of the Nepal-China Border Team. The objective of the team was to resolve the border disputes taking place at the time. The work undertaken by the team contributed to the official border agreement between Nepal and China signed in 1961. After being promoted to captain in 1962, he underwent further training at the Nepalese Military Academy which at that time was based in Nagarkot. He was then assigned to the No.1 Home Guard of the Barda Bahadur Battalion. During this period, he was promoted to Assistant Battalion Commander and afterwards, Acting Battalion Commander.

=== Staff College and Para Rifle Company ===
In 1965, he left for Staff College training to Germany to join the Führungsakademie der Bundeswehr in Hamburg. After spending a year in Hamburg, Rana returned to Nepal. Upon his return, he was promoted to major and was deputed to the Army Headquarters.

In 1970, he was transferred to the Para Rifle Company. Immediately after his transfer, he was promoted to lieutenant colonel. A year after this, he took overall command of the Para unit as well as the Para Training Academy. He was associated with the Para unit for eleven years. At the start of his tenure, he completed his parachuting training course which was facilitated by the instructors of the Israel Defense Force.

=== Khampa Disarmament Operation ===
By the early 1970s about nine thousand Khampa fighters, Tibetan tribesmen resisting Chinese authority, had crossed over the border to the remote Nepalese district of Mustang. Here they established military camps from where they would launch attacks into the Chinese Autonomous Region of Tibet. In addition to carrying out illegal military activity, the Khampa fighters had been pillaging, plundering and killing members of the local communities. Consequently, a joint agreement between the Nepalese and Chinese governments was signed, with the common objective of disarming the Khampa fighters.

A brigade size task-force was organised with the objective of disarming the Khampa fighters in 1974. Before the deployment of the entire taskforce, the then Lieutenant Colonel Rana led a small reconnaissance team to gather military intelligence in order to formulate the procedure of disarmament. After having identified the locations of various military camps, gauged their military capabilities and identified the leaders of the Khampa fighters, Rana devised the plan of operations. The taskforce was deployed towards Mustang on 15 July 1974. The main battle group of the task force was based around the Shree Shreenath Battalion, which was under the command of Rana. Consequently, Rana was given the leadership of the ground operations.

After having received multiple false promises of disarmament from Gey-Wangdi, the commander of the Khampa forces, military units under the command of Rana moved in to occupy the camps on 1 August. Whilst Rana was able to dismantle all the camps, recover large quantities of weaponry and capture a number of Khampa fighters, Gey-Wangdi was able to escape. Wangdi was eventually killed in a fire fight in mid-September. Rana was awarded the Kirtimaya Nepal Shreepad for "his effective planning, efficient execution and distinguished field command during the operation".

=== Royal Nepalese Military Academy Kharipati ===
After the completion of the Khampa Operation, Rana was promoted to the rank of colonel in May, 1975. He was then appointed as the Commandant of the Royal Nepalese Military Academy, Kharipati. During his tenure as commandant, he tried to re-calibrate the syllabi of the academy to focus on mountain warfare. He also took the initiative to undertake research in order to solve the logistical problems related to mountain warfare.

=== United Nations Interim Force in Lebanon ===
In 1978, the Royal Nepalese Army deputed Rana to work in the headquarters of the United Nations Interim Force in Lebanon as Chief Operations Officer. The UNIFL had been set up by the United Nations in response to the South Lebanon conflict which took place the same year. Rana's tenure as COO saw the Tyre District, a designated UN area, being infiltrated and occupied by eighty Palestine Liberation Organization fighters. This destabilised the military and political situation, as Israel had only recently withdrawn troops from Lebanon on the condition that the PLO would follow suit.

Rana responded by placing various peacekeeping units in positions around the Tyre District and surrounding the infiltrators. Consequently, he made their position strategically untenable and forced them into negotiations. He personally led the negotiations with the PLO fighters and their leaders, including Yasser Arafat, who were based in the surrounding regions. After one and a half months, Rana ensured their withdrawal without the need for military confrontation.

During his time as COO, he developed a close rapport with the then Secretary General of the UN Kurt Waldheim. Throughout the Tyre District confrontation, he was in correspondence with Waldheim, discussing and formulating peacekeeping plans with him. When they met in person at the UN Headquarters in New York, Waldheim offered Rana a tenure extension in lieu of his effective leadership of the UNIFL. However, Rana declined due to his prior professional commitments to the Royal Nepalese Army.

=== 1979 student protests and Director of Military Operations ===
Rana returned to Nepal in 1979. Whilst he had been in Lebanon, Rana had been promoted to the rank of brigadier general. Upon his return, he was appointed commander of the 1st Infantry Brigade. His tenure as commander witnessed the 1979 Nepalese Student Protests. The main objective of the protestors was to gain democratic freedom. The Brigade was based in Kathmandu when the protests began. Rana was involved in the minimisation of violence and vandalism which was being carried out by certain reactionary groups of the protest. The protests came to an end after King Birendra announced a referendum. Following the election, the electorate chose to continue with monarchical panchayat system. Afterwards, Rana commanded the 2nd Infantry Brigade in 1980.

Rana was promoted to the rank of major general in 1982. Along with this promotion, he was also appointed as the Director General of Military Operations. In this capacity, he supervised the planning and execution of all military operations undertaken by the Army.

=== Chief of Army Staff ===
On 15 May 1987, Rana was appointed as the Chief of Army Staff. During his tenure as COAS, which lasted four years, he planned and executed multiple military and civil missions. During the Third SAARC Summit held in November 1987, as COAS he was in-charge of the overall security, logistics and administration. In 1988, an earthquake of magnitude 6.5 struck eastern Nepal along its border with the Indian state of Bihar. 252 people perished, more than a thousand were injured and thousands of houses collapsed due to the earthquake. Rana was responsible for coordinating search and rescue operations. He also carried out the implementation of rehabilitation programmes.

In late ‘89 and early ‘90, protests broke out in Kathmandu and in other parts of Nepal in support of a multi-party democratic system. Initially, Rana after discussions with King Birendra, did not want to take military action against the protestors. Consequently, the Army was not deployed. However, on 6 April 1990, the protests turned violent. A number of protestors began to vandalise and carry out acts of arson. Such violence was concentrated around the Tundikhel and New Road area. In an effort to deescalate the situation, Rana ordered units of the Army to move into the centre of Kathmandu. To avoid further such violence, a curfew was put in place in the Kathmandu Valley.

On 9 April, King Birendra allowed for the establishment of a multi-party democratic system and the creation of a new constitution. In the new system of governance, King Birendra became a constitutional monarch with a large amount of political power transferring to the elected representatives. During the drafting of the new constitution, Rana provided suggestions to the then Prime Minister and Defence Minister Krishna Prasad Bhattarai. Rana advocated that the new constitution should continue to keep the King as the Supreme Commander of the Army. He believed that this would allow the armed forces to maintain its political neutrality and professional proficiency. When the new constitution was implemented in November 1990, the King remained the supreme commander of the Army. However, any military action to be undertaken had to now be discussed in the National Defence Council. This council consisted of the King, the elected Prime Minister and the Chief of Army Staff.

During his tenure, he aided in the establishment of the Shree Birendra Army Hospital in the Chauni District of Kathmandu and the Birendra Sainik Awasiya Mahavidyalaya in Bhaktapur. Additionally, he undertook official visits in the capacity of COAS to the United Kingdom and Bangladesh. On 15 May 1991, Rana retired from his position after having commanded the army for four years. His retirement marked the end of a thirty-six year-long military career.

== Post military career ==
Upon his retirement, Rana was appointed by King Birendra as an Honourable Member of the Royal Council. In 1995, during the 50th Birthday Celebrations of King Birendra, Rana was appointed the Vice Chairman and Treasurer of the Golden Jubilee Birthday Ceremony Committee. In June 1996, he was appointed as the Royal Ambassador to Myanmar, Vietnam, and Laos. During his ambassadorship, Rana worked to enhance the relationship between Nepal and Myanmar. During this period, Myanmar supported Nepal's application for membership in the BIMSTEC. In 1998, Nepal became an observer member of BIMSTEC. Rana served as ambassador till 1999 after which he returned to Nepal.

After his return, Rana was regularly called upon by the government to give his opinion on security matters. With the escalation of the Maoist Insurgency in Nepal, King Gyanendra appointed Rana as a Rt. Honourable Member of the Privy Council Standing Committee. During this period, Rana was critical of the Maoist forces and their methods of engagement. Consequently, he was considered a target by the Maoist insurgents. A resort owned by Rana was attacked by Maoist insurgents in September 2003. In August 2005, Rana's residence in Kathmandu was bombed by the Maoists. In both terror attacks, there were no fatalities. In 2005, when the Seven Party Alliance and 12 Point Agreement was carried out, Rana considered these alliances to be unnatural. According to him, democratic parties negotiating with an insurgency group undermined the interests of the state. Rana believed that in trying to gain political power, the democratic parties had compromised on national interests.

Rana succumbed to cancer on 4 May 2007. He is survived by his wife and four children.

== Personal life ==
Rana was married to Rani Asha Rana (née Shah). They had three daughters and one son:

- Mrs Satchida Rajya Laxmi Singh
- Mrs Saktida Rajya Laxmi Singh
- Captain Sadaya Shamsher Jung Bahadur Rana (Retd)
- Mrs Sukirti Rajya Laxmi Bhatta

In his retirement, Rana involved himself in agriculture and tourism. He established the Gurkha Hill Resort, which is still open in the Gorkha Municipal District, and began apple farming in Mangchet, Rasuwa District. He was also an avid golfer.

Military offices
Preceded by Arjun Narsingh Rana	Chief of Army Staff of the Royal Nepalese Army; 1987 – 1991	Succeeded by Gadul Shamsher JB Rana
