= Bhairabsthan =

Coordinates: 27°51′N 83°29′E

Tansen
- Village development committee
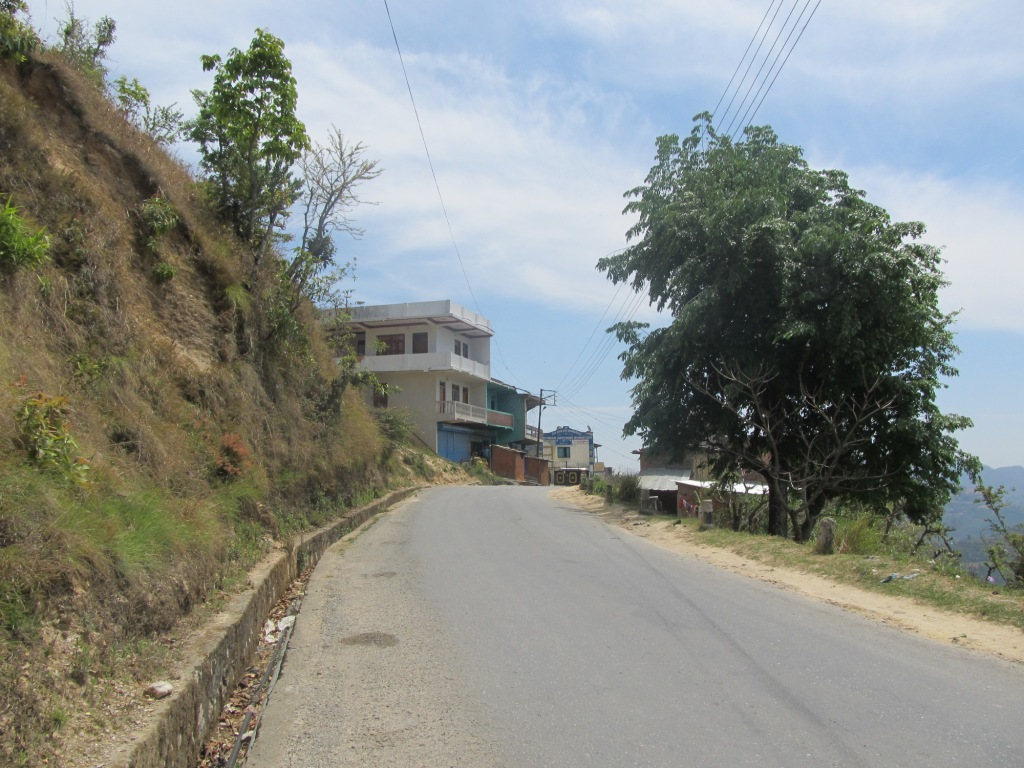
- Vairabshtan road, Bhairabsthan a part of NH48
- Interactive map of Tansen
- Country: Nepal
- Province: Lumbini Province
- District: Palpa District

Population (1991)
  - Total: 2,937
- Time zone: UTC+5:45 (Nepal Time)

Bhairabsthan is a village in Ripdikot Rural Municipality Ward No 4 in the Palpa District of the Lumbini Zone in southern Nepal. Bhairabsthan is 9 km away from the headquarters of Palpa District i.e. Tansen. According to the 1991 Nepal census, it had a population of 2937 people living in 544 individual households.

== History ==
The Bhuretakure kings are the rulers who were believed to have ruled the area where the temple is located.

== Tourist area ==
1. Bhairabsthan Temple
2. Mani Mukundasen Park
3. Bhimsen Temple
