= Tansen, Nepal =

Tānsen तानसेन
- Municipality; Hill station
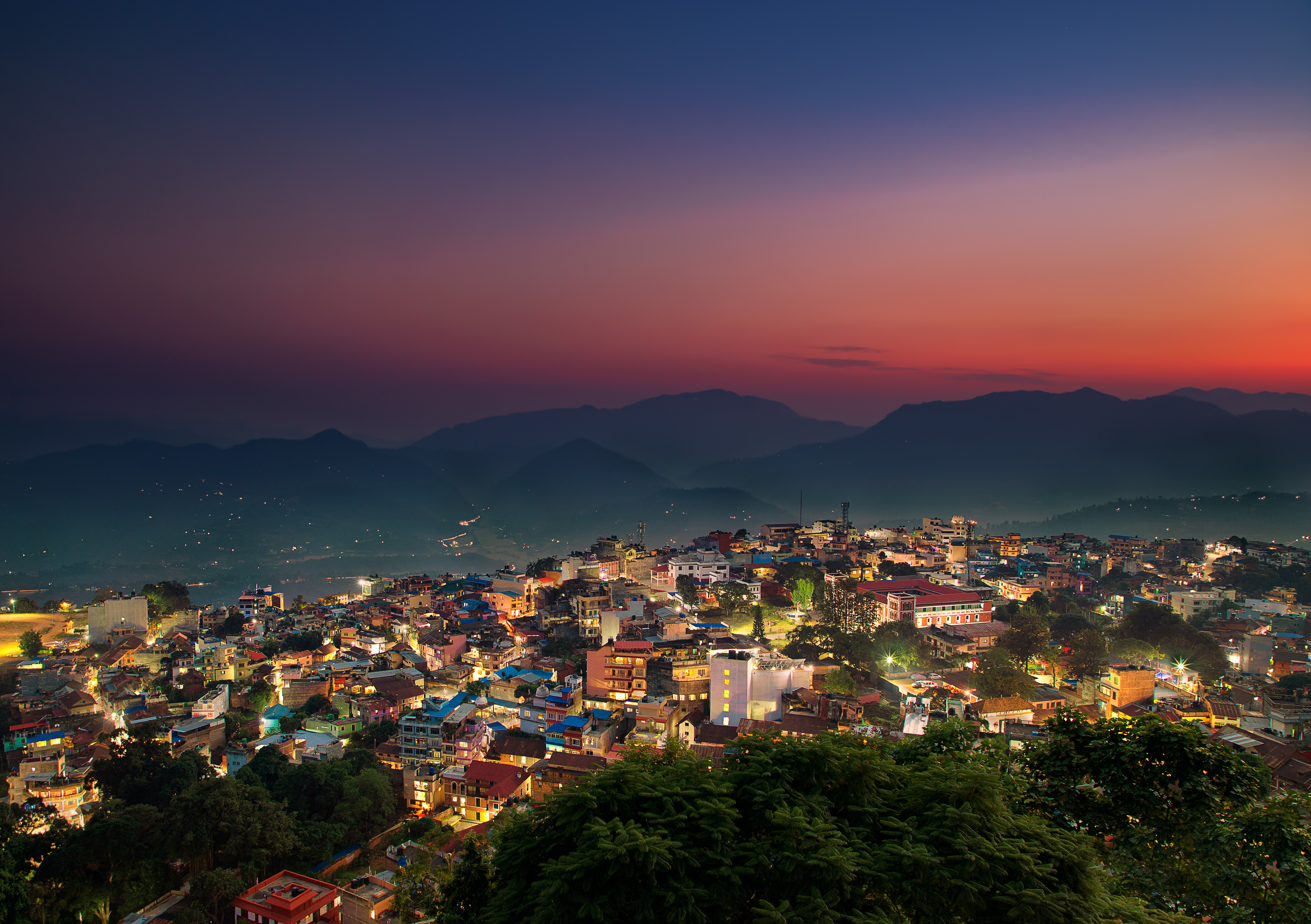
- Tansen

- Location in Nepal Tānsen (Nepal)
- Coordinates: 27°52′0″N 83°33′0″E
- Country: Nepal
- Province: Lumbini
- District: Palpa
- Municipality: Tansen

Government
  - Type: Mayor–council government
  - Mayor: Mr.Santosh Lal Shrestha
  - Deputy Mayor: Mrs. Pratichhya Sinjali
- Elevation: 1,350 m (4,430 ft)

Population (2011 Census)
  - Total: 31,095
- Time zone: UTC+5:45 (NST)
- Postal code: 32500
- Area code: 075
- Website: tansenmun.gov.np

Tansen is a municipality and the administrative center of Palpa District in the "hills" of central Nepal. It is located on the highway between Butwal and Pokhara, on the crest of the Mahabharat Range or Lesser Himalaya overlooking the valley of the Kaligandaki River to the north. The highway bypasses the town center on the west, protecting pedestrian amenities in the central maze of steep, narrow, winding alleys lined with Newari shophouses and temples.

== History ==
Tansen was the capital of the Magar Kingdom (Barha Magarat) in Palpa, one of the most powerful regional principalities before the rise of the Shah dynasty. It even came close to conquering Kathmandu in the 16th century under the leadership of Mukunda Sen. The Palpa district is home to the Magar people, and the name "Tansen" has its origins in the Magar language, meaning "northern settlement." Local Magar kings lost influence in the 18th century and Tansen became a Newari bazaar on the important trade route between India and Tibet via the Kaligandaki River and Mustang. Because it was a district administrative center of the Kingdom of Nepal, Maoists targeted Tansen several times during the Nepalese Civil War, including a major assault on the historic Durbar (palace) compound in 2006.

Nearby Srinagar Danda (hill) offers a panoramic view of the high Himalaya. From west to east, the Kanjiroba, Dhaulagiri, Annapurna, Mansiri, Ganesh and Langtang groups are in sight. Other nearby attractions include Ranighat, a Rana palace next to the Kaligandaki River, and Ridi Bazaar, a major Hindu pilgrimage destination at the auspicious confluence of the Kaligandaki and Ridi Rivers. A large mela is held there on Maghe Sankranti (about January 14).

Tansen is the home of United Mission Hospital, located one mile east of the town center. The hospital was established in 1954 as a partnership between the people of Nepal and a coalition of 20 Christian organizations on four continents. As of 2010, Mission Hospital has 160 beds, and the clinics there see over 100,000 patients per year. Mission Hospital is the oldest project of United Mission to Nepal (UMN), a consortium of eight worldwide Christian denominations that was formed in 1952 to coordinate missionary work in Nepal. Presently there are about a dozen expatriate medical personnel assisted by a staff of about 300 Nepalese. Mission Hospital collaborates with Tansen Nursing School, considered to be among the best training programs for basic nursing education in the country. The 2007 book, "The Hospital at the End of the World" describes the workings of Mission Hospital from the perspective of a short-term Medical Missionary.

== Climate ==
The town enjoys a moderate climate with temperatures rarely exceeding 30 °C (86 °F) or going below freezing.

Climate data for Tansen, elevation 1,067 m (3,501 ft)
Month	Jan	Feb	Mar	Apr	May	Jun	Jul	Aug	Sep	Oct	Nov	Dec	Year
Mean daily maximum °C (°F)	17.2 (63.0)	19.3 (66.7)	24.2 (75.6)	29.0 (84.2)	30.0 (86.0)	29.3 (84.7)	27.5 (81.5)	27.4 (81.3)	26.8 (80.2)	25.5 (77.9)	22.3 (72.1)	18.7 (65.7)	24.8 (76.6)
Mean daily minimum °C (°F)	4.4 (39.9)	5.8 (42.4)	9.7 (49.5)	15.4 (59.7)	18.2 (64.8)	19.9 (67.8)	20.2 (68.4)	19.9 (67.8)	18.7 (65.7)	15.8 (60.4)	9.0 (48.2)	4.9 (40.8)	13.5 (56.3)
Average precipitation mm (inches)	22.6 (0.89)	23.4 (0.92)	23.7 (0.93)	35.5 (1.40)	76.3 (3.00)	237.5 (9.35)	467.4 (18.40)	363.1 (14.30)	195.5 (7.70)	51.0 (2.01)	4.2 (0.17)	14.4 (0.57)	1,514.6 (59.64)
Source 1: Australian National University
Source 2: Japan International Cooperation Agency (precipitation)

== Economy ==
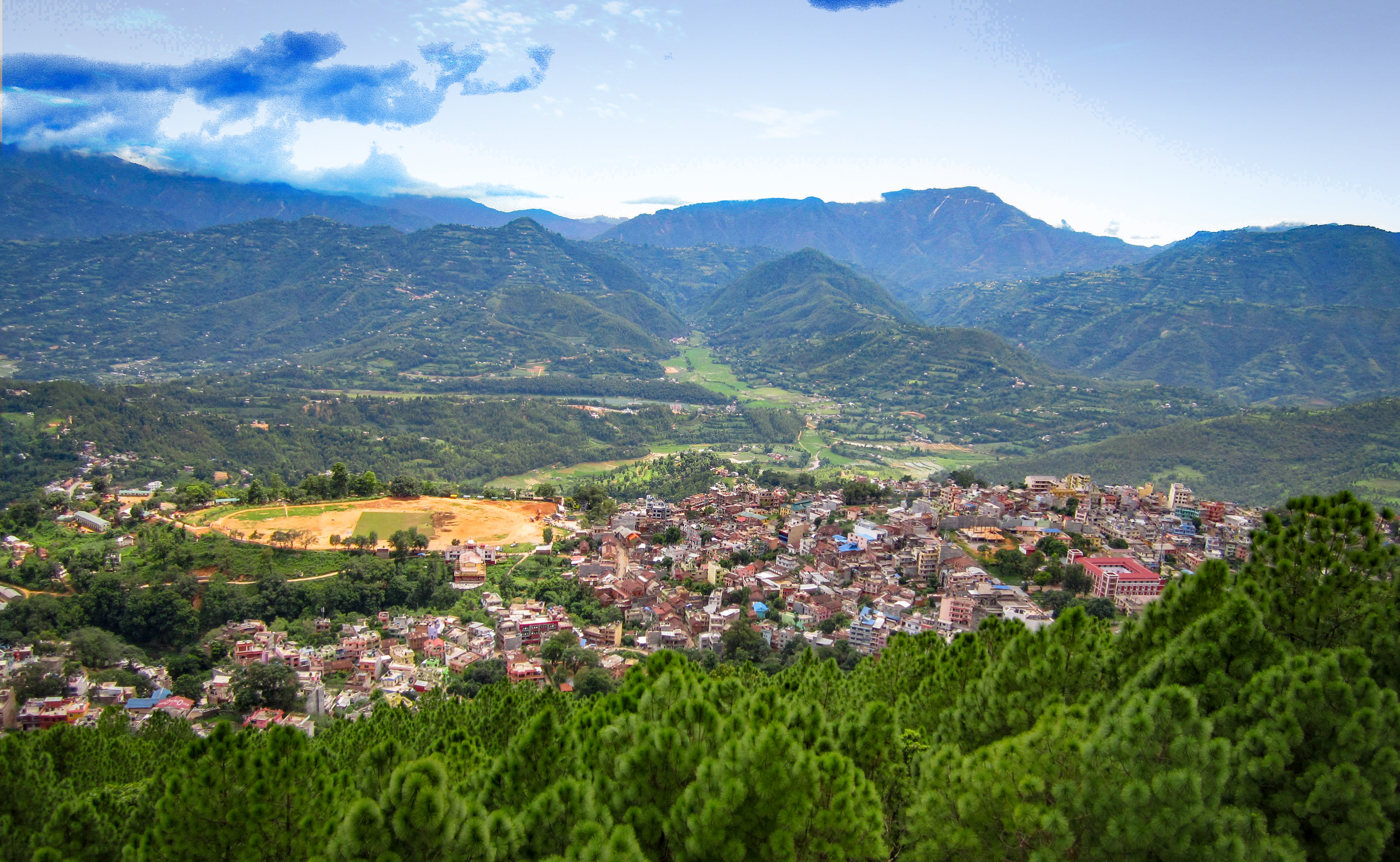
Tansen Skyline

Besides trade, local Newars are known for traditional metalwork and producing dhaka cloth used in traditional jackets and topis. The most important landmark is the octagonal pavilion "Golghar" in the middle of Sitalpati, the main market square.

== Sites of Interest (Tourism) ==
1. Tansen Durbar
2. Rani Mahal
3. Rambha Devi Temple
4. Shreenagar
5. Whitelake View
6. Symbolic Gate (Muldhoka)
7. Sitalpati
8. Budhha Stupa
9. Naran Temple
10. Bhagwati Temple
11. Bhairav Temple
12. Rishikeshv Temple
13. Guffa Dada Telgha
14. Dumre khola Dumre
15. Jantilung Masyam
16. Thulo chaupari Dumre
17. Tudikhel (Karuwa)
18. Jogipani bolani pani kuwa
19. Bhairabsthan Temple

== Sites of Interest (Religion) ==
1. Bhagwati Temple, Bhagawati Tole
2. Bhairav Temple, Bhairavsthan
3. Ganesh temple, Bhagawati Tole
4. Mahachaitya Bihar, Taksar Tole
5. Amar Narayan Temple, Narayansthan
6. Darlam Mahakali Temple, Darlamdanda
7. Shivalay Temple,
8. Mahamrityunjaya Shivasankar, Barangdi
9. Bagnaskot, Bagnas
10. Satyawati Lake
11. Rambhadevi Tahu
12. lipindevi temple, tansen 11samobari

== World Heritage Status ==
This site was added to the UNESCO World Heritage Tentative List on January 30, 2008 in the Cultural category.

== 2015 Nepal earthquake ==
The city was affected by an earthquake on 25 April 2015. The United Mission Hospital in Tansen was expected to receive many patients in the aftermath of the severe shaking in the town similar to earthquakes that occur in Japan. A presentation by missionaries was held on 6 May 2015 at the United Mission Hospital in Tansen to share their experiences during the earthquake.

== Gallery ==
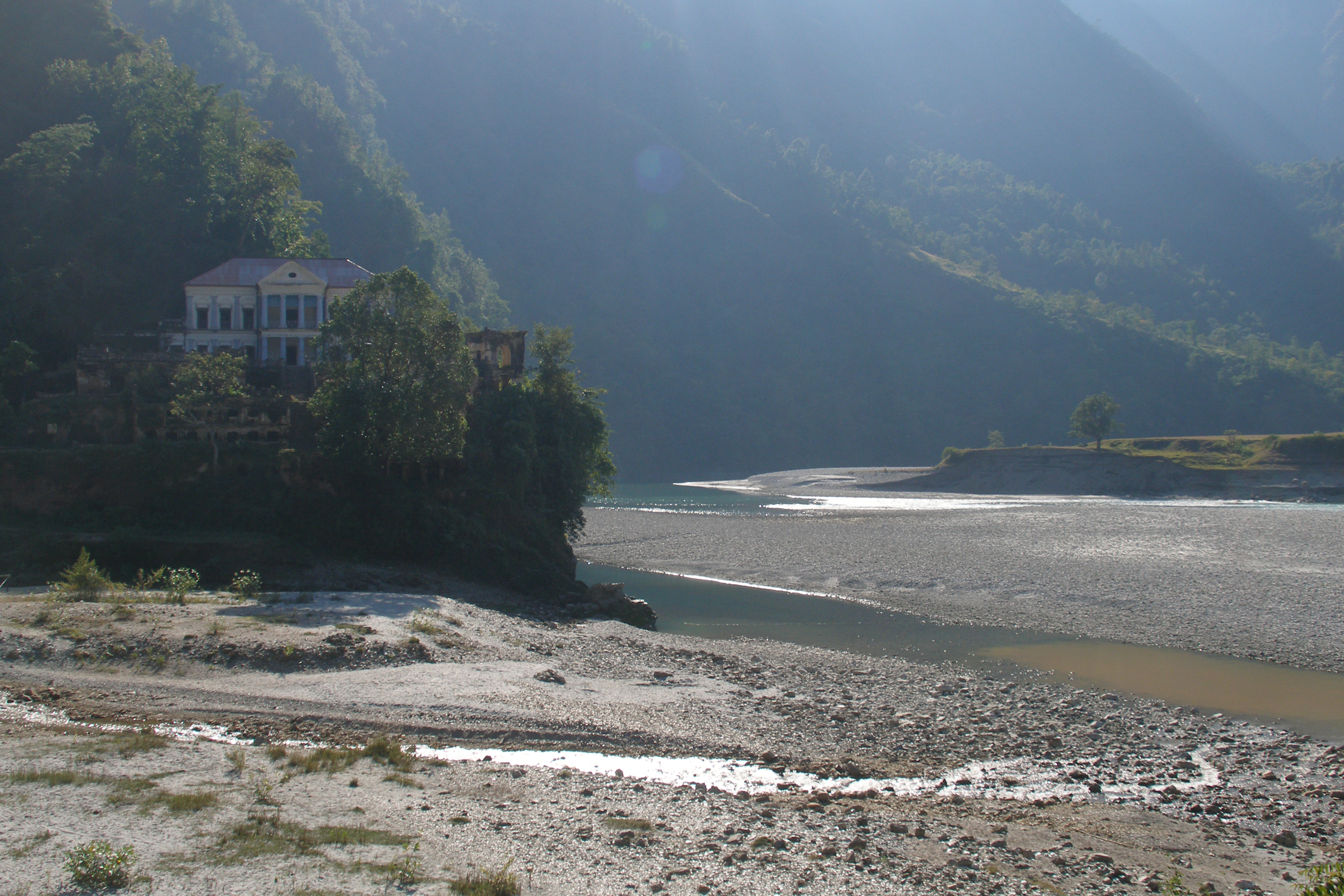
Ranighat Palace

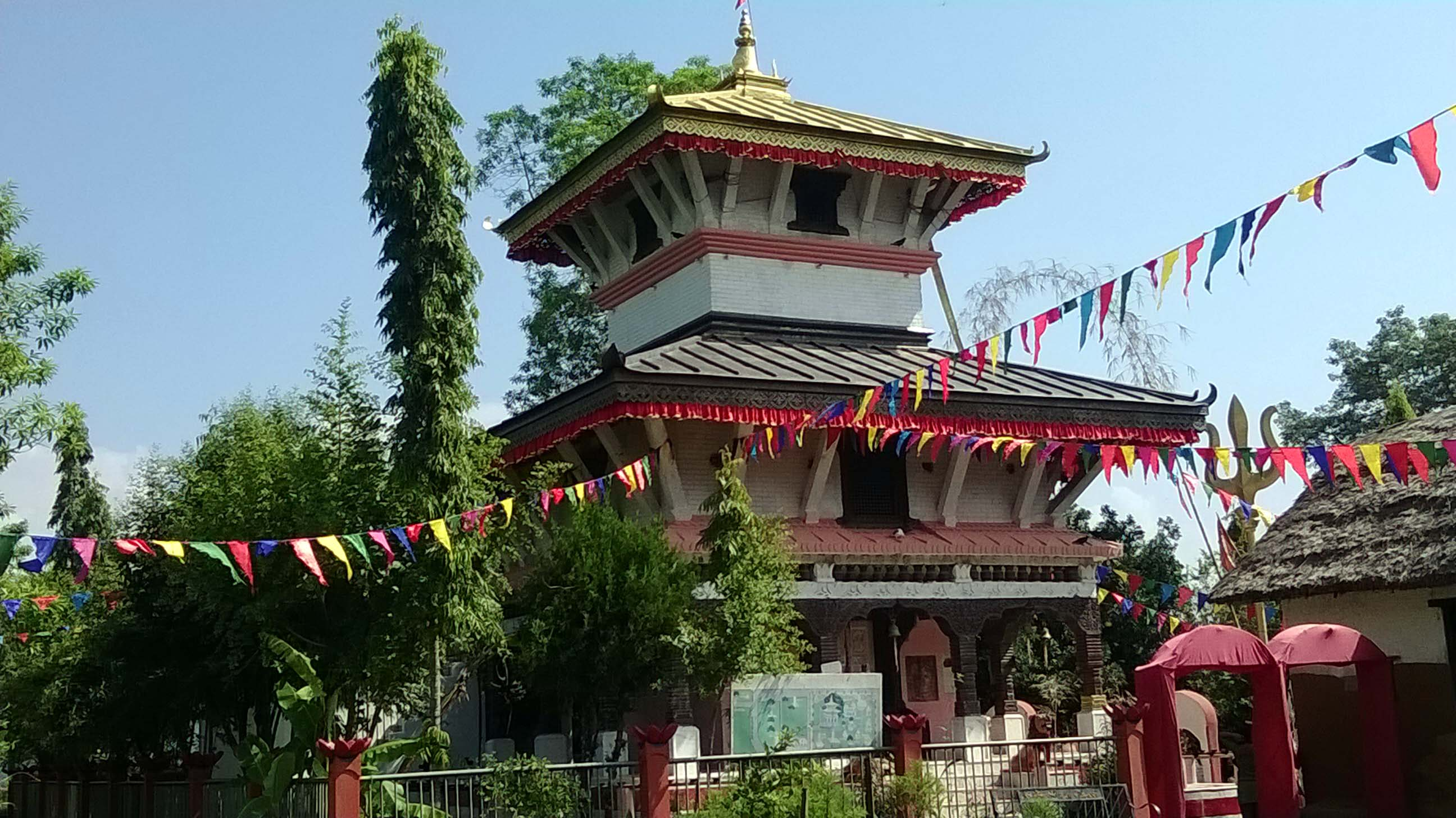
Hindu Temple situated north side of Palpa District

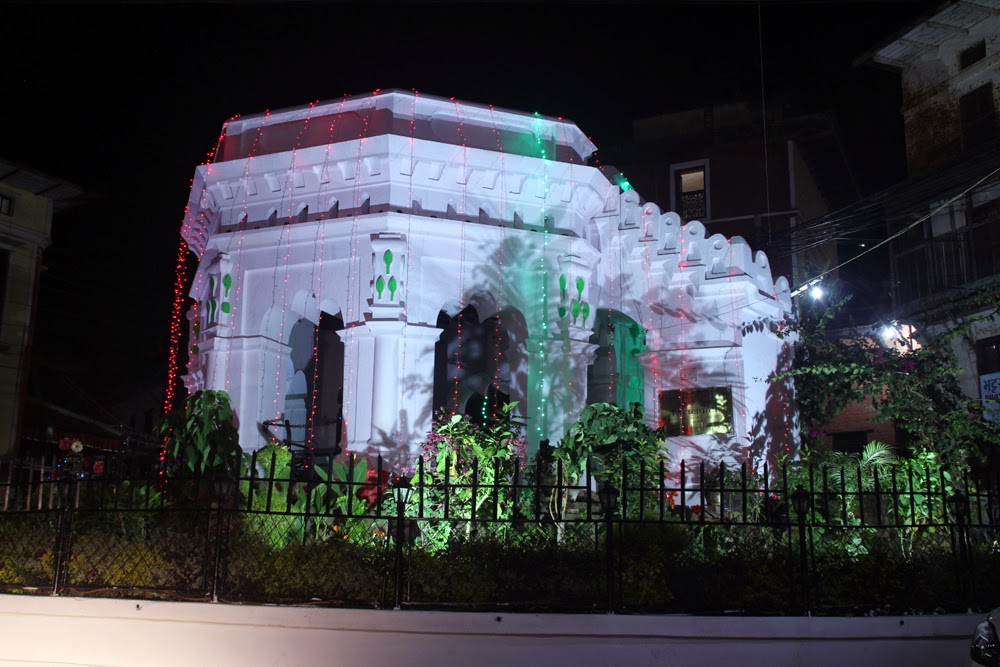
"Golghar" as the central monument in white, situated in the middle of Tansen, Palpa

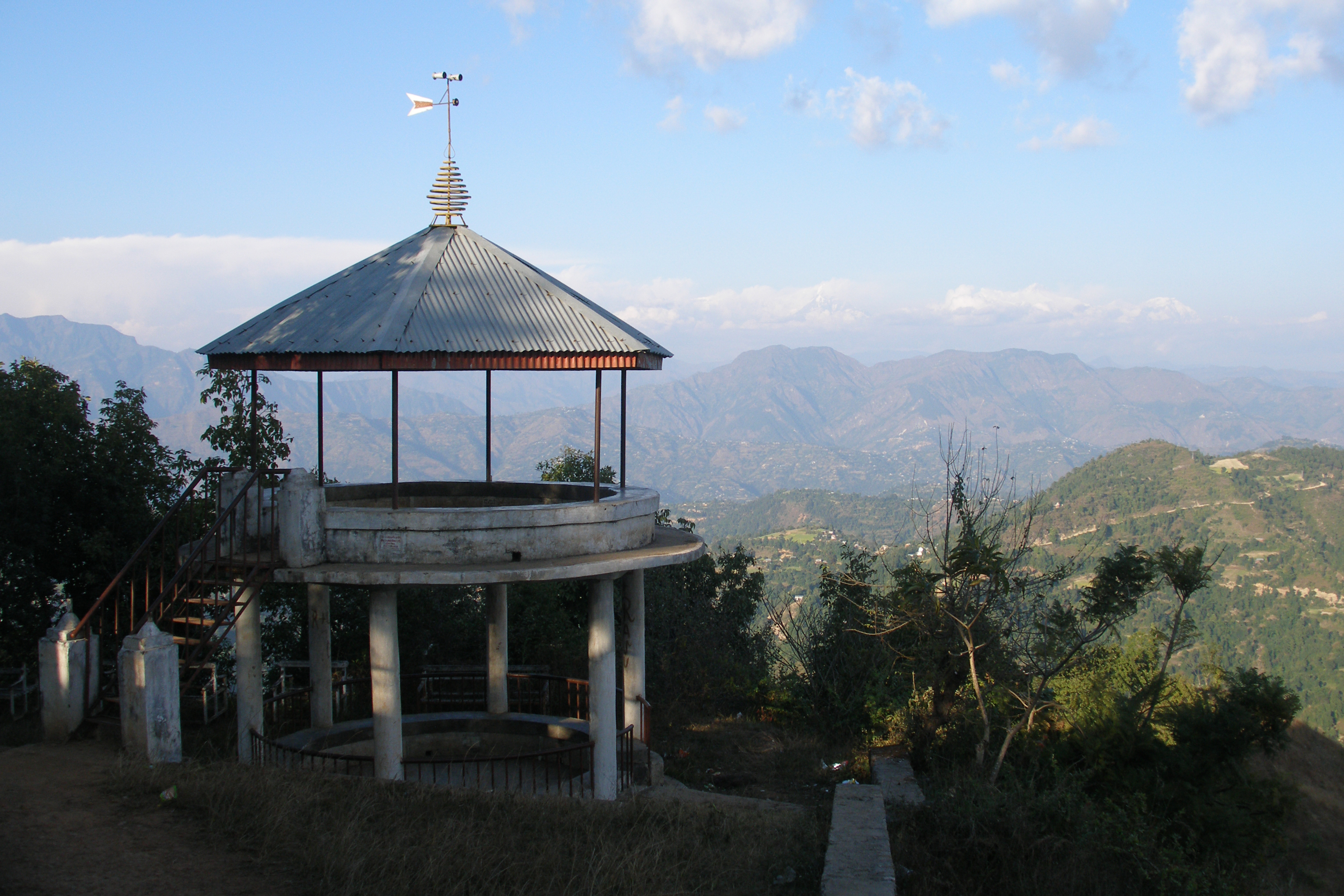

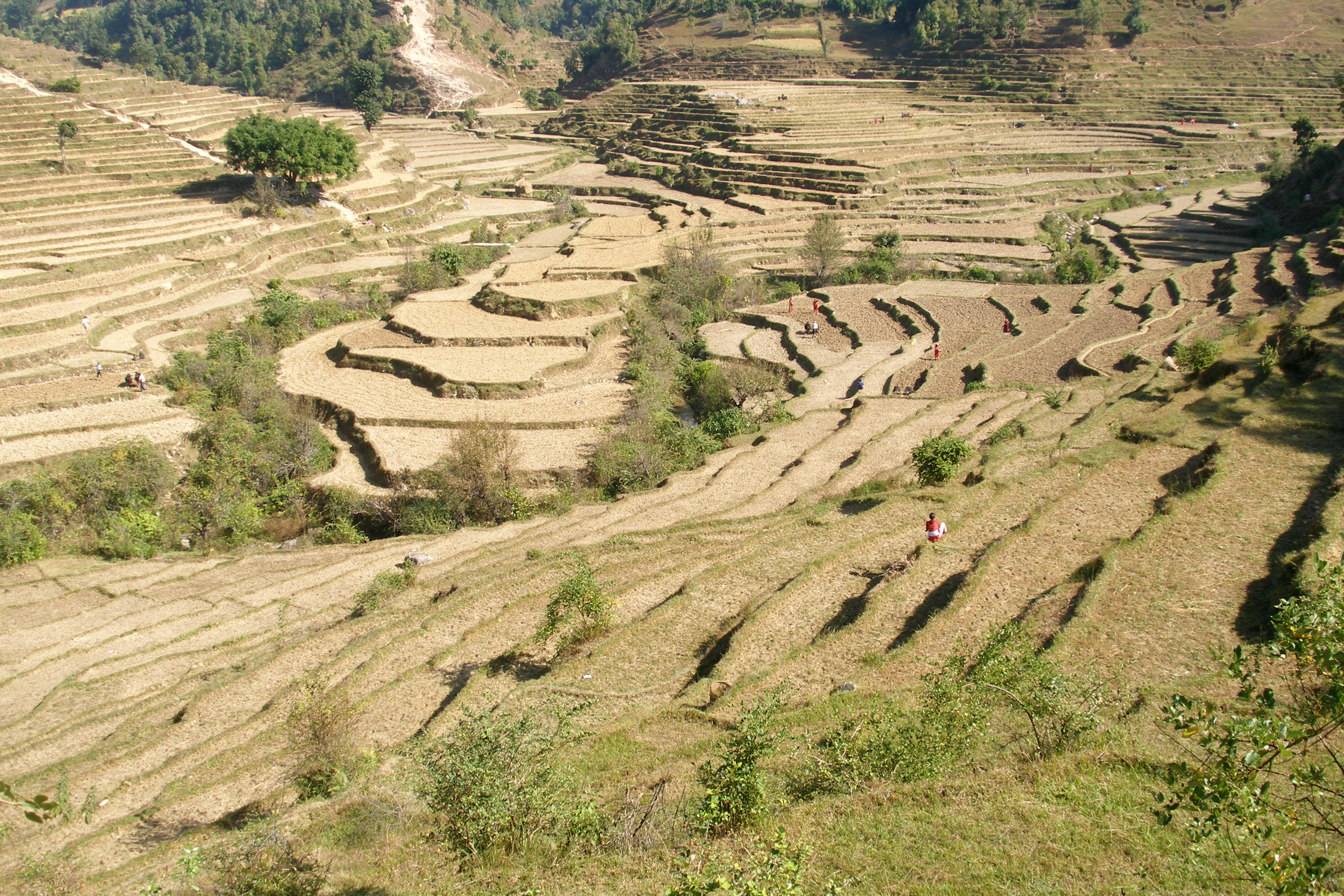
Rice paddies

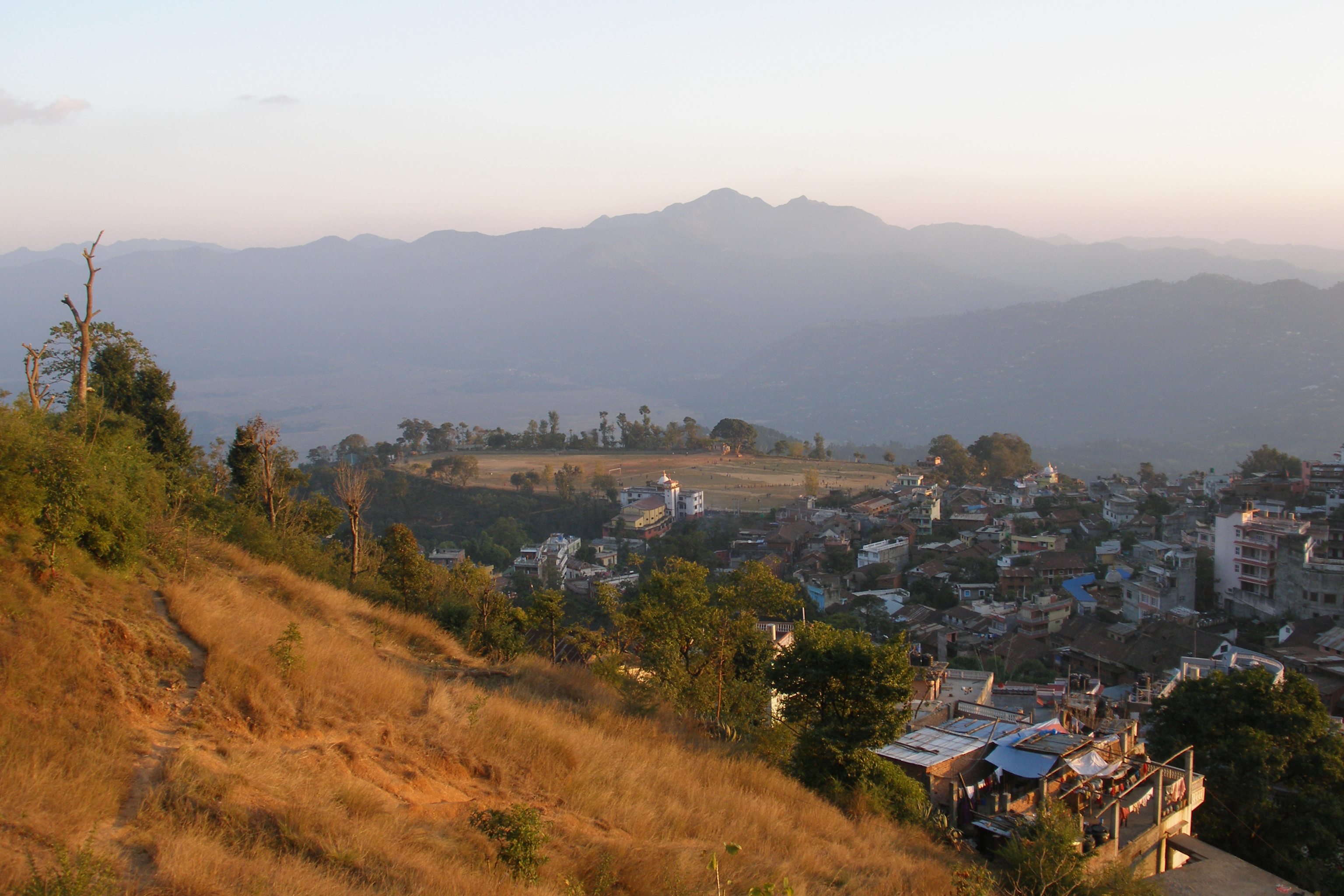
Tansen at sunset

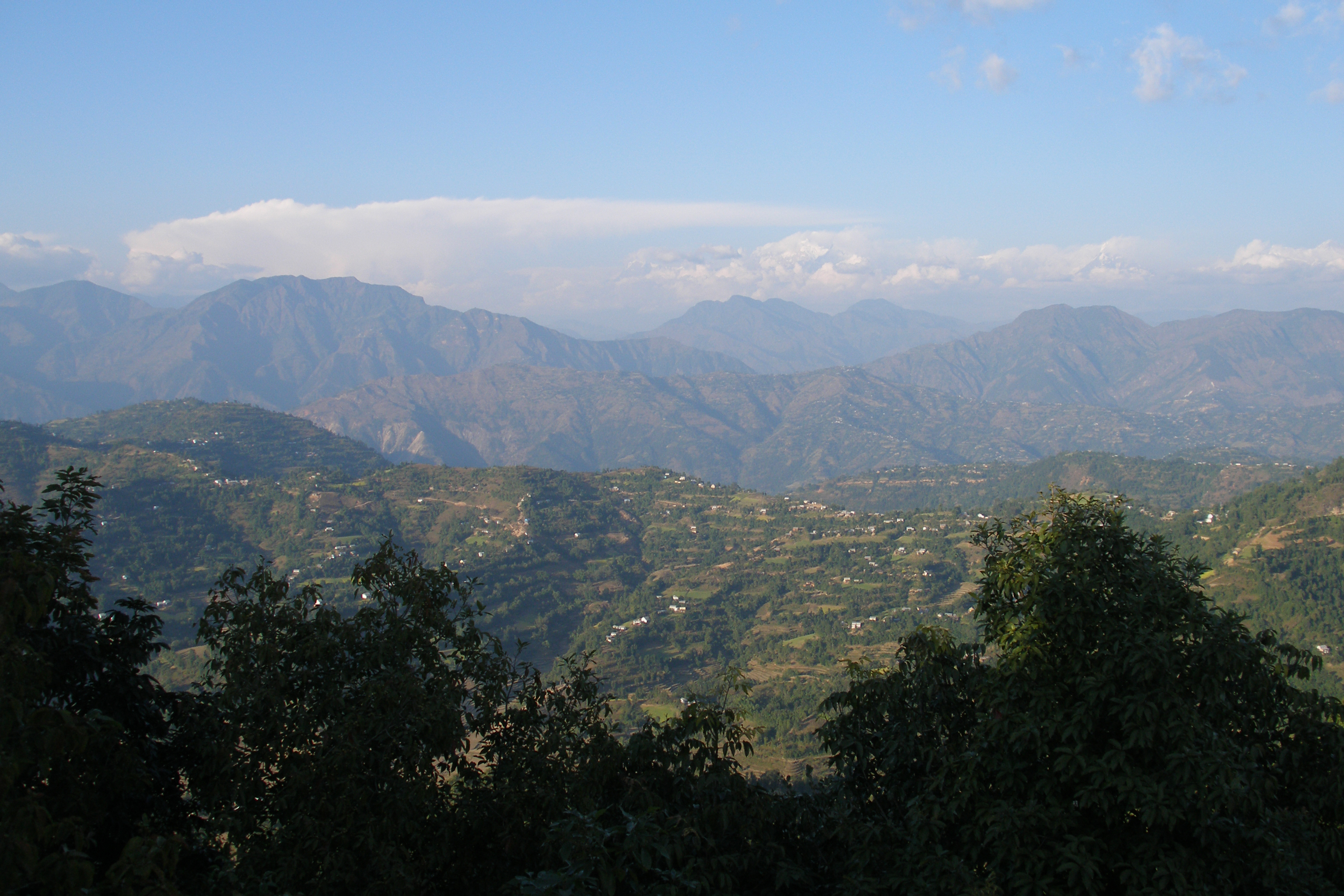
View of Lesser Himalaya Range

== Notable people from Tansen ==
- Kamal Rana, Politician
- Kumar Kashyap Mahasthavir, a Buddhist monk
- Raameshwor Shrestha, Singer and songwriter
- Rajesh Hamal, Nepali film actor
- Satchit Rana, staff of Nepal Army
- Shweta Punjali, Musician

== See also ==
- Tansen Durbar
