= Khampa Disarming Operation =

Military operation in Nepal

The Khampa Disarming Operation is a military action to disarm Tibetan rebels who were operating in Nepal after Dalai Lama fled to India under Chinese security action in Tibet in 1959. Lieutenant Colonel Satchit Shamser Rana was in charge of the mission from the Nepal Army in this operation.

== Historic background ==
While Dalai Lama was in Tibet, he was strengthening his military by training and equipping his soldiers, these soldiers were called Khampa in the Tibetan language. When Dalai Lama fled to India, some Khampas led by Gey Wangdi started to migrate down in the adjoining Nepal-Tibet border and started anti-China activities. Khampas were supported by the Indian government as well. Around that time, Indian troops were also deployed in Nepal-China border areas. They provided military intelligence and other guidance to the Khampas. Meanwhile, the Central Intelligence Agency (CIA) was also supporting the guerrilla movement in Tibet. This activity was against the foreign policy of Nepal.

Due to security risks, the government of China made an agreement with the Nepal government to control Khampa activities. After the agreement, Nepal decided to conduct a disarming operation against Khampas. The reconnaissance team of the Nepal Army found that nearly 9000 Khampas armed with adequate weapons, bullets and explosives had set up camp in Kesang located near Nilgiri Himalayan Mountains.

== The disarming mission ==
In 1974, King Birendra issued an order to peacefully disarm the Khampas settled in Mustang, bring them near Pokhara and prohibit them from proceeding toward China. Accordingly, Nepali troops moved toward Pokhara on July 15, 1974, for the initial preparation. Shreenath Battalion under Lieutenant Colonel Satchit Samser Rana was in charge for the mission.

Brigade headquarters was set up in Jomsom and the mission was started. Nepal Army made contact with Gey Wangdi, the leader of Khampas, to surrender and hand over the weapons. They were also promised to be given Nepali Citizenship, land and money. Initially, the rebels agreed and the date of handover was fixed for July 20, 1974 but the date was extended to July 26 upon request from Khampas. Khampas demanded additional time yet again and agreed to hand over the entire weaponry at midnight on July 31. However, they did not surrender.

Once the deadline passed, Nepal Army conducted an intensive search at Kesang camp located in Jomsom, Mustang just under the Mount Nilgiri near famous TILICHO Taal from August 1, 1974. Various kinds of weapons and ammunition were found buried under the ground and they were seized. Similarly, search operations was done in Chhusang, Samar, Ghiling and Ghami because there were tiny Khampas base camps in all following villages. Gey Wangdi was not captured. He was en route to India. After a few days, the Army received the message from the local administration that the team of Gey Wangdi was crossing the border from Nepalgunj. Gey Wangdi fell in ambush at Tinkarlipu, Doti on September 15, 1974, while trying to attack Nepal Police Post.

Confiscated items

- Rifles - 543
- Bren guns - 75
- Sten guns -35
- Pistols - 16
- 60 mm mortars - 8 (385 bombs)
- 57 mm RCL - 7 (320 shells)
- Communication sets - 5
- All types of ammunition - 2,02,349

After the success of disarming operation, King Birendra visited Kesang and a cabinet meeting was held there.
