= Tansen Pande =

Tansen Pande (1910–1966) was a prominent Dhrupad singer.

He was born Husseinuddin Dagar, the youngest son of Allabande Khan. His other three brothers, Nasiruddin, Rahimuddin and Imanuddin Khan Dagar, were also famous singers of Dhrupad style. He decided to return to the family's original religion, became a Hindu, and took the name Tansen Pande.

His son Saeeduddin Dagar was a Dhrupad performer who resided in Pune in western India.
