= Ranighat Palace =

Historic palace in Palpa, Nepal

Coordinates: 27°55′35″N 83°31′41″E

Rani Mahal
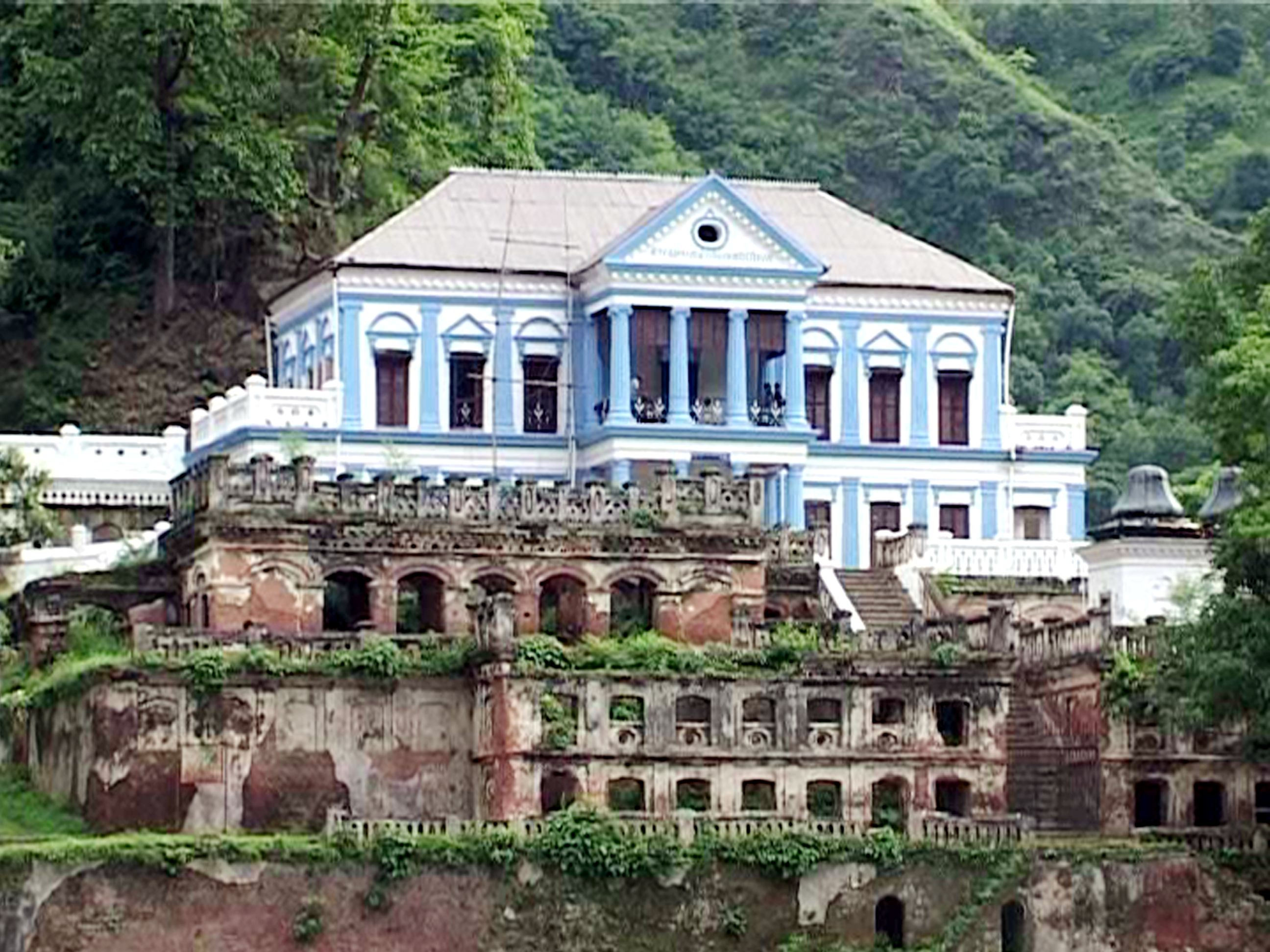
- Interactive map of the Rani Mahal area

General information
- Architectural style: Fusion of Neoclassical architecture, European styles of architecture
- Location: Palpa, Nepal
- Completed: 1893
- Cost: 35 crore
- Client: Khadga Shamsher Jang Bahadur Rana

Technical details
- Structural system: Brick and Mortar

Ranighat Palace or Rani Mahal (Nepali: रानीमहल) is a historic Rana palace located on the banks of Kali Gandaki River in Palpa district of Nepal. This palace was constructed by General Khadga Shamsher Jang Bahadur Rana in 1893.

== History ==
In 1885 Khadga Samsher Rana assassinated Ranauddip Shamsher Rana to make Bir Shumsher Jung Bahadur Rana as the prime minister and himself as the Commander in Chief of Nepal. He was in the line of succession for the next prime minister. In 1887 Khadga Samsher conspired to remove Bir Shumsher Jung Bahadur Rana from prime-ministership in an unsuccessful coup attempt. For this, he was arrested and forced to drop his royal titles and the position of Commander in Chief. He was banished to Thada, a place in Gulmi district in western Nepal. In 1888, a limited power was reinstated by assigning as the Governor General and the commander in chief (Tainathi) of western Nepal and allowed to relocated in Palpa-Gauda.

At Palpa-Gauda, Khadga Shumsher's youngest wife Tej Kumari Devi died in 1892. To commemorate his grief and the queen's last wish to construct a place of pilgrim, Khadga decided to build a palace. The name Rani Mahal literally translates as Queen's Palace.

The palace was designed by a British architect, and construction workers were brought from India. The four army platoon under him at Palpa and local villagers were also mobilized. To accomplish the construction, forced labour using neighbouring villagers was also used. Agri, a community of special caste, was employed to break the rock along the road to the palace and the foundation of the palace building. It took four years to complete the construction. He also named the nearby forest as Rani Ban (Queen's forest) along with naming the Ghats as Rani Ghat. In 1902, Khadga Samsher Rana along with his family fled to India abandoning Rani Mahal.

== Current status, reconstruction and restoration ==
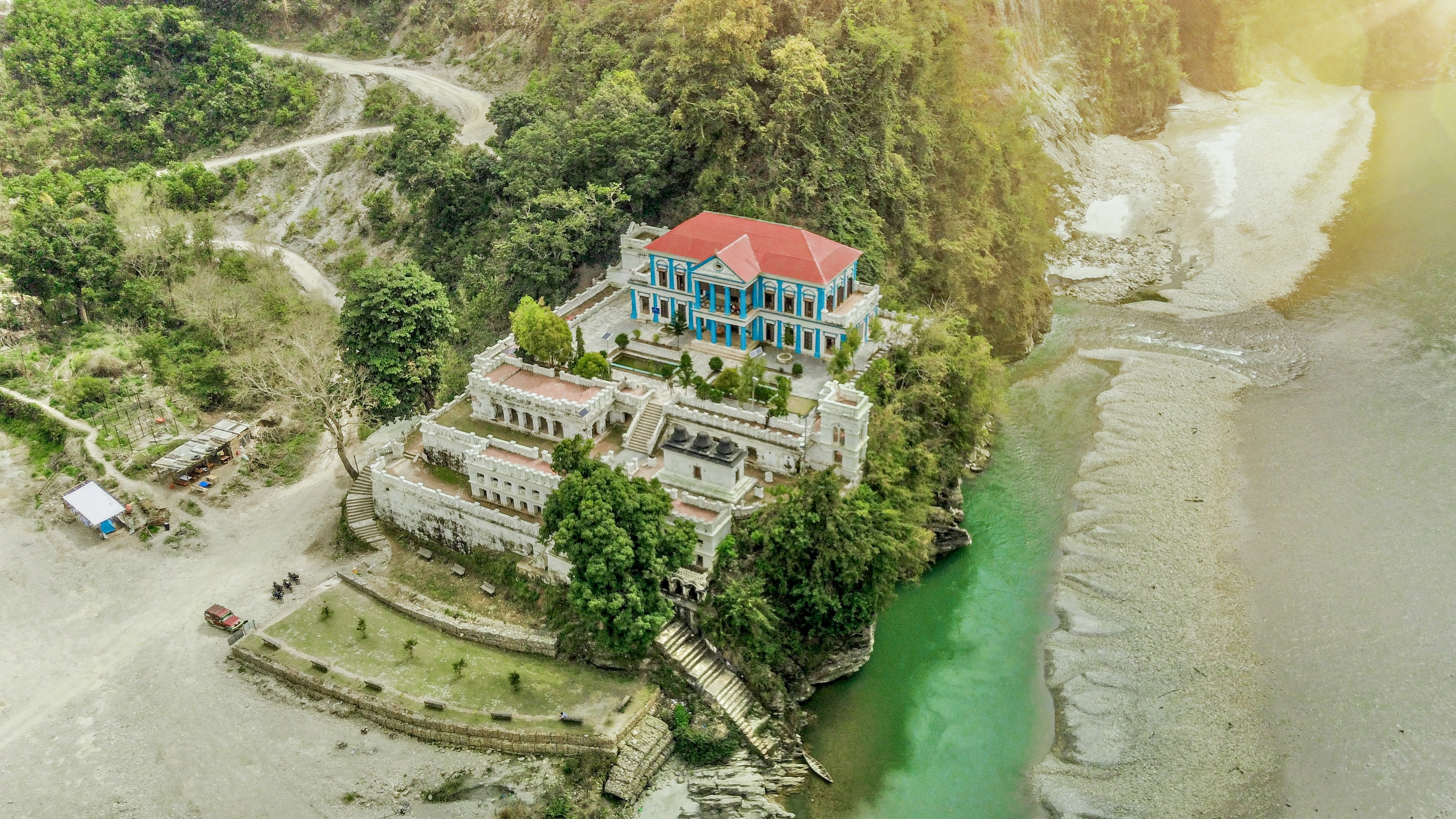

As Khadga Samsher abandoned the palace and fled to India, Rani Mahal was left behind without any proper owner or caretaker. Rani Mahal was in the verge of turning into rubble by the end of the 20th century. The poor condition of the palace was realized by the locals and became a concern of the government of Nepal. In 2017, the Government of Nepal allocated budget and restored the palace to the original state. A museum was also established in the building. To increase the tourism in the area, a new road was also constructed along the bank of Brangdi River.

== Access ==
It takes around half an hour to reach the Rani Mahal from Tansen via a motorable road. Also, foot trail from Kailash Nagar near the Batase Danda, about 13 km from Tansen leads to Ranimahal.

== Legacy ==
Rani Mahal is referred as the Taj Mahal of Nepal because both buildings are constructed in the memory of their lover and located on the bank of a river.

== Gallery ==
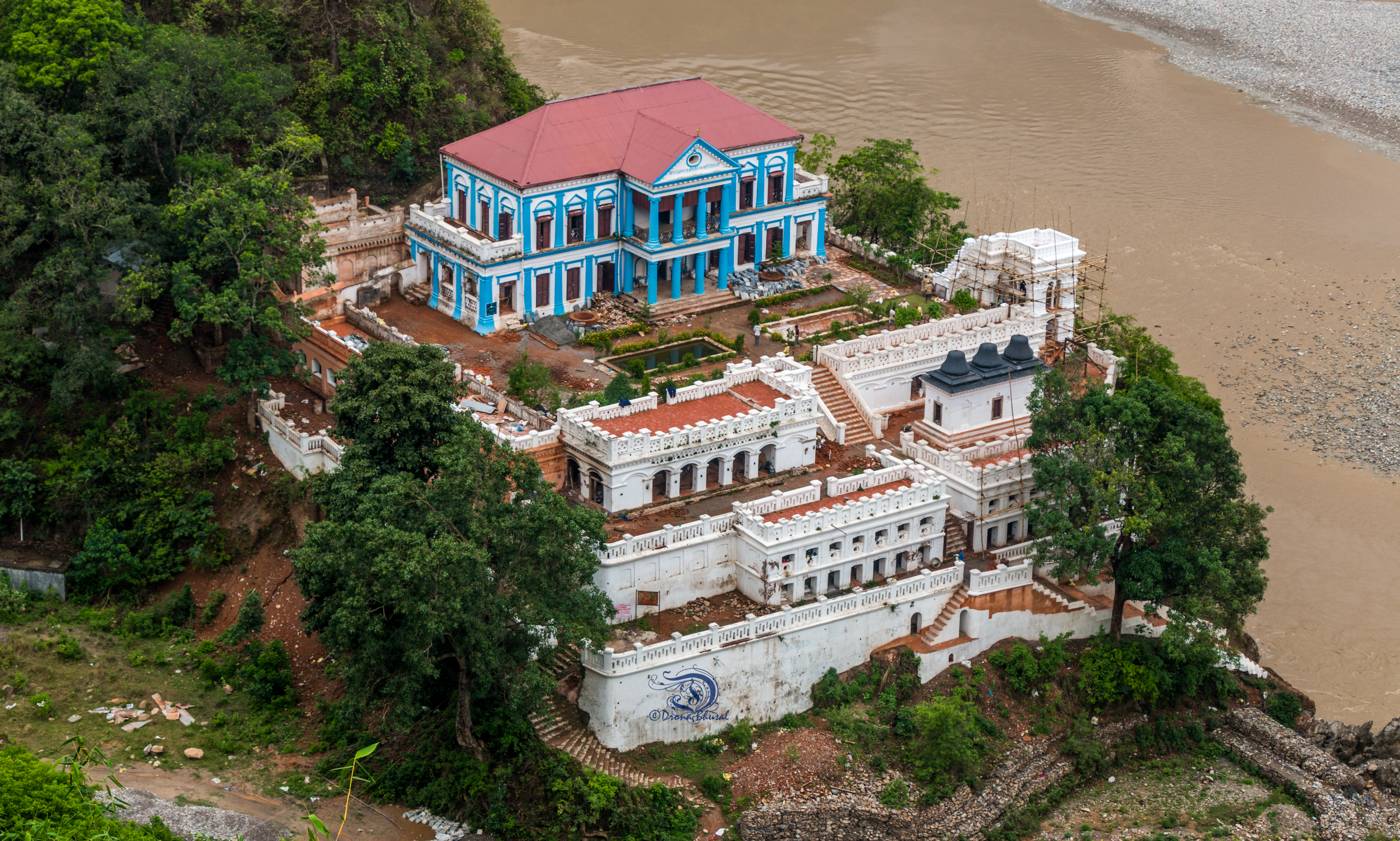
Aerial view of the palace

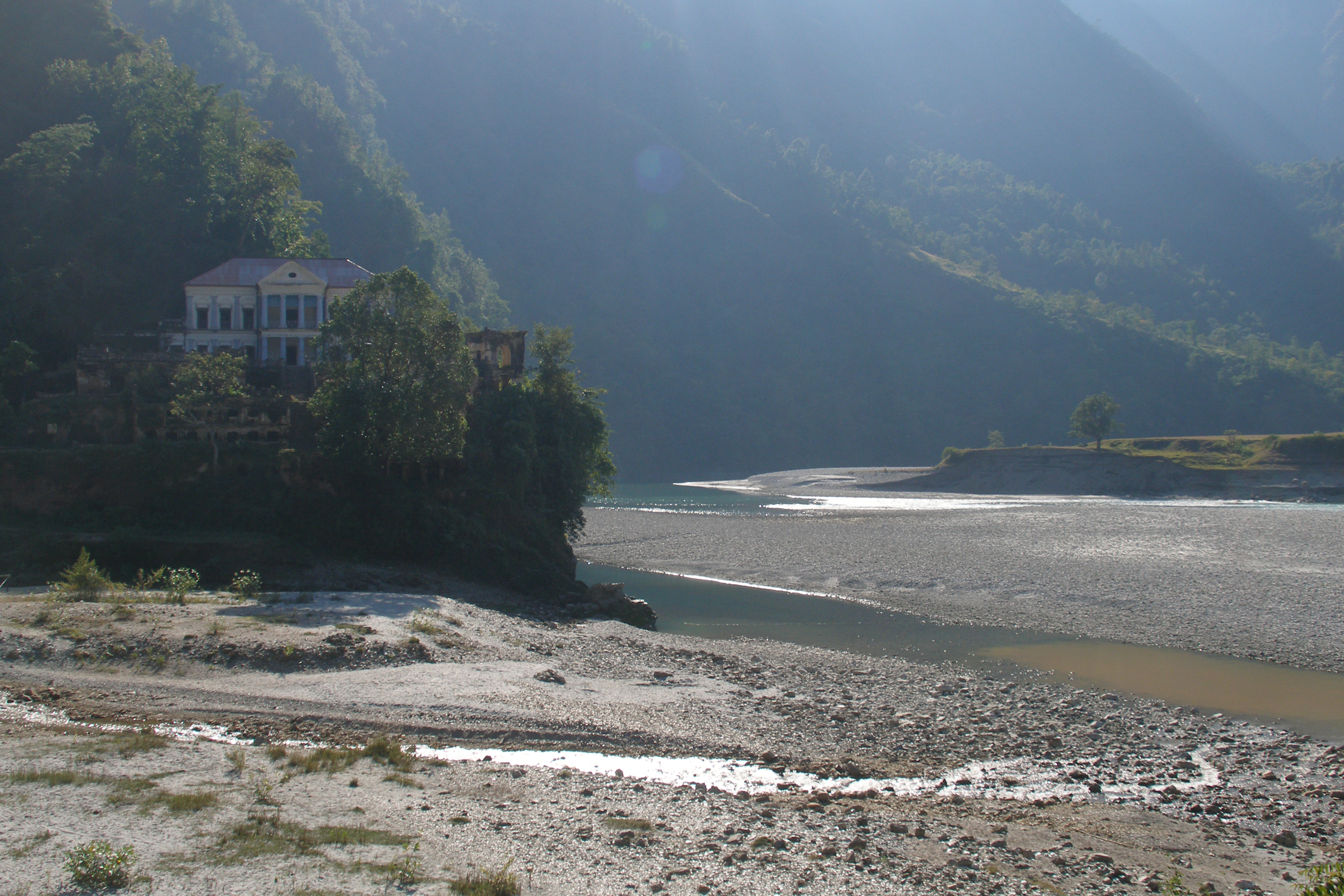
The palace is situated on the bank of Kaligandaki river.

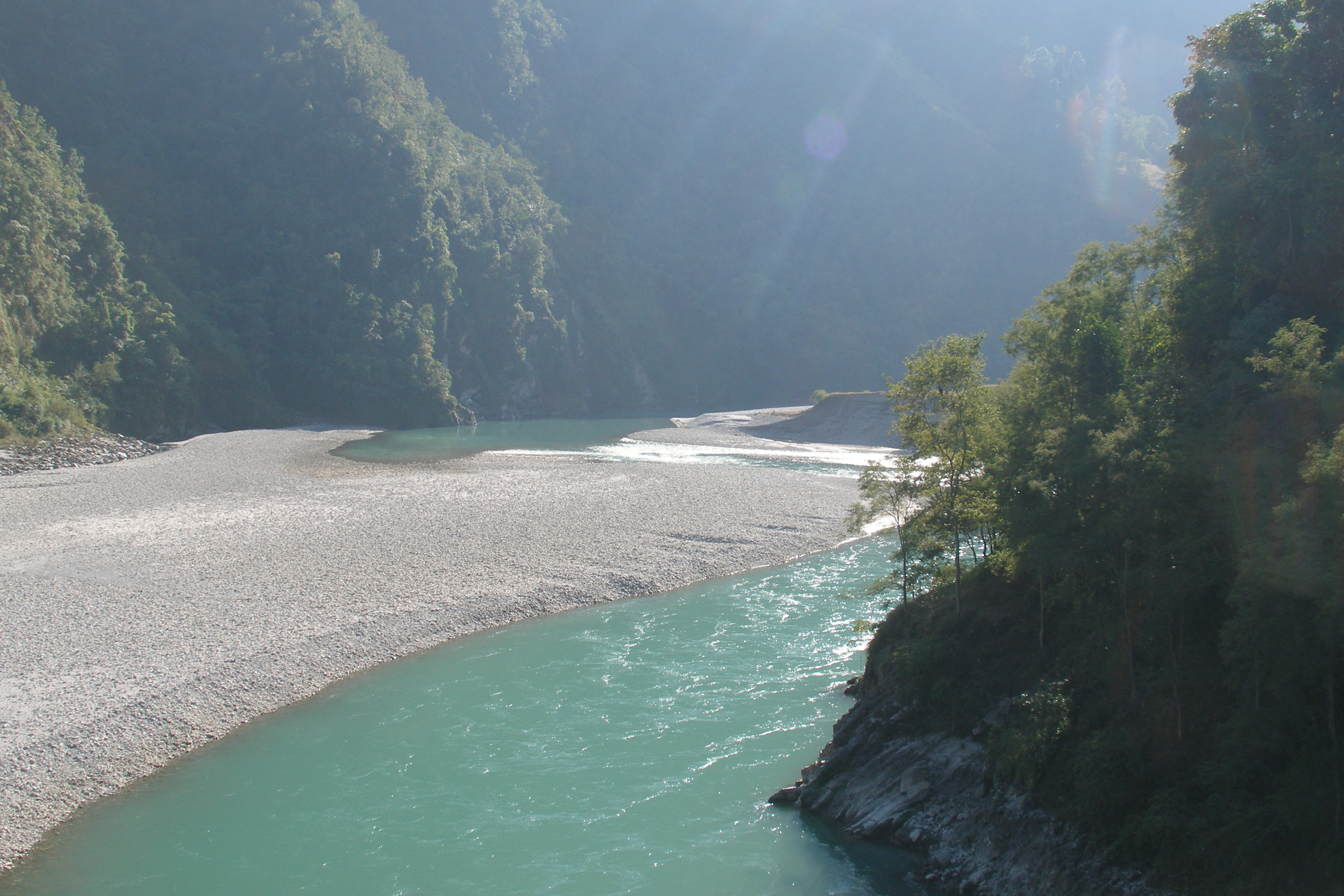
Kali Gandaki River

== See also ==
- Rana palaces of Nepal
- Tansen Durbar
- Seto Durbar
- Bhairabsthan Temple
