= Bhairabsthan Temple =

Hindu temple in Nepal

- Bhairabsthan Temple
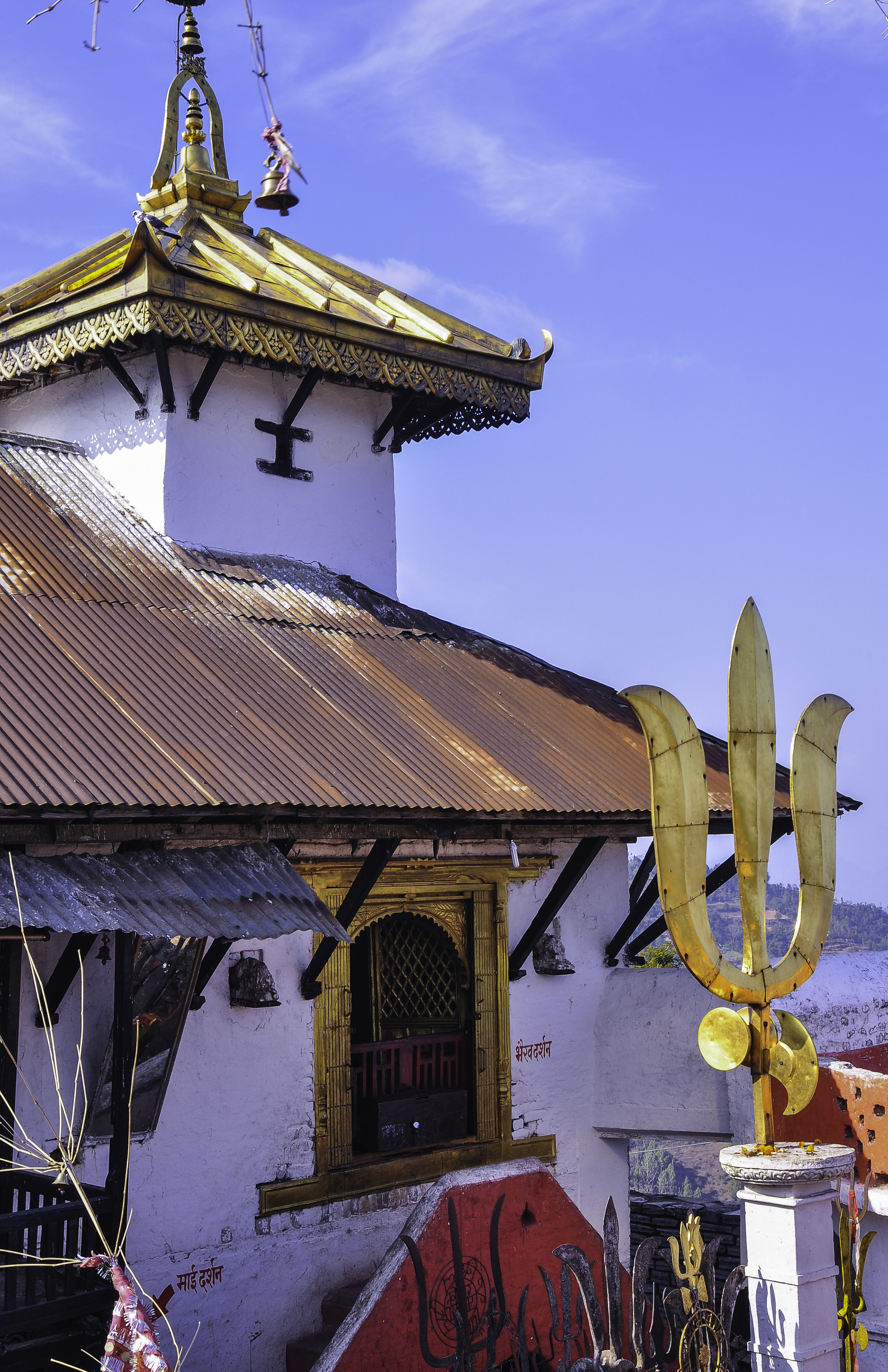
- Trident at Bhairabsthan Temple

- Location in Nepal

Religion
- Affiliation: Hinduism
- District: Palpa
- Deity: Bhairab
- Festival: Dashain

Location
- Location: Bhairabsthan
- Country: Nepal
- Interactive map of Bhairabsthan Temple
- Coordinates: 27.8697108°N 83.4765981°E

Bhairabsthan Temple (Nepali: भैरवस्थान) is a Hindu temple of Bhairab or Bhairava located about 9 km north west from the city of Tansen, in Palpa district of Nepal at an elevation of about 1470 m msl.

== History ==
The temple was established by king Mukunda Sen of the Sena dynasty when Palpa used to be the capital. At the time when Mukunda Sena attacked Kathmandu, he returned with the murti of lord Bhairav from Matsyendra Nath Temple and established it in Palpa as Bhairabsthan Temple.

== Traditions ==
The temple is visited by the people all over Nepal and mostly by the Hindus of Palpa and nearby districts. Hindu people worship at the temple mainly in Mahaastami of Dashain. Many pilgrims visit the temple in the month of Mangsir (November -December). The main days for worship at this temple are Tuesdays and Saturdays. During the festivals, animal sacrifices (buffalo, goat, ram and chicken) are performed in the temple. Pancha Bali is also performed, which involves the sacrifice of five kinds of animals namely buffalo, goat, sheep, hen and duck.

The main prasad of this temple is Rot (Nepali: रोट), which is a bread of rice flour mixed with various spices and fried in ghee. Firstly, the Rot is offered to Bhairab and then shared among the devotees.

== Attraction ==
The temple is famous for the iconic trident which is considered as the biggest in Nepal. The local village Bhairabsthan is also named after this temple.

== Gallery ==
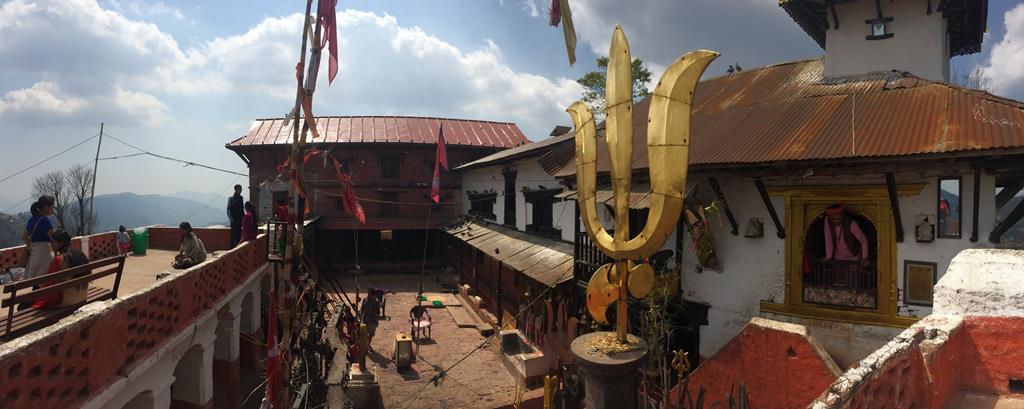
Temple surroundings

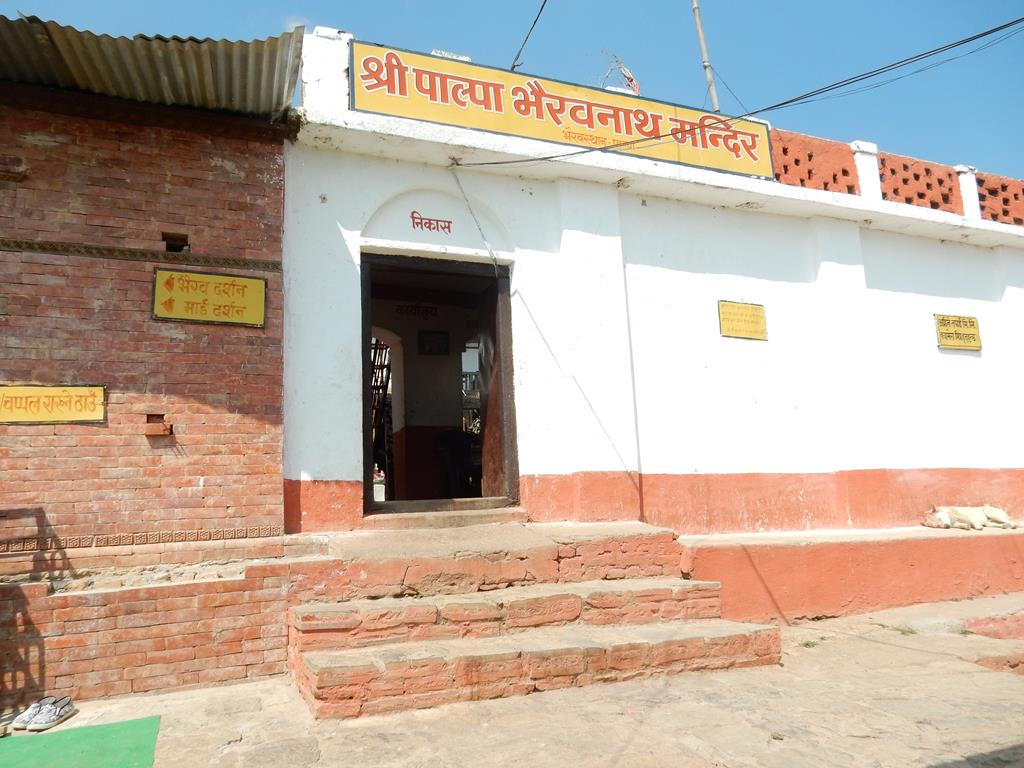
Entrance

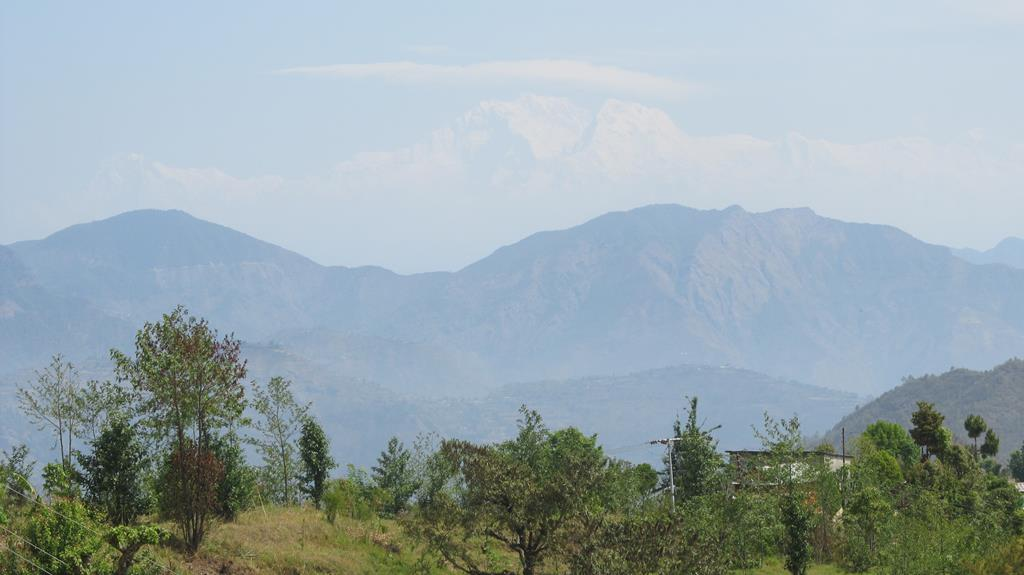
North view

== See also ==
- List of Hindu temples in Nepal
- Bagh Bhairab Temple
- Tansen Durbar
- Rani Mahal
