= Tansen Durbar =

- तानसेन दरबार
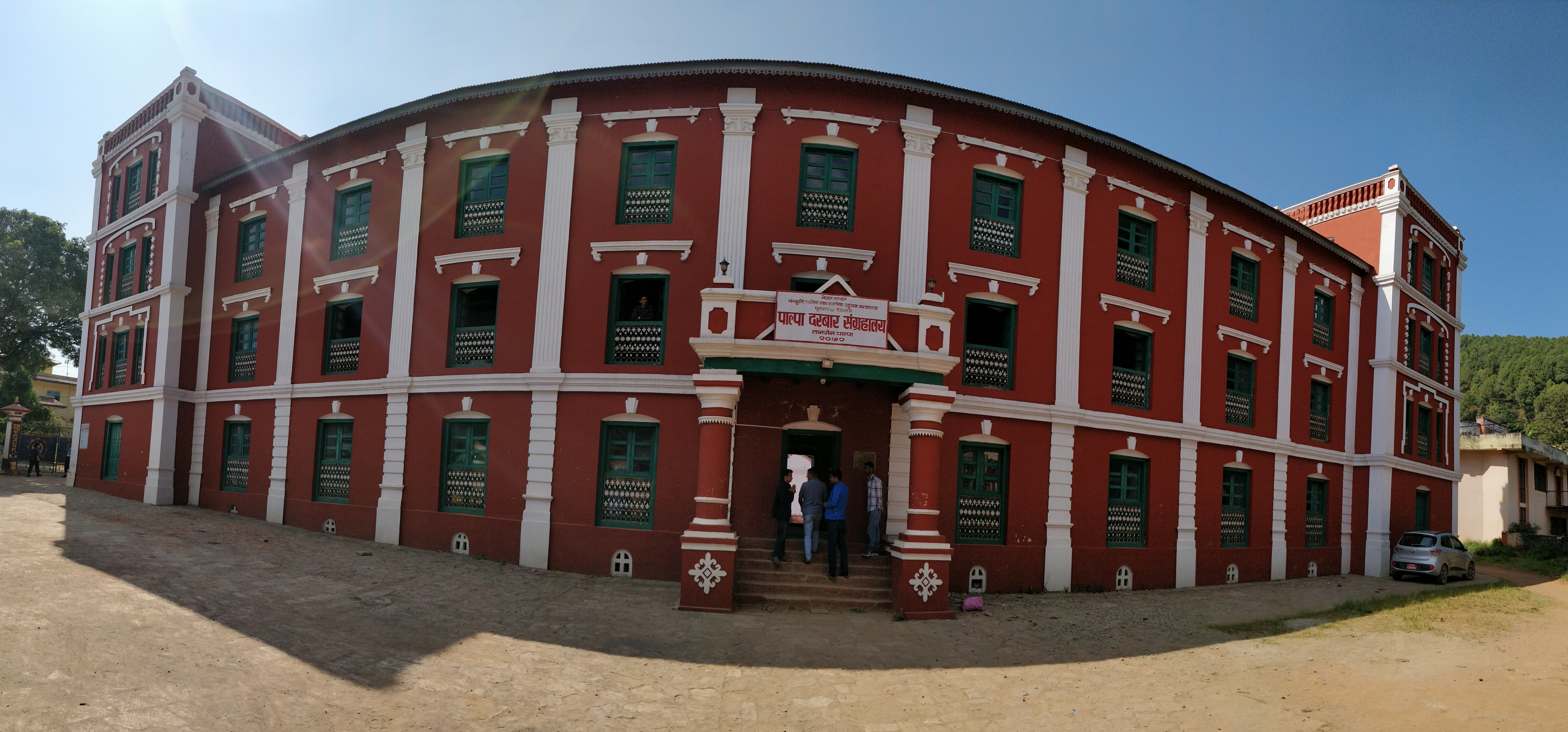
- Palpa Durbar & Museum Also known as Tansen Durbar
- Interactive map of the Tansen Durbar area
- Alternative names: Palpa Durbar & Museum

General information
- Status: Rebulit
- Location: Tansen, Palpa, Nepal, Tansen, Nepal
- Coordinates: 27.8673°N 83.5451°E
- Completed: 1927
- Destroyed: 2005

Tansen Durbar, also known as Palpa Durbar & Museum, is a historical palace and a museum. It was built in 1927 by Pratap Shamsher Jang Bahadur Rana. The Durbar is a grand palace in the town of Tansen, Nepal. It was the seat of the Rana governors during the Rana rule in Nepal.

The palace was destroyed in 2005 by Maoists in the Nepalese Civil War and was rebuilt and reopened in 2008.

== Gallery ==
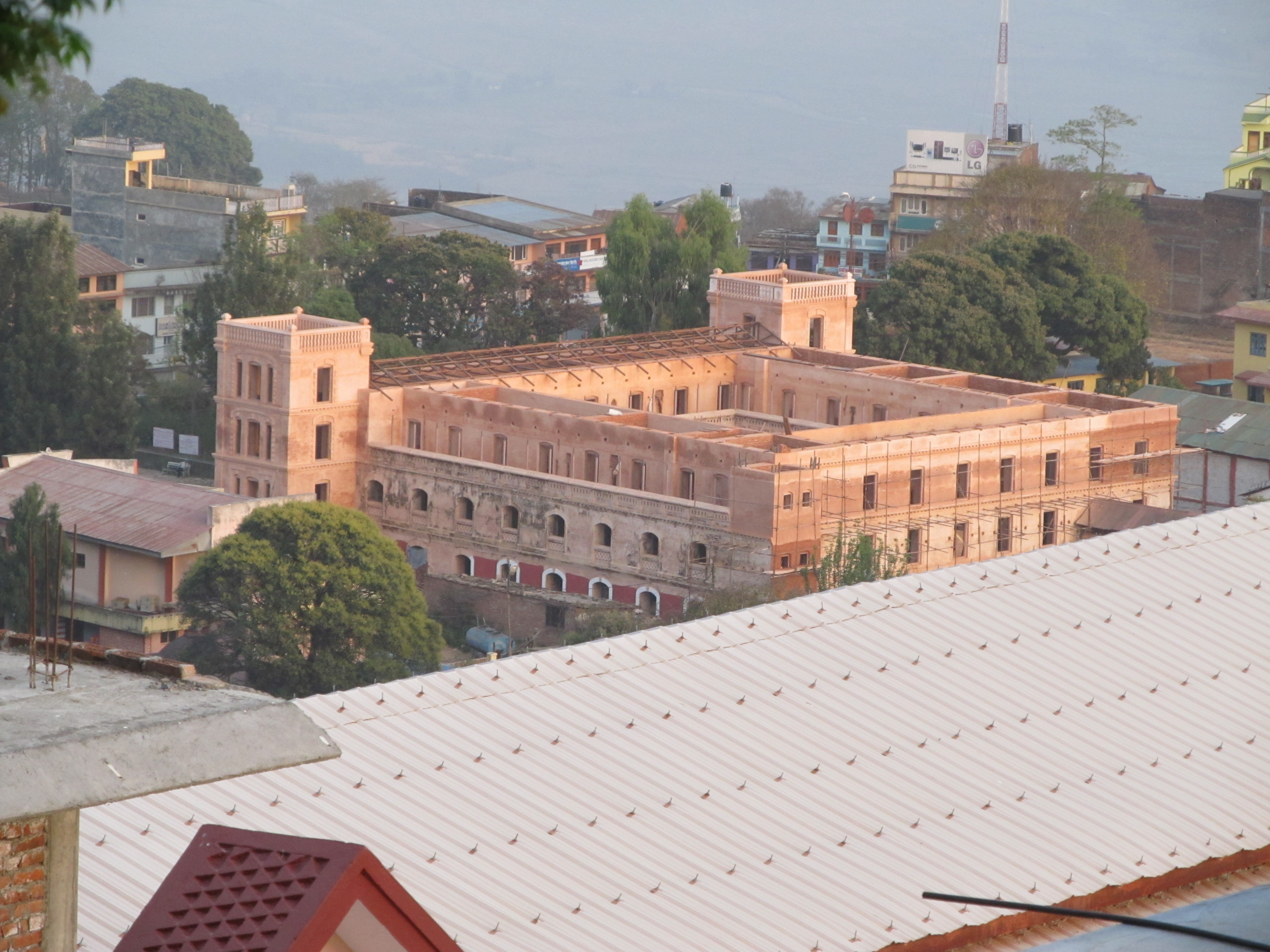

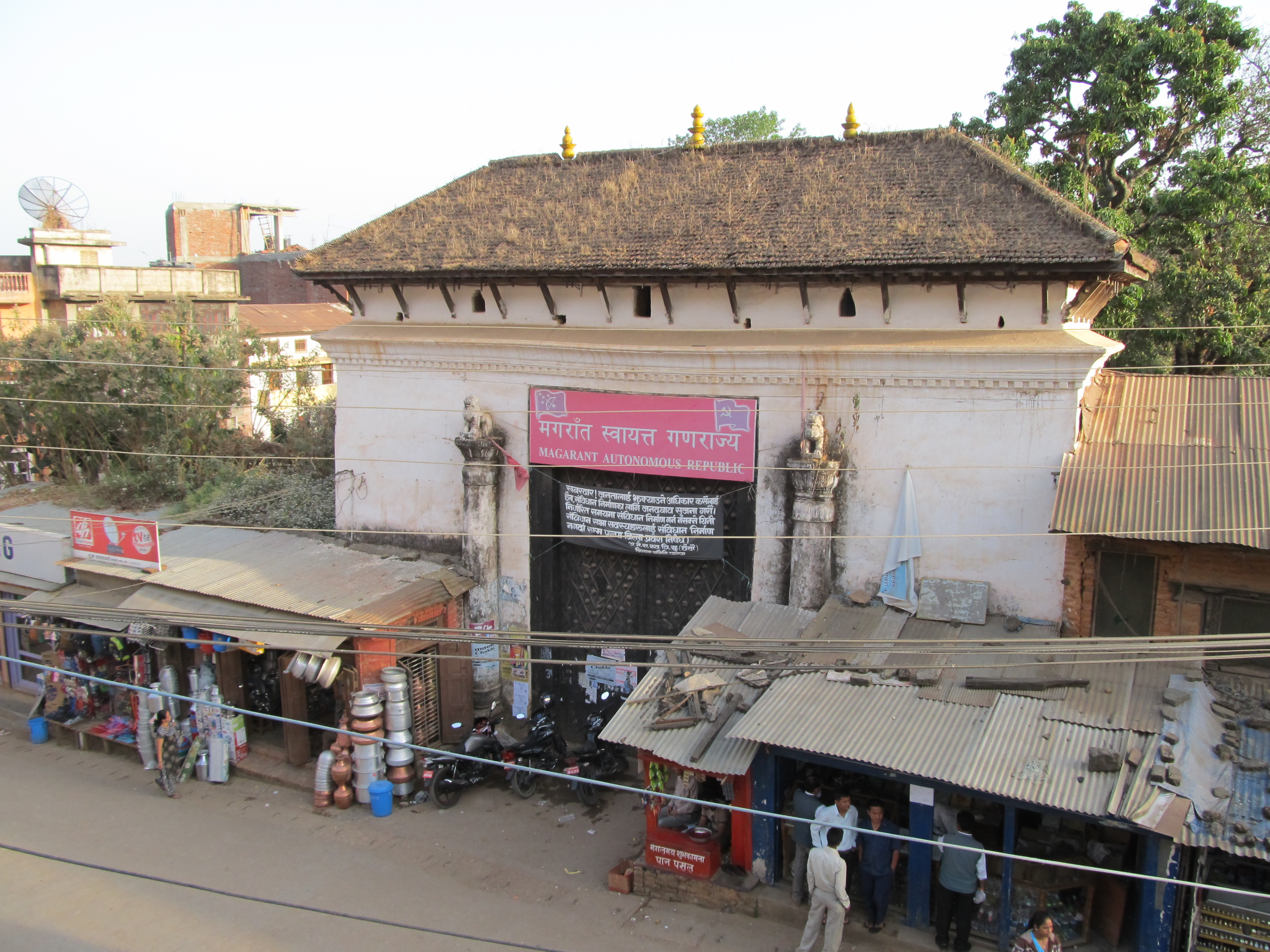

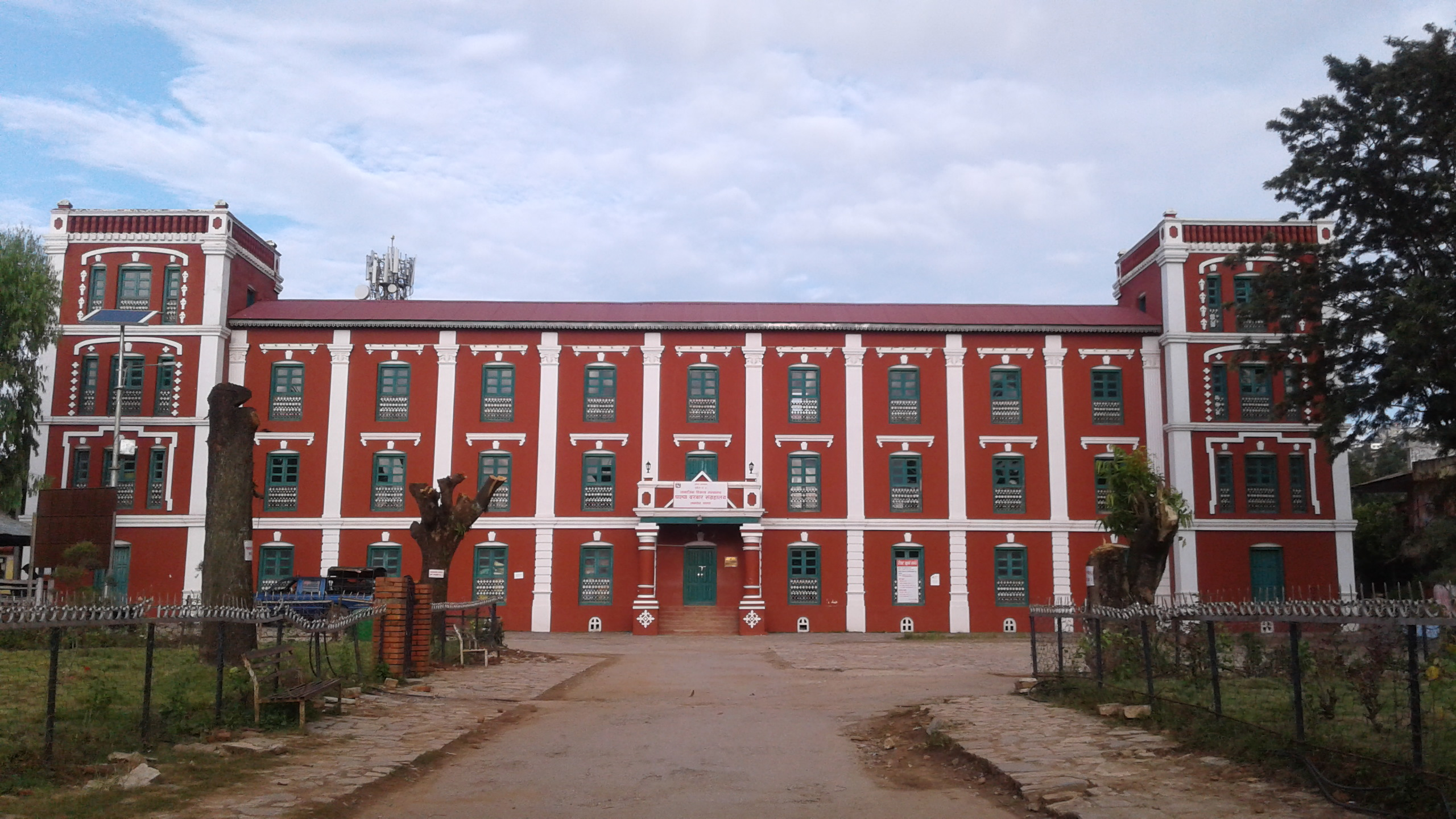

== See also ==
- Rana palaces of Nepal
- Kaiser Mahal
- Jaulakhel Durbar
- Singha Durbar
- Rani Mahal
