= Military ranks of Nepal =

The Military ranks of Nepal are the military insignia used by the Nepalese Army which is the only component of the Nepalese Armed Forces. Being a Landlocked country, Nepal does not have a navy. Nepali military rank structure is a mixture of Indian subcontinent and Nepal's own style.

== Commissioned officer ranks ==
The rank insignia of commissioned officers.

Rank group	General / flag officers				Senior officers			Junior officers
Nepali	महारथी (प्रधानसेनापती)	रथी	उपरथी	सहायक रथी	महासेनानी	प्रमुख सेनानी	सेनानी	सहसेनानी	उपसेनानी	सहायक सेनानी
Romanagari	Mahārathī (pradhān senāpti)	Rathī	Uparathī	Sahaayak rathee	Mahāsēnānī	Pramukh senaanee	Senaanee	Sahasēnānī	Upasēnānī	Sahaayak senaanee
Literal translation	Great charioteer (Master commander)	Charioteer	Vice charioteer	Assistant charioteer	Great commander	Chief commander	Commander	Companion commander	Vice commander	Assistant commander
Official translation	COAS General	Lieutenant general	Major general	Brigadier general	Colonel	Lieutenant colonel	Major	Captain	Lieutenant	Second lieutenant
Nepali Army

=== Former insignia ===
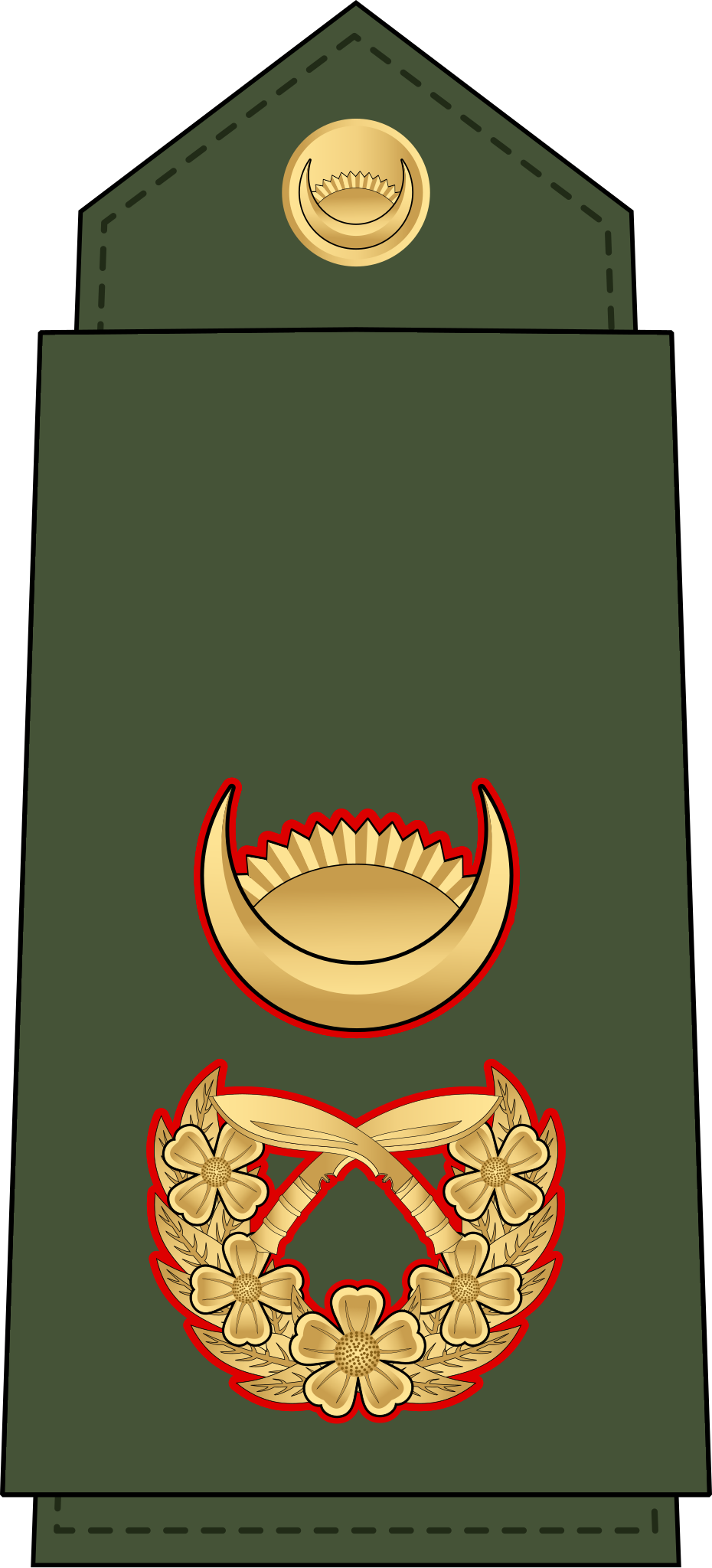
Rank group	General/flag officers
Nepali	अतिरथी	प्रधान सेनापति	महारथी	उपरथी
Romanagari	Atimahārathī	Pradhān senāpti	Mahārathī	Uparathī
Literal translation	Great charioteer	Master commander	Great charioteer	Vice charioteer
English translation	Field marshal	General of the army	General	Major general
Nepali Army

== Other ranks ==
The rank insignia of non-commissioned officers and enlisted personnel.

Rank group	Senior NCOs				Junior NCOs		Enlisted
Nepali	प्रमुख सुवेदार	सुवेदार	जमदार	हुद्दा	अमल्दार	प्यूठ	सिपाही	फलोअर्स
Romanagari	Pramukh Suvēdār	Suvēdār	Jamadār	Huddā	Amaldār	Piyuth	Sipahi	Phaloars
Literal translation	Chief		Muster holder	Rank	Standard-bearer		Soldier
Official translation	Chief warrant officer	Warrant officer first class	Warrant officer second class	Sergeant	Corporal	Lance corporal	Private	Followers
Nepali Army							No insignia	No insignia

=== 1991 ===
Rank group	Senior NCOs								Junior NCOs		Enlisted
Nepali Army
Nepali Army	Subedar major	Subedar	Jamadar	Regimental sergeant major	Regimental quartermaster sergeant	Company sergeant major	Company quartermaster sergeant	Sergeant	Naik	Lance naik	Sepahi

== See also ==
- List of ranks in Nepal army after Nepal-Anglo war
