= List of Military Cross recipients from the Royal Nepal Army =

This page lists the members of the Royal Nepal Army who were awarded the Military Cross, the third highest British gallantry award, while they served in Allied Forces in the Second World War.

== Background ==
The Royal Nepal Army fought on the side of the Allied Forces during the First and the Second World Wars. Many Nepalese who fought in the regiments of the British Indian Army won the Victoria Cross. However, the Nepalese who served in the Royal Nepal Army in the Allied Forces could be awarded, at the most, only the Military Cross, the third highest gallantry award of the British and erstwhile Commonwealth forces. According to historian Prem Singh Basnyat, the Rana rulers of Nepal unofficially convinced British authorities not to award the Victoria Cross to personnel from the Royal Nepal Army. This was because such personnel would then have to be shown appropriate respect by the Rana Prime Minister and other senior members of the ruling classes, which was unacceptable to them. This page lists the recipients of the Military Cross from the Nepal Army who fought in World War II on the side of the Allied Forces.

== Verifiable recipients ==
The following are the verifiable recipients of the Military Cross from the Royal Nepal Army.

- Chandra Bahadur Karki, 1917 Waziristan
- Chutra Bahadur Thapa, Burma Campaign.
- Gupta Bahadur Gurung, Burma Campaign.
- Hom Bahadur Gurung, Burma Campaign, 1944.
- Shailendra Bahadur Mahat, Burma Campaign, 1944.
- Jagat Bahadur Khatri, Burma Campaign, 1945.
