= Bhairavnath Battalion =

Special forces unit of the Nepalese Army

The Bhairavnath Battalion is a special forces unit of the Nepalese Army. The battalion was trained by Israeli Special Forces to fulfill a need to establish a special forces wing to modernize the army. The Bhairavnath Battalion , Yuddha Bhairav and the Mahabir Ranger Regiment are the only special forces units of Nepal. The Mahabir Regiment is the only Ranger Regiment in the Nepalese Army where as Yuddha Bhairav is Tier 1 elite special forces of Nepalese army. Bhairavnath is recognize as a airborne unit.

Post civil war, the battalion has been a part of special operation forces brigade and is the Parachute regiment. The Bhairvnath battalion is a part of the no. 10 brigade, also known as the special operation forces brigade. Bhairavnath battalion has its garrison in Maharajgunj, Kathmandu, Bagmati Province. Bhairavnath shares its headquarter with the Nepal army para training school and the special forces battalion also known as the 'Yuddha Bhairav battalion'. Yuddha Bhairav is a special forces battalion whereas Bhairavnath is airborne. Soldiers of Bhairavnath battalion wears "para commando" tabs on their uniforms.The Bhairavnath Battalion is designed to operate the most deadliest tasks and operations, giving it the name as "THE SPECIAL FORCES OF NEPAL."

The 10 Brigade of the Nepal Army Special Operations has its roots in the Bhairab Nath Battalion, which played an important role during the Maoist insurgency in Nepal.

During the conflict, D and E Companies of the Bhairab Nath Battalion were merged to form a new special forces unit called the Yudha Bhairab Battalion. At the same time, some officers and soldiers from Bhairab Nath were transferred to help establish the Maha Bir Battalion (Rangers).

Today, the Special Operations Brigade is associated with four major battalions:

Bhairab Nath Battalion – Para Commando Yudha Bhairab Battalion – Special Forces Maha Bir Battalion – Rangers Shinganath Battalion – Commando

These units share a common history and lineage connected to the Bhairab Nath Battalion and developed specialized capabilities for difficult combat and special operations.

During the Maoist insurgency, personnel from these units took part in numerous major operations across Nepal. Some notable battles and operations included Gurase in Salyan, Paudhaun in Kailali, Dharchowk in Chitwan, Mahat Gaun in Rukum, and Manakamana in Syangja.

The history of the 10 Brigade therefore reflects the evolution of Nepal Army's specialized combat units during one of the country's most challenging periods.
