= Shardul Jung Gulma =

Ceremonial army regiment of Nepal

- शार्दूल जंग गुल्म
- Active: 1806–present
- Country: Nepal
- Branch: Nepali Army
- Type: Infantry
- Role: Ceremonial
- Garrison/HQ: Hanuman Dhoka
- Nickname: Gurujyu Paltan (Note: The company is also known as the Gurju Paltan, Gurju ko Paltan, Guruju Paltan, Guruju ko Paltan, and Gurujyu ko Paltan)
- Colors: Black daura-suruwal

The Shardul Jung Gulma (Nepali: शार्दूल जंग गुल्म, romanized: Śārdūl Jaṅga Company), also known as Gurujyu Paltan, (Note: The company is also known as the Gurju Paltan, Gurju ko Paltan, Guruju Paltan, Guruju ko Paltan, and Gurujyu ko Paltan) is the oldest ceremonial infantry unit of the Nepali Army. Today, it serves as a heritage unit, preserving Nepal's military traditions and participating in state ceremonies and cultural festivals in the Kathmandu Valley.

== Names ==
The unit's official military designation is Shardul Jung Gulma (शार्दूल जंग गुल्म). Shardul refers to a mythical creature in Hindu mythology, often depicted as guardians at the gates of Hindu temples. Jung is a loanword from Persian meaning "war," while Gulma is the Nepali military term for a company.

The unit is also known by several names, including Gurujyu Paltan, Gurujyu ko Paltan, Guruju Paltan, Guruju ko Paltan, and Gurju Paltan which comes from its historical association with the royal priest of the Nepalese royal court. Gurujyu combines Guru, meaning "spiritual teacher", with the honorific suffix -jyu. Ko means "of" and paltan is a Nepali military term derived from the English word "platoon". The name Gurujyu ko Paltan therefore means "The platoon of the Guru". The word Gurujyu gradually corrupted to Guruju and Gurju over time.

== Histroy ==
The origins of the company trace back to the unification of Nepal. The unit originally consisted of a band of soldiers who marched alongside King Prithvi Narayan Shah during his military expansion out of the Gorkha Kingdom. Following their crucial role in the conquest of the Kathmandu Valley in 1768, the company was stationed at the Kathmandu Durbar Square, which served as the central seat of power for the newly unified Kingdom of Nepal.

A significant shift in the company's purpose occurred years later in 1806. Following the Bhandarkhal Massacre, the company was reassigned to serve as the personal guards for Pandit Vijaya Raj Pandey, an ally of Jung Bahadur Rana. When Pandey was later appointed as the Bada Gurujyu ("Head Guru") of the royal court, the company which was responsible for his security became known by the name Gurujyu ko Paltan ("The platoon of the Guru"). The name was gradually corrupted to Guruju and Gurju over time and remains associated with the company to this day.

Although initially viewed as a symbol of intimidation and conquest by the residents of the Kathmandu Valley, the regiment gradually became assimilated into the local culture. Over centuries, the unit transitioned from an occupying royal guard into an integral fixture of the valley's cultural and religious heritage.

== Role and duties ==
Shardul Jung Gulma soldiers firing ceremonial volley

Today, the company operates as a dedicated heritage unit within the Nepali Army. One of its primary responsibilities is the security and upkeep of the Kathmandu are, a World Heritage Site, safeguarding its numerous cultural and historical artifacts.

Beyond guard duties, the company is highly integrated into the religious traditions of the Kathmandu Valley, participating in approximately 55 different jatra throughout the year. Between 30 and 60 soldiers are deployed to lead processions for major events, including Fulpati, Indra Jatra, Bisket Jatra and the Rato Machindranath Jatra. By tradition, these sacred processions cannot commence until the Gurujyu Paltan fires a ceremonial volley from their muskets.

To fulfill their cultural duties, soldiers in the unit receive extensive training in traditional Nepalese musical instruments, including the madal, bansuri, dhol, tambar, and jhyampta, allowing them to perform historical military marches and festival music.

== Uniform ==
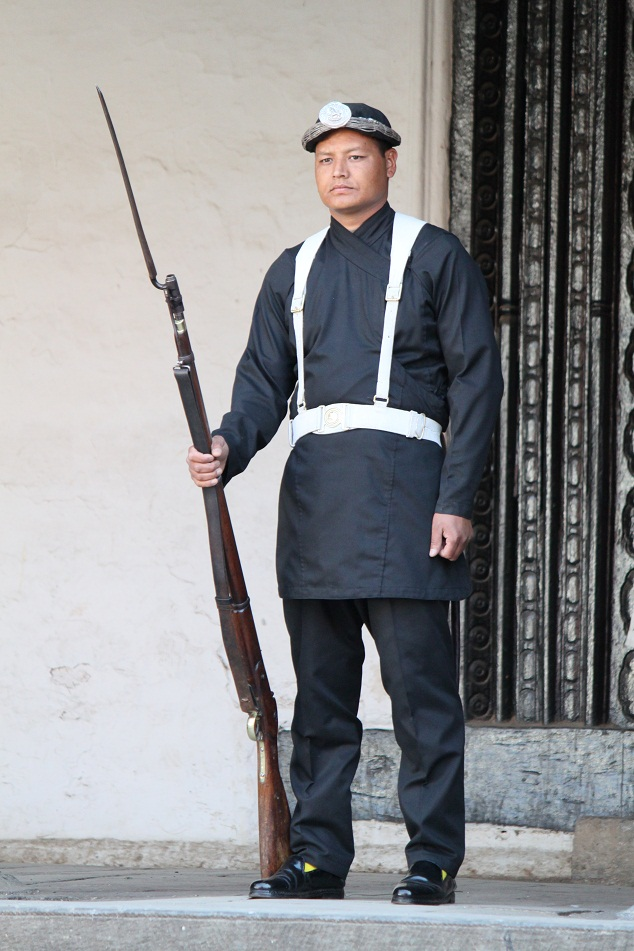
Shardul Jung Gulma soldier in the unit's traditional uniform

The company is one of the most visually distinguishable units in the Nepali Army, retaining a distinct uniform that hearkens back to the 18th-century unification era.

The standard uniform for infantrymen consists of a black Daura-Suruwal, white leather cross-belts, bright yellow socks, and black shoes. Military ranks are distinguished by small differences in the uniform, specifically the shape and metal of the ornaments attached to the soldiers' hats. The unit commander wears a special uniform with a white jama, a white Patuka (cloth belt) around the waist for carrying the khukuri and a gold chandtoda ornament attached to the headgear. The unit commander also wears a single white cross-belt from one shoulder to the opposite side of the waist.

== Equipment ==
The commander and soldiers carry khukuri, some also carry talwar, while the unit commander also carries a traditional shield. The company is also the only modern unit still armed with Bharuwa Bandook—antique flintlock muskets that have been passed down for at least 250 years. Because the vintage flintlocks are no longer commercially manufactured, they are preserved as an important part of the unit's military heritage. The black powder used to fire ceremonial blank rounds from these muskets is produced exclusively by the Nepali Army for the unit's use.

== See also ==
- Military history of Nepal
