= Nepalese Military Academy =

Coordinates: 27.686°N 85.448°E

- Motto in English: Knowledge, Service, Leadership
- Type: Military academy
- Established: 26 December 1986; 39 years ago
- Commandant: Brigadier General Prakash Bahadur Chand
- Location: Kharipati, Bagmati, Nepal
- Campus: Rural 45 acres
- Colors: Blood red, blue and white
- Website: www.nma.mil.np

The Nepalese Military Academy is a training institute for future officers of the Nepalese Army located at Kharipati, Bhaktapur. The mission statement of the academy is to "commission proficient platoon commanders, who are professionally capable of fulfilling their assigned responsibilities skilfully with vigour". It was founded on December 26, 1986.
