= Pradeep Jung =

Nepali general

Lieutenant General Pradeep Jung KC
- प्रदीप जंग केसी
- Born: 1 December 1968 (age 57); Kathmandu, Nepal
- Military career
- Allegiance: Nepal
- Branch: Nepali Army
- Service years: 1989–present
- Rank: Lieutenant General
- Service number: 1673
- Commands: Vice Chief of Army Staff; GOC of the Mid Division
- Conflicts: UNIFIL; UNTSO; MINUSTAH
- Awards: Army Service Medal; Foreign Service Medal; UN Medals (UNIFIL, UNTSO, MINUSTAH); Royal Guard Medal; Silver Coronation Medal; Birendra Aishworya Service Medal; Long Service Medal; Nature Conservation Medal; Chief of Army Staff (COAS) Commendation Badge

Lieutenant General Pradeep Jung K.C., is a three star officer of the Nepali Army and incumbent Vice Chief of Army staff (VCOAS) of the Nepali Army. He is also the former GOC of the Mid Division of the Nepali Army.

== Personal life ==
Pradeep was born on 1 December 1968 in Kathmandu, Nepal. He is married to Mrs. Laxmi K.C., and the couple is blessed with two sons, Pujan and Pratik. He enjoys cycling, trekking, playing tennis, and exploring new places, reflecting his active and adventurous personality.

== Military career ==
Pradeep began his military career by Joining the then Royal Nepalese Army (now Nepali Army) as an officer cadet on 16 October 1987 and was commissioned as an officer on 26 February 1989. He attained his current rank of Lieutenant General on 25 November 2024. Over his 36 years of dedicated service, he has undergone extensive military training both domestically and internationally. His domestic training includes the Officer Basic Training, Young Officers Training, All Arms Field Engineering Course, Regimental Signal Officer Course, Company Commander Course, Junior Staff Course, Officer Intelligence and Security Course, Command and Staff College, Leadership and Management Training, Higher Command and Management Course, and Brigade Commander Orientation Course. Internationally, he has completed the Intelligence Staff Officers Course in India, the United Nations Multinational Platoon Exercise in Bangladesh, the United Nations Peacekeeping Command Post Exercise in India, the Interviewing Officers Course in Pakistan, the Comprehensive Security Response to Terrorism in the USA, and the prestigious National Defense Course (NDC) in Nigeria.

Throughout his career, Lt. Gen. Pradeep has held several prominent appointments. He served as an Instructor at the Army School from 2001 to 2003, Company Commander of an Independent Infantry Company in 2005, and Battalion Commander of an Infantry Battalion from 2006 to 2007. He was also the Chief Instructor at the Army School from 2007 to 2008 and served as Brigade Operations Officer for an Infantry Brigade during three separate intervals in 2005, 2008, and 2010 to 2012. The different appointments include Deputy Chief of Staff for Logistics at Division Headquarters from 2013 to 2014, Brigade Commander of an Infantry Brigade from 2018 to 2019, and Director of the Directorate of Ceremony and Protocol at Army Headquarters from 2019 to 2020. Likewise, he served as Chief of Staff at Division Headquarters, followed by roles as Deputy Commanding Chief of the Western Command Headquarters, Director General of the Military Intelligence Corps, and Head of Master General of Ordnance. He also served as the Division Commander of the Mid Division and currently holds the esteemed position of Vice Chief of Army Staff.

Lt. Gen. Pradeep served as the Defense Attaché to the United Kingdom from 2014 to 2017, representing Nepal. Over the course of his career, he has been decorated with medals and honors including the Army Service Medal, Foreign Service Medal, UN Medals (UNIFIL, UNTSO, MINUSTAH), Royal Guard Medal, Silver Coronation Medal, Birendra Aishworya Service Medal, Long Service Medal, Nature Conservation Medal, and the Chief of Army Staff (COAS) Commendation Badge.

In addition to his professional achievements, Lt. Gen. Pradeep has visited India, China, Pakistan, Bangladesh, the United States of America, Haiti, the Dominican Republic, the United Kingdom, France, Belgium, Germany, Switzerland, Ireland, Luxemburg, Malta, Thailand, Japan, Israel, Syria, Egypt, Jordan, Lebanon, Nigeria, the Maldives, Sri Lanka, Singapore and Malaysia. Academically, He holds a Master’s Degree in Public Administration (MPA) from Tribhuvan University.

=== United Nations peacekeeping missions ===
Lt. Gen. Pradeep has participated in five United Nations missions in different intervals of time. He served in the United Nations Interim Force in Lebanon (UNIFIL) on three occasions, first as a Platoon Commander in 1993, then as a Company Commander in 2000, and later as Senior Planning Officer (Chief G-5) in 2009 at the Sector Headquarters. Additionally, he served as a Military Observer with the United Nations Truce Supervision Organization (UNTSO) from 2003 to 2004. His final UN mission was with the United Nations Stabilization Mission in Haiti (MINUSTAH) from 2012 to 2013 as Protocol Chief.
