= Nepali Army =

Land warfare branch of the Nepali Armed Forces

- Nepālī Sēnā
- Emblem of the Nepali Army
- Founded: 1559; 467 years ago
- Country: Nepal
- Type: Army
- Role: Land warfare
- Size: 96,500 active personnel (2026): Budget: US$430 million (2026); Spending: 3.0% of GDP (2026)
- Part of: Nepali Armed Forces
- Headquarters: Jungi Adda, Bhadrakali, Kathmandu
- Nickname: Gorkhali Sena
- Mottos: कायर हुनु भन्दा मर्नु राम्रो। ("Kayar hunu bhanda marnu ramro." lit. "Better to die than to be a coward.")
- Colours: Gold, red
- March: जय महाकाली। आयो गोर्खाली। ("Jaya Mahakali, Aayo Gorkhali!" lit. "Hail Goddess Kali, The Gorkhalis have arrived!")
- Anniversaries: Maha Shivaratri
- Engagements: See list: In the Indian Subcontinent; 1763 Mughal Bengal Subah invasion of Nepal; Battle of Sindhuli; Battle of Kirtipur; Battle of Kathmandu; Battle of Bhaktapur; Sino−Nepalese War; Nepal–Sikh war; Anglo−Nepalese War; Nepalese−Tibetan War; Indian Rebellion of 1857; First Waziristan Campaign; Second Waziristan Campaign; Third Waziristan Campaign; Nepalese Civil War (1996–2006); Outside the Indian subcontinent; World War I; Third Anglo-Afghan War; World War II; Somali Civil War; Second Sudanese Civil War; Sierra Leone Civil War; Eritrean–Ethiopian War; 1999 East Timorese crisis; Syrian Civil War
- Website: nepalarmy.mil.np

Commanders
- Supreme Commander-in-chief: (Nepal) President Ram Chandra Paudel
- Chief of the Army Staff: General Ashok Raj Sigdel
- Vice Chief of the Army Staff: Lieutenant General Pradeep Jung K.C.
- Assistant Chief of the Army Staff: Lieutenant General Ganesh Kumar Shrestha

Insignia
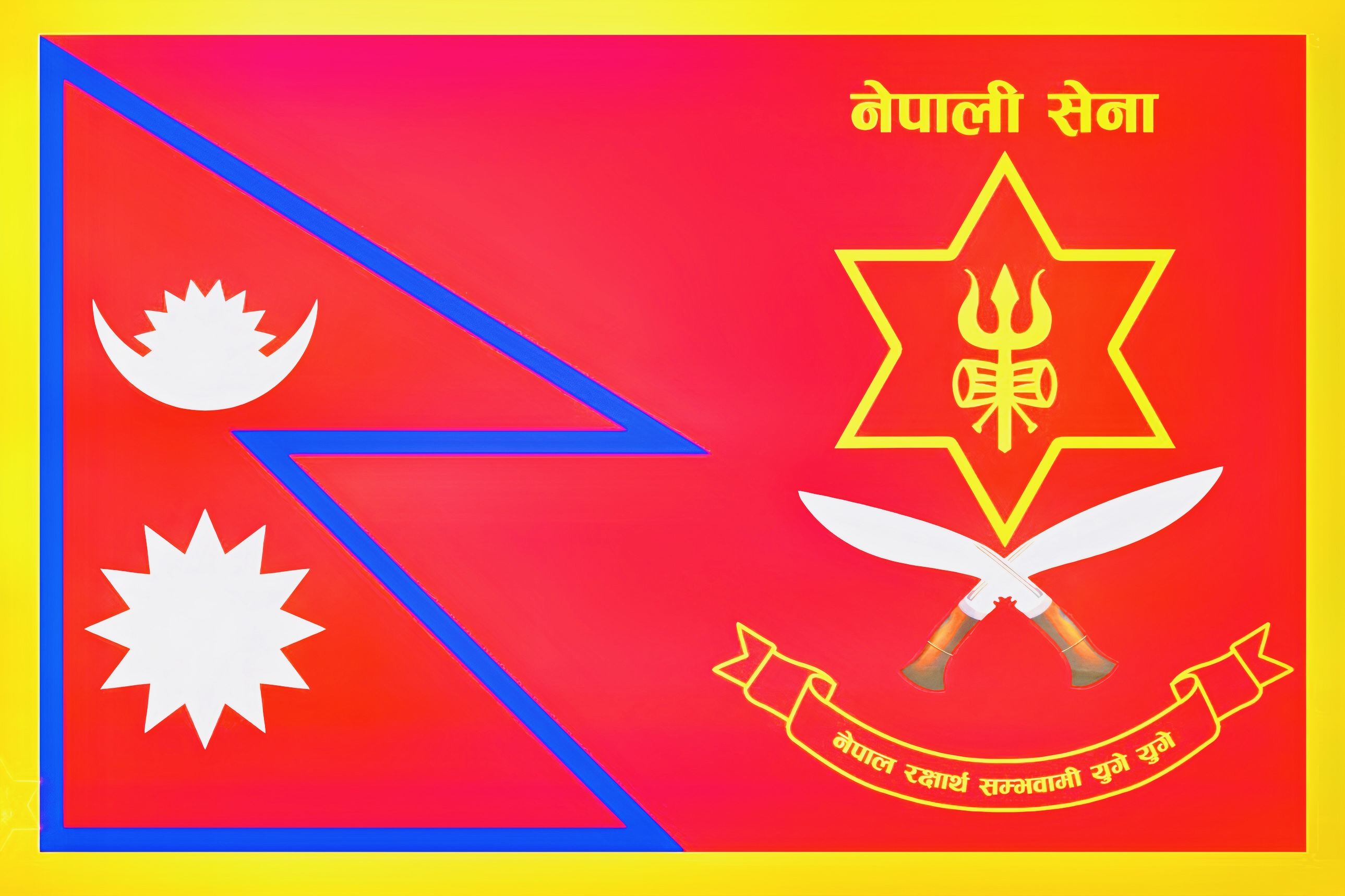
- Flag

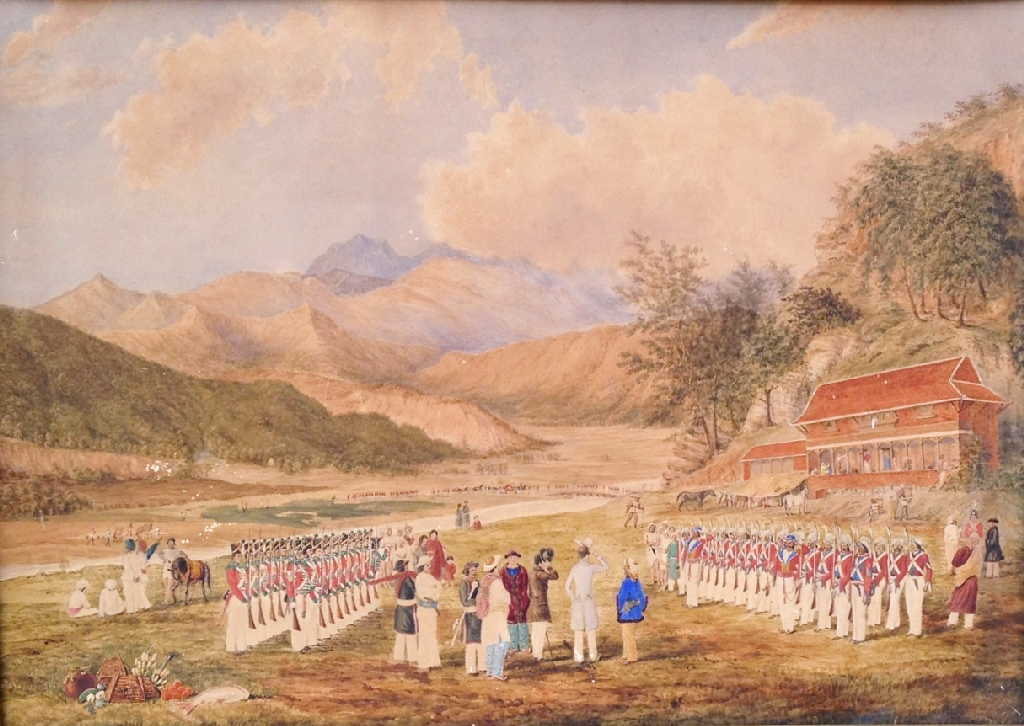
Nepalese troops (right) in 1816.

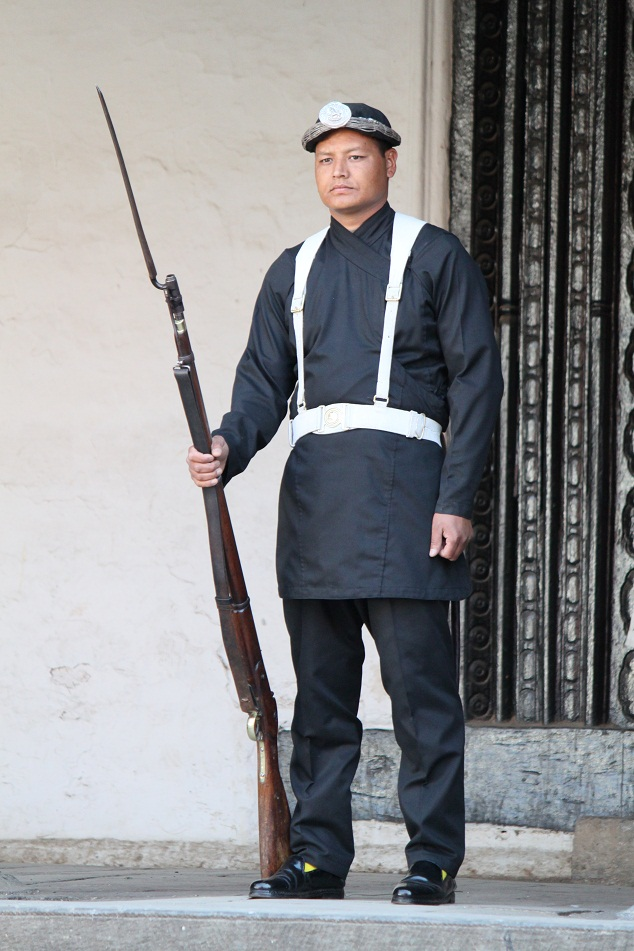
The Nepali Army’s Gurujyu Paltan, a ceremonial infantry company, in traditional uniform.

The Nepali Army (NA), (Note: Nepali: नेपाली सेना, romanized: Nepālī Senā) formerly known as the Royal Nepali Army, (Note: Nepali: शाही नेपाली सेना, romanized: Śāhī Nepālī Senā) is the land warfare branch of the Nepali Armed Forces. It traces its origins to 1559 with the establishment of the Gorkha Kingdom, where it was initially formed as the Gorkhali Army, (Note: Nepali: गोरखाली सेना, romanized: Gorkhālī Senā) a term historically associated with the Gurkhas.

It was known as the Royal Nepali Army (RNA) following the Unification of Nepal, when the Gorkha Kingdom expanded its territory to include the whole country, by conquering and annexing the other states in the region, resulting in the establishment of a single united Hindu monarchy over all of Nepal. It was officially renamed simply to the Nepali Army on 28 May 2008, upon the abolition of the 240-year-old Nepalese monarchy, and of the 449-year-old rule of the Shah dynasty, shortly after the end of the Maoist insurgency.

The Nepali Army has participated in various conflicts throughout its history, going as far back as the Nepali unification campaign launched by Prithvi Narayan Shah of the Gorkha Kingdom. It has engaged in an extensive number of battles within South Asia, and continues to take part in global conflicts as part of United Nations peacekeeping coalitions. The Nepali Army is headquartered in Kathmandu and the incumbent Chief of Army Staff is General Ashok Raj Sigdel.

== Nepalese Armed Forces ==
Roundel of Nepal

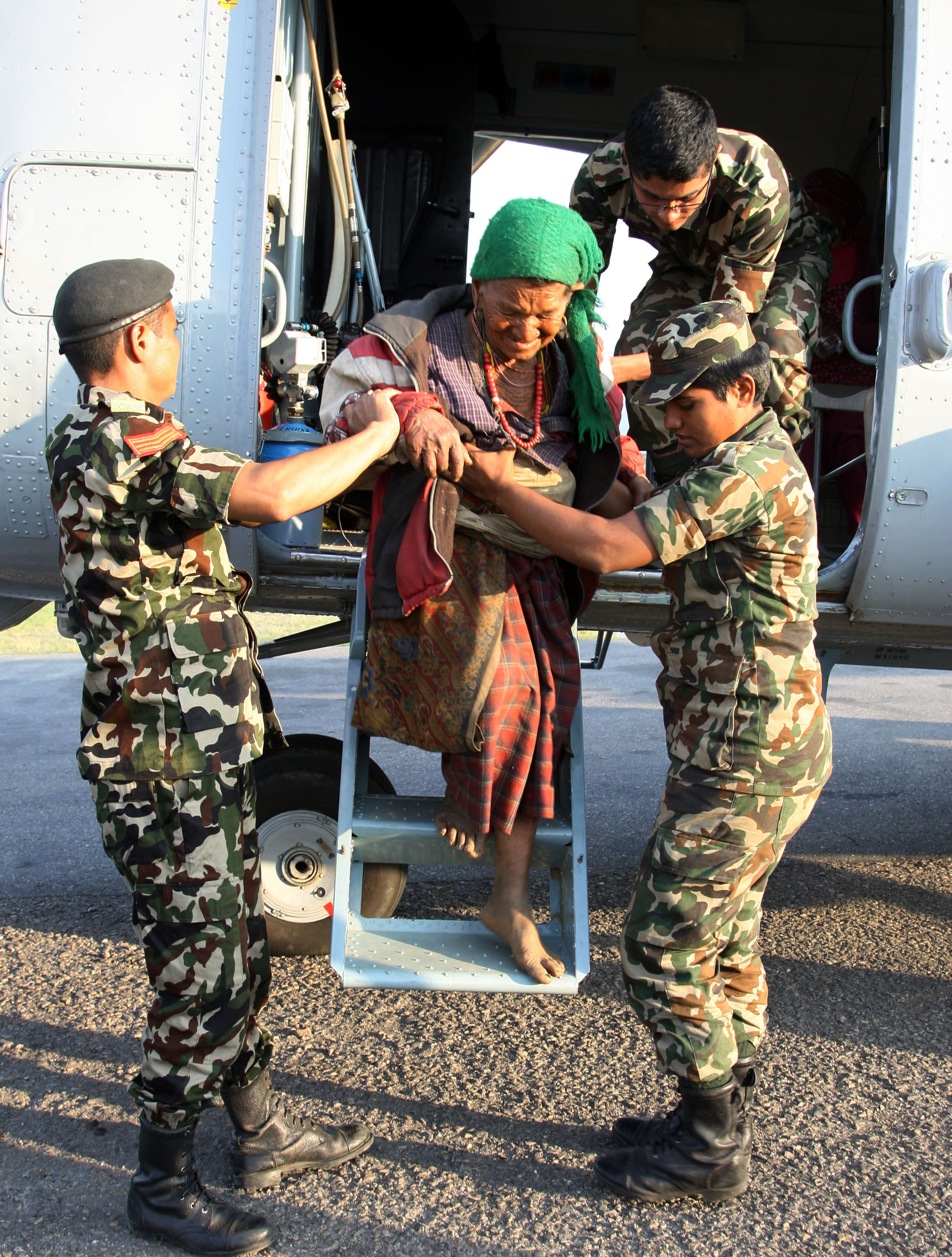
A rescued old woman being assisted by the Nepali Armed Forces personnel while alighting from a Mi-17 helicopter

The Nepali Armed Forces, also known as Nepalese Armed Forces, are the military forces of Nepal. Composed primarily of the ground-based Nepali Army, the Nepalese Armed Forces also operates the smaller Nepalese Army Air Service designed to support army operations and provide close light combat support.

=== Army pilot training school ===
The Nepal Army Air Service has operated a flying and helicopter pilot training school since 2004 within the 11 Brigade. It is the only helicopter pilot training school in Nepal (there is a fixed-wing pilot training school in Bharatpur by a private pilot training school). This school produces both army air service and civilian pilots. The school provides the Mil Mi-17, and Eurocopter Ecureuil helicopter flight training.

== History ==
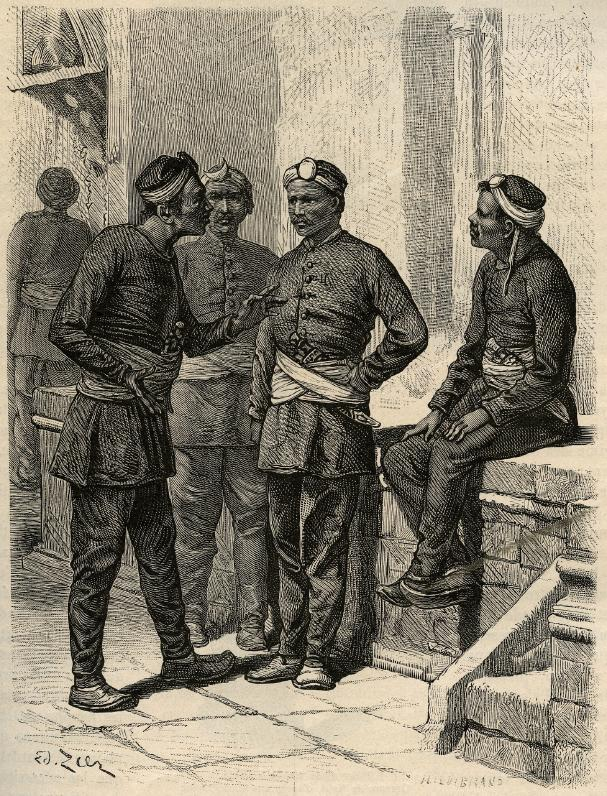
Nepali soldiers; drawing by Gustave Le Bon, 1885

The Nepal unification campaign was a turning point in the history of the Nepali army. Since unification was not possible without a strong army, the management of the armed forces had to be exceptional. Apart from the standard Malla-era temples in Kathmandu, the army organized itself in Gorkha. After the Gorkhali troops captured Nuwakot, the hilly northern part of Kathmandu (Kantipur) in 1744, the Gorkhali armed forces came to be known as the Royal Nepali Army.

Their performance impressed their enemies so much that the British East India Company started recruiting Nepali troops into their forces. British troops called the new soldiers "Gurkhas". The Nepal–Sikh war began shortly after, in 1809 and the Anglo-Nepalese War in 1814. It became even more involved in the British Indian Army until independence, remaining an independent entity (since it was a protected state of the British Raj until 1947, though The Crown had officially recognized its independence in 1923). In 1946, the Royal Nepali Army troops were led by Commanding General Baber Shamsher Jang Bahadur Rana at the Victory Parade in London.

Prior to 2006, the Royal Nepali Army was under the control of the King of Nepal. Following the 2006 Democracy Movement (Nepali: लोकतन्त्र आन्दोलन, romanized: Loktantra Āndolan) on 18 May, a bill was passed by the Nepali parliament curtailing royal power, which included renaming the army to simply the Nepali Army.Though during period of 2006 to 2008 ad, the Military was in awkard position with the mainstream parties, as military need them as politcal cover while the Mainstream parites need them to keep the maoist in check, in case the maoist betrayes the peace process.There was general distrust but also need of each side, as parites, were still fearful of army loyalty to King of Nepal. In 2004, Nepal spent $99.2 million on its military (1.5% of its GDP). Between 2002 and 2006, the RNA was involved in the Nepali Civil War. They were also used to quell pro-democracy protesters during the 2006 democracy movement.

== Organization ==
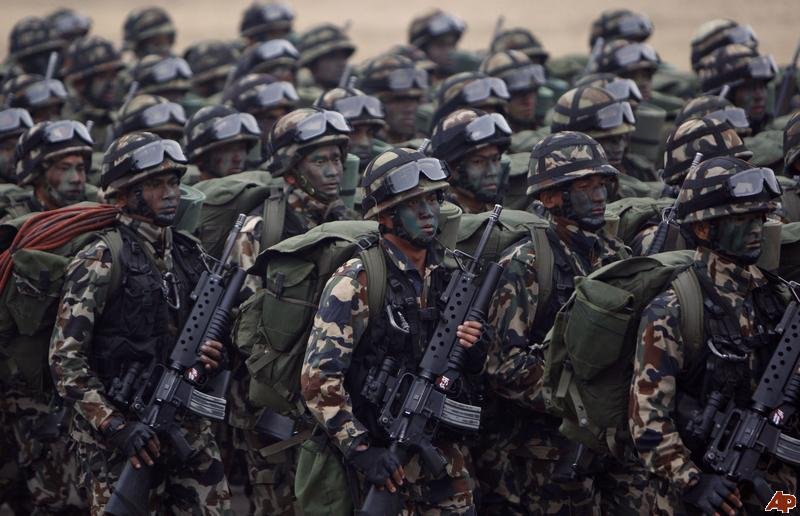
Nepali Army soldiers on Army Day

The Nepali Army has 96,500 infantry army and air service members protecting the sovereignty of Nepal. In August 2018, The Himalayan Times estimated total army forces to be around 96,000 while The Kathmandu Post estimated it to be 92,000.

=== Supreme Command ===
Article 144 of Interim Constitution of Nepal states that the President of Nepal is the Supreme Commander-in-Chief of Nepal Army. Currently as the President of Nepal Ram Chandra Poudel who assumed office on 13 March 2023, is the current supreme commander of Nepal Army.

Until 2006, the King of Nepal (monarchy abolished) was in control of all military forces in the country. The National Army was renamed from Royal Nepalese Army to Nepalese Army after the recent national change from a monarchy to its suspension, following 9 point proclamationon 4th Jestha 2063 B.S., following 2nd People movement(also known as Jana Andolan II, in Local terminology, in Nepal)

=== National Defence Council ===
Nepal's Interim Constitution's Article 145 has envisioned National Defence Council which includes Prime Minister, Defence Minister, Home Minister and other three minister appointed by Prime Minister which recommends to the Council of Ministers on mobilization, operation and use of the Nepal Army. Upon Council of Ministers recommendation, President authorizes mobilization, operation and use of Nepal Army.

Before the Interim Constitution replaced Constitution of Kingdom of Nepal in 1990, the 1990 constitution had a provision for the defense council. This Council used to have three members: the Prime Minister, the Defence Minister and the Chief of the Army Staff. In accordance with the Constitution, the King (as Supreme Commander) used to "operate and use" the "Royal Nepal Army on the recommendation" of this council.

=== Divisions ===
The Nepalese Army is divided into eight divisions, one each in the seven provinces and one in the Kathmandu Valley.

- Far western division
- Northwestern division
- Midwestern division
- Western division
- Mid-division
- Valley division
- Mideastern division
- Eastern division

| Names | Description |
|---|---|
| FAR WESTERN DIVISION | The Far Western Division Headquarters, with the motto, "Bhakti Nai Sakti Ho” was established on July 5, 2004 (Ashad 21, 2061) in scenic and beautiful land of Dipayal. The flag of this division was raised on May 1, 2005 (Baisakh 18, 2062). |
| NORTH WESTERN DIVISION | The North Western Division Headquarters, with the motto, "Sadaiba Samarpit Desh Prati” was established on 29th November 2001 (14th Mangsir, 2058) with the name of Western Division at Nepalgunj, Banke. The Western Division was renamed as Mid Western Division and was shifted to Tribhuvan Sainik Shivir, Surkhet on 23rd October 2005 (6th Kartik, 2062). The Mid Western Division has been once again re-organized and renamed as the North Western Division in Nimare Barrack, Surkhet on 16 July 2017(1st Shrawan, 2074). |
| MID-WESTERN DIVISION | with the motto, "AAGHI BADAU KARMA PATHMA” was established on 2017 (2074 BS) with the name of Mid-Western Division. |
| WESTERN DIVISION | The Western Division Headquarters, with the motto, "Rakshya Nai Dharma Ho” was established on February 13, 2003 (Falgun 1, 2059) as Central Division at Pokhara, Kaski. The Central Division was renamed to its present name as the Western Division on September 17, 2004. |
| MID-EASTERN DIVISION | with the motto, "PARAKRAM NAI SHAKTI” was established on May 12, 2017 (Baisakh 29, 2074) with the name of Mid-Western Division at Dharapani, Dhanusha. |
| MID DIVISION | The Mid Divisional Headquarters, with the motto, "Atal Bhakti Desh Prati” was established on November 16, 2004 (Marga 01, 2061) at Hetauda. |
| VALLEY DIVISION | The ‘Valley Command Office’, with the motto “Shanti Surakshya Sarbada”, was established on May 19, 2003 (2060 Jestha 5). Later it was renamed as “Valley Division HQ” on December 13, 2003 (2060 Poush 15). At the beginning, the division HQ was based at Singha Durbar, Kathmandu and later it was relocated to the Narayanhiti Palace. |
| EASTERN DIVISION | The Eastern Divisional Headquarters, with the motto "Rastra Rakshya Param Kartabya", was raised on January 29, 2003 (2059 Magh 15 B.S) at Itahari. |

In addition there are at least 7 independent units:

- Army Aviation Directorate
- Special Forces Brigade
- VVIP Security
- Artillery Brigade
- Signals Brigade
- Engineers Brigade
- Air Defense Brigade

=== Chiefs of the Nepali Army ===
During the Shah monarchy, leadership of the Nepali Army was mainly concentrated among a small number of aristocratic families within the broader Chhetri community of the late Gorkha Kingdom and early Kingdom of Nepal, such as the Pande, Kunwar, Basnyat, and Thapa clans, before the rise of the Rana regime. During the Rana regime, the Ranas made the position hereditary within their family.

The first chief of the Gorkhali and later Nepali army was King Prithvi Narayan Shah, who organized and commanded the army. The first non-royal army chief was Kalu Pande, a Mulkaji, who played a significant role in the Unification of Nepal campaigns.

Bhimsen Thapa, who served as the second Mukhtiyar of Nepal from 1806 to 1837, became the first person to formally hold the title of Commander-in-Chief as head of the Nepali army. King Rajendra Bikram Shah appointed him to the position in recognition of his long service to the nation. However, on 14 June 1837, the King assumed direct command of the battalions previously under various courtiers, and became the Commander-in-Chief.

Following the incarceration of the Thapa family in 1837, a new government was formed with Ranga Nath Poudyal as the Mukhtiyar, and Dalbhanjan Pande and Rana Jang Pande as joint heads of military administrations. Rana Jang Pande was removed from the position three months later in October 1837.

During Bhimsen Thapa’s tenure as Mukhtiyar, the title of Commander-in-Chief was introduced for the first time to formally designate the head of the army. In 1979, Singha Bahadur Basnyat changed the title to Chief of the Army Staff (CoAS). Since 1950, it has been a tradition for the President of India to confer the honorary rank of General of the Indian Army upon the chief of the Nepali Army, with similar gesture made from nepal, prior by King (in position of supreme commander in chief), and later by President of Nepal, after fall of monarchy.

== Operations ==
=== Conflicts defending the Kingdom of Nepal ===
- Battle against Mir Qasim (1763)
- Battle of Pauwa Gadhi against Captain Kinloch (1767)
- Anglo-Nepali War (1814–1816)
- Nepal-China War (1788–1792)
- Nepal-Tibet War (1855–1856)
- Nepali-Tibetan War
- Nepali Civil War (1996–2006)

==== Battle against Mir Qasim ====
The fortress of Makawanpur has a historical and military significance for the Nepali. It was here that the Nepali defeated superior forces of Mir Qasim in 1763 and seized 500 guns and two cannons. Later on, these weapons were used by Nepali troops and four companies were established regular, namely, Srinath, Kalibox, Barda Bahadur (Bardabahini) and Sabuj. (Purano) Gorakh Company was established a few months later. It was the first rank and file system beginning a proper organizational history for the Royal Nepali Army. The battle against Mir Qasim troops was the first battle of the Royal Nepali Army against a foreign power.

Sardar Nandu Shah was the fortress Commander of Makawanpur with 400 troops, some guns and home-made traditional weapons like Dhanu, Khukuri, Talwar, Ghuyatro etc. They devised different hit-and-run strategies to surprise the enemy. A spoiling attack base was set up on the Taplakhar mountain ridge for night operations.

Mir Qasim's renowned warrior, Gurgin Khan was the commander on the other side with approximately 2,500 troops with cannons, guns, ammunition and a very good logistics back up. Their attack base was at the bottom of the Makawanpur Gadhi hill. They had planned a night attack. When the enemy's heavy forces marched in December 1762 and arrived at Harnamadi in January 1763, they found all the local houses already evacuated and the area short of food provisions. Makawanpur Gadhi was on top of a mountain, about nine kilometers uphill from the Harnamadi area. Although the Nepali had physically occupied all the fortresses en route, the enemy was able to initially push them back to the Makawanpur Gadhi area.

About 300 enemy launched a strong attack on 20 January 1763 putting the Nepali still more on the defensive. But they were totally surprised when they were resting in Taplakhar, as Kaji Vamsharaj Pande led a downhill attack on them Kaju Naharsigh Basnyat led an uphill attack from below them and Nandu Shah led a frontal attack. The smooth coordination among the three, leading their, by now battle-hardened, troops in the dark of the night, led the bewildered enemy to scatter. About 1700 of them died and 30 Nepali soldiers were lost in that battle. The Nepali captured 500 rifles and two cannons with other military equipment. More importantly, the battle led to the beginning of a proper organization of the Royal Nepali Army.

==== Disarmament of the Khampas ====
In 1974, The Royal Nepali Army (RNA) was mobilized to disarm the Tibetan Khampas who had been using Nepali soil to engage guerilla war against the Chinese forces. The Khampas had secretly created their base in Mustang (north-west Nepal) and were operating from there against China. The RNA, under immense diplomatic pressure from China and the international community, moved nine infantry units towards the Khampa post in Mustang and gave them an ultimatum to either disarm themselves and surrender, or face consequences. The terms and conditions of their surrender was that they would be given Nepali citizenship, land, and some money. The Khampa commander Wang Di agreed to surrender but eventually fled the camp. He was later killed in Doti, far-western Nepal by RNA forces while trying to loot a Nepal Police post. This was first time that the RNA was mobilized in such a large number domestically.

=== Battles during the unification of Nepal ===
The Nepali army fought various battles on the national unification campaigns of the 18th century. These battles of Nepal unification helped the Royal Nepali army to gain more experience while helping to unify Nepal.

- Battle of Kirtipur
- Battle of Kathmandu
- Battle of Bhaktapur
- Limbuwan–Gorkha War
- Invasion of Doti Kingdom

=== International conflicts ===
- Indian Sepoy Mutiny
- World War I (Casualties)
- Afghan War (1919)
- Royal Nepal Army in Waziristhan War
- World War II
- Hyderabad Action (1948)

=== International operations ===
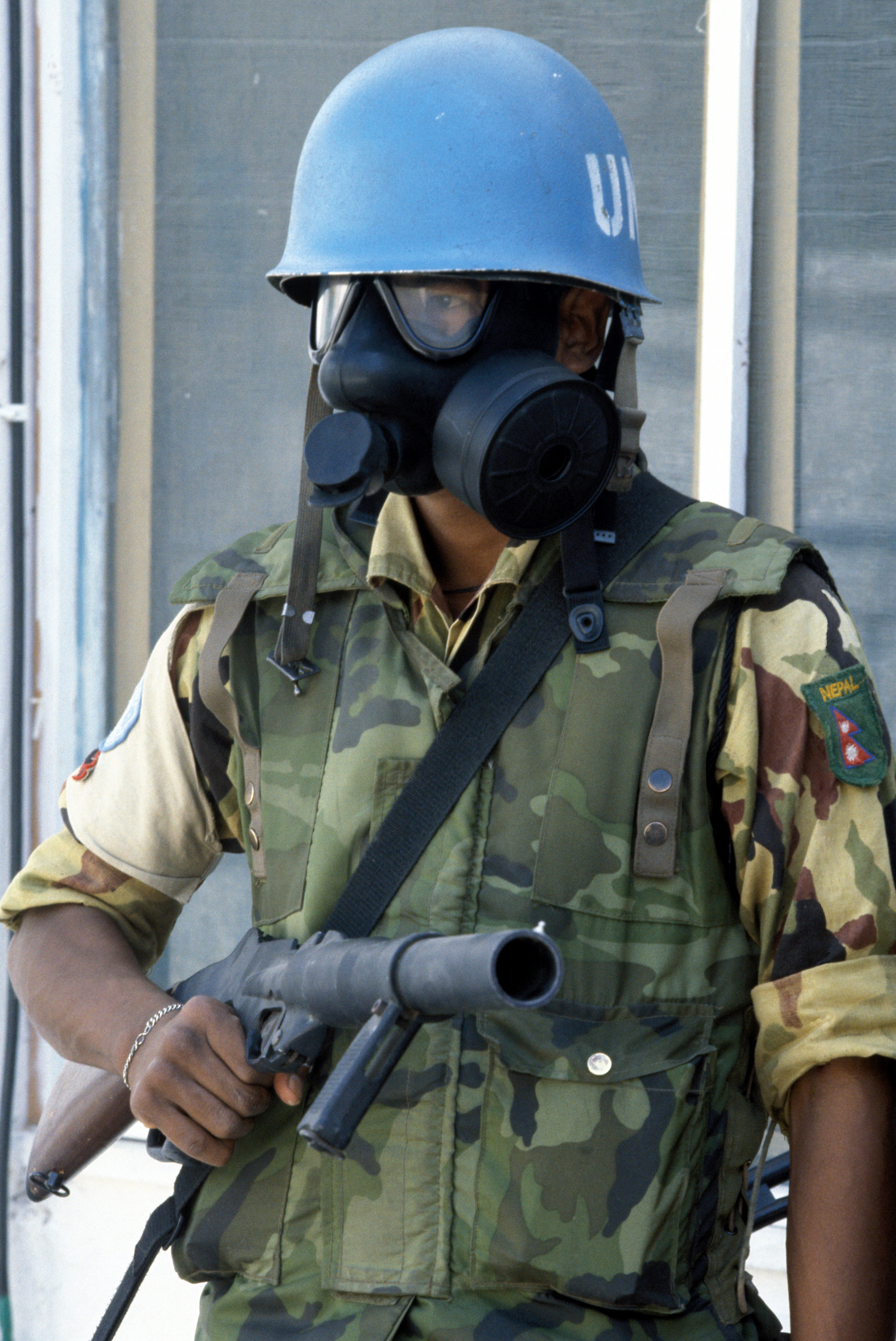
A Nepali UN peacekeeper

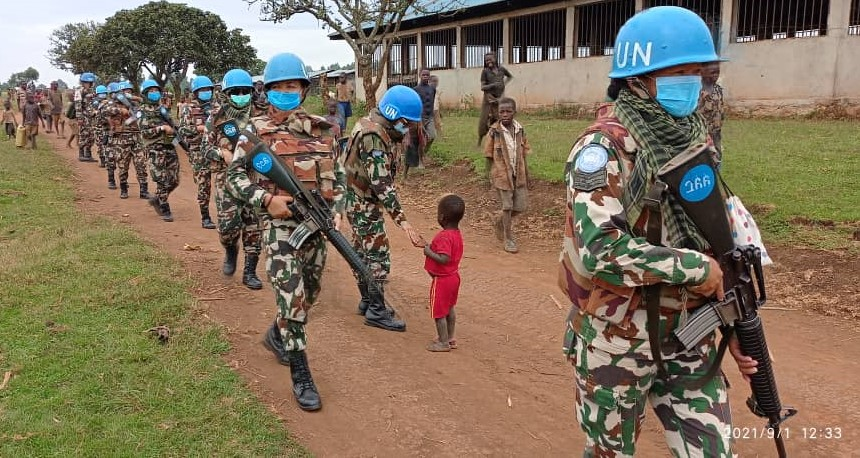
Women peacekeepers from MONUSCO's Nepali Battalion in Djugu in 2021

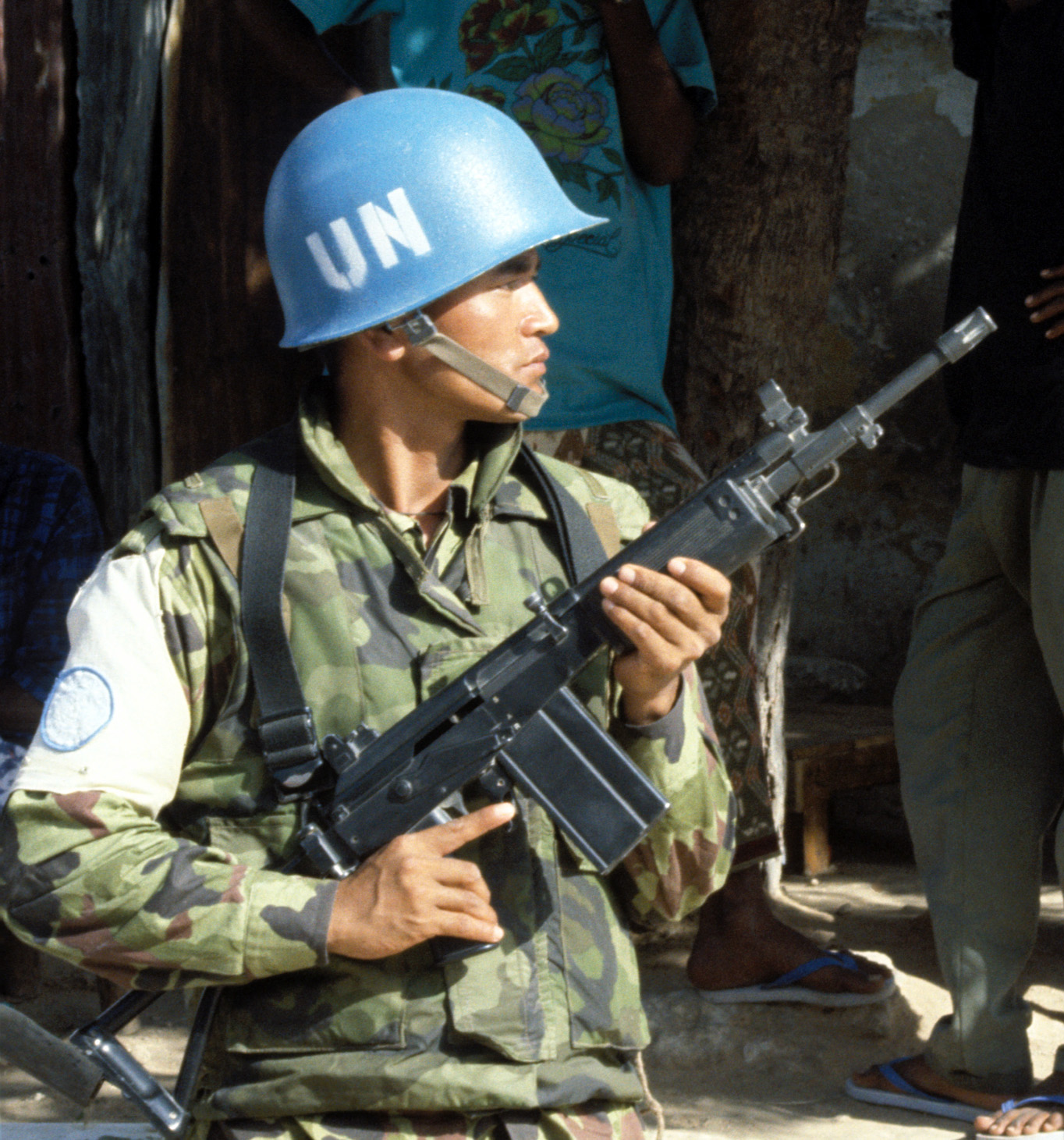
A member of the Nepali Quick Reactionary Force (QRF) stands ready with a variant of the IMI Galil.

Nepal Army's long association with UN Peace Support Operations began with the deployment of five Military Observers in the Middle East, Lebanon (UNOGIL/ United Nations Observation Group in Lebanon) in 1958. And the first Nepali contingent, Purano Gorakh battalion was deployed in Egypt in 1974. Nepal's participation in the UN peacekeeping operations spans a period of 50 years covering 42 Nepal army-involved UN Missions, the latest being UNSMIL in Libya, in which over 60,652 Nepali soldiers have served in support of UN peacekeeping endeavors. The Nepal Army has contributed Force Commanders, military contingents, military observers, and staff officers. Nepali troops have taken part in some of the most difficult operations, and have suffered casualties in the service of the UN. To date, the number of those lost on duty with the UN is 74, while 77 were seriously wounded.

Its most significant contribution has been of ensuring peace and stability in Africa. It has demonstrated its capacity of sustaining large troop commitments over prolonged periods. Presently, Nepal is ranked as the second largest troop-contributing country (TCC) to the UN.

The Nepali Army has contributed more than 100,000 peacekeepers to a variety of United Nations-sponsored peacekeeping missions such as:

- United Nations Interim Force in Lebanon (UNIFIL),
- UNOSOMII the United Nations Protection Force (UNPROFOR), UN Operational Mission Somalia II,
- MINUSTAH the United Nations Mission in Haiti,
- UNAMSIL – an 800-man battalion was sent to serve in the peacekeeping mission in Sierra Leone,
- UNMIS – The Nepali Army sent a protection company of 200 personnel for the United Nations Mission In Sudan. The Redeployment Coordination Headquarters (RCHQ) at Kassala was also manned by the Nepali contingent. The RCHQ was intended to monitor withdrawals from the eastern sectors of the UNMIS area under the Sudan Comprehensive Peace Accord.
- UNMISET – The UN mission in Timor Leste (East Timor)
- RCHQ – The RCHQ, KASSALA is also manned by Nepali forces.
- UNDOF
- MINUSMA – For the first time, the Nepali Army sent an EOD company of 140 personnel specially dedicated to the improvised explosive device (IED) and ordnance disposal mission in Mali.

=== US-Nepal military relations ===
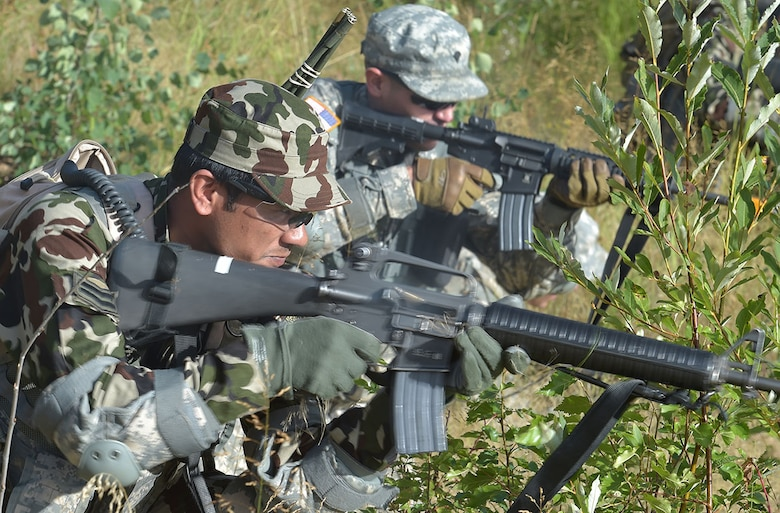
Mahabir Ranger with a U.S. soldier

The US-Nepali military relationship focuses on support for democratic institutions, civilian control of the military, and the professional military ethic. Both countries have had extensive contact over the years. Nepali Army units have served with distinction alongside American forces in places such as Haiti, Iraq, and Somalia.

US-Nepali military engagement continues today through the International Military Education and Training (IMET) program, Enhanced International Peacekeeping Capabilities (EIPC) program, Global Peace Operations Initiative (GPOI), and various conferences and seminars. The US military sends many Nepali Army officers to America to attend military schools, such as the Command and General Staff College and the US Army War College. The IMET budget for FY2001 was $220,000.

The EIPC program is an inter-agency program between the US Department of Defense and US Department of State to increase the pool of international peacekeepers and to promote interoperability. Nepal received about $1.9 million in EIPC funding.

The US Commander in Chief, Pacific Command (CINCPAC) coordinates military engagement with Nepal through the Office of Defense Cooperation (ODC). The ODC Nepal is located in the American Embassy in Kathmandu.

=== India-Nepal military relations ===
India has agreed to resume military aid to Nepal. The aid was in the pipeline before India imposed an embargo in February 2005 following the seizure of power by the then King Gyanendra.Since 1950, the Chief of the Army Staff of Nepal is also awarded the honorary Chief of the Army Staff of India and vice -versa in recognition of the mutual harmonious relationship between the two armies of different countries.

=== China-Nepal military relations ===
In 2009, People's Republic of China pledged military aid worth Rs100 million to Nepal.

== Units ==
Most units in the Nepali Army are named after Hindu deities. The prefix Shree (श्री) is an honorific title placed before their names to express respect and dignity.

Five military units were established during the reign of King Prithivi Narayan Shah in the Gorkha Kingdom, before the unification of Nepal in 1768. These units primarily recruited soldiers from Gorkha's dominant communities, including Gurung, Magar, Chhetri, Bahun, and Thakuri. They formed the core of the Gorkha military's infantry and command structure during the unification campaigns. Following the establishment of the Kingdom of Nepal, military recruitment expanded to include other communities.

=== List of units ===
The following is a list of military units established during Gorkha Kingdom and after the establishment of the Kingdom of Nepal.

Formed during Gorkha
Formed during Nepal

| No. | Name | Flag | Establishment (AD) and (BS) | Headquarters | Role and Historical Significance |
|---|---|---|---|---|---|
| 1 | Shree Shreenath | | 17 September 1762 AD (5 Ashwin 1819 BS) | Mahendranagar Barracks in Mahendranagar, Dhanusha District | |
| 2 | Shree Barda Bahadur | | 21 September 1762 AD (9 Ashwin 1819 BS) | Thulitar Barracks in Sindhuli District | |
| 3 | Shree Sabuj | | 21 September 1762 AD (9 Ashwin 1819 BS) | Simkharka Barracks in Salyan District | |
| 4 | Shree Purano Gorakh | | 18 February 1763 AD (10 Falgun 1819 BS) | Kathmandu District | |
| 5 | Shree Kali Baksh | | | Surkhet District | |
| 6 | Shree Ranabhim | | 10 April 1785 AD (1 Baishakh 1842 BS) | | |
| 7 | Shree Shreejung | | 10 April 1785 AD (1 Baishakh 1842 BS) | | |
| 8 | Shree Devidutta | | 23 April 1785 AD (14 Baishakh 1842 BS) | | |
| 9 | Shree Naya Shreenath | | 19 September 1785 AD (7 Ashwin 1842 BS) | | |
| 10 | Shree Durgabuksh | | 27 August 1786 AD (15 Bhadra 1843 BS) | | |
| 11 | Shree Barakh | | 27 January 1786 AD (17 Magh 1842 BS) | | |
| 12 | Shree Bhawanibuksh | | 12 September 1784 AD (1 Ashwin 1841 BS) | | |
| 13 | Shree Jwaladal | | 17 April 1785 AD (8 Baishakh 1842 BS) | | |
| 14 | Shree Bhairavidal | | 2 May 1785 AD (23 Baishakh 1842 BS) | | |
| 15 | Shree Taradal | | 21 June 1785 AD (11 Ashadh 1842 BS) | | |
| 16 | Shree Batukdal | | 10 July 1785 AD (30 Ashadh 1842 BS) | | |
| 17 | Shree Bhawanidal | | 25 August 1785 AD (13 Bhadra 1842 BS) | | |
| 18 | Shree Ranashardul | | 20 September 1785 AD (8 Ashwin 1842 BS) | | |
| 19 | Shree Singhanath | | 5 March 1786 AD (25 Falgun 1842 BS) | | |
| 20 | Shree Bhairav | | 1842 (BS) | | |
| 21 | Shree Ranabam | | 1847 (BS) | | |
| 22 | Shree Ranasher | | 18 June 1788 AD (8 Ashadh 1845 BS) | | |
| 23 | Shree Jabarjung | | 15 May 1791 AD (5 Jestha 1848 BS) | | |
| 24 | Shree Naya Gorakh | | 19 January 1792 AD (9 Magh 1848 BS) | | |
| 25 | Shree Rajdal | | | | |
| 26 | Shree Indrabaksh | | 1848 (BS) | | |
| 27 | Shres Siddhibaksh | | 1848 (BS) | | |
| 28 | Shree Bhagwatidal | | 1850 (BS) | | |
| 29 | Shree Shivadal | | 3 January 1799 AD (23 Poush 1855 BS) | | |
| 30 | Shree Ranasinghadal | | 14 August 1804 AD (1 Bhadra 1861 BS) | | |
| 31 | Shree Birdal | | 12 October 1804 AD (29 Ashwin 1861 BS) | | |
| 32 | Shree Narsinghadal | | 20 January 1805 AD (10 Magh 1861 BS) | | |
| 33 | Shree Kalijung | | 1861 (BS) | | |
| 34 | Shree Ahridaman | | 12 February 1805 AD (3 Falgun 1861 BS) | | |
| 35 | Shree Indradhwaj | | 1861 (BS) | | |
| 36 | Shree Sher | | 7 January 1806 AD (6 Poush 1862 BS) | | |
| 37 | Shree Yuddha Bhairav | | 1873 (BS) | | |
| 38 | Shree Bajradal | | 1873 (BS) | | |
| 39 | Shree Bhimdal | | 1873 (BS) | | |
| 40 | Shree Arjunbal | | 1873 (BS) | | |
| 41 | Shree Krishnadal | | 1873 (BS) | | |
| 42 | Shree Naya Sabuj | | 1873 (BS) | | |
| 43 | Shree Nandabaksh | | 16 July 1806 AD (3 Shrawan 1863 BS) | | |
| 44 | Shree Chandidal | | 1863 (BS) | | |
| 45 | Shree Bhairavnath | | 26 August 1810 AD (12 Bhadra 1867 BS) | | |
| 46 | Shree Ripumardan | | 1867 (BS) | | |
| 47 | Shree Suryadal | | 21 June 1815 AD (9 Ashadh 1872 BS) | | |
| 48 | Shree Narayandal | | | | |
| 49 | Shree Shumsherdal | | | | |
| 50 | Shree Mahendradal | | | | |
| 51 | First Rifle | | | | |
| 52 | Nepal Cavalry | | | | |
| 53 | Shree Rudradhwaj | | | | |
| 54 | Shree Kalidhwaj | | | | |
| 55 | Shree Bishnudhwaj | | | | |
| 56 | Shree Gorakhnath | | | | |
| 57 | Shree Kali Bahadur | | | | |
| 58 | Shree Garudadal | | | | |
| 59 | Shree Gorkhdal | | | | |
| 60 | Shree Chandidal Prasad | | | | |
| 61 | Shree Bhairav Prasad | | | | |
| 62 | Shree Pashupati Prasad | | | | |
| 63 | Shree Gorkh Bahadur | | | | |
| 64 | Shree No. 1 Garrison Yuddha Kavach | | | | |
| 65 | Shree No. 2 Garrison Mahabir | | | | |
| 66 | Shree Shreemehar | | | | |
| 67 | Shree No. 1 Bipad Byabasthapan (Disaster Management) | | | | |
| 68 | Shree No. 2 Bipad Byabasthapan (Disaster Management) | | | | |
| 70 | Shree Ganeshdal | | | | |
| 71 | Shree Durga Bhanjan | | | | |
| 72 | Shree Kali Prasad | | | | |
| 73 | Shree Bhagvati Prasad | | | | |
| 74 | Shree Parshwavarti | | | | |
| 75 | Shree Jagadal | | | | |
| 76 | Shree Chandan Nath | | | | |
| 77 | Shri Ramban | | | | |

== Schools ==
- Nepalese Army Command and Staff College, Shivapuri
- Nepalese Army War College, Nagarkot
- Nepalese Military Academy, Kharipati
- Nepalese Army Recruit Training Center, Trishuli
- Nepalese Army Jungle Warfare School, Amlekhgunj
- Nepalese Army High Altitude and Mountain Warfare School, Mustang
- Nepalese Army Intelligence School, Kharipati
- Nepalese Army Logistics School, Chhauni
- Birendra Peace Keeping Operation Training Center, Panchkhal
- Nepalese Army Para Training School, Maharajgunj
- Nepalese Army EME school, Kharipati

== Female participation ==
The unofficial participation of women in Nepal Army was first during the Anglo-Nepalese War on Battle of Nalapani. Battle of Nalapani was the first battle of the Anglo-Nepalese War of 1814–1816, fought between the forces of the British East India Company and Nepal, then ruled by the Gorkha Kingdom. Nepalese women were heavily involved in this battle supporting the male Gurkha warriors. With no firearms in hand, Nepalese women fought British troops with stones and wood.

According to the Nepal Army YouTube channel programme Nepali Senama Mahila Sahabhagita (documentary) - Episode 405, the official participation of women in the Nepal Army started in 1961 in the post of Nurse. Now the regular forces also include a significant number of female soldiers holding key appointments and commands. The timeline of official women's participation in the Nepal Army is as follow:

- 1961 - Nurses
- 1965 - Parachute folding women team
- 1969 - Medical doctors
- 1998 - Lawyers
- 2004 - Engineering
- 2011 - Aviation

As of 2019 there were 3758 female Junior Commission, Non-Commission Officers and other ranks in general service and 907 in technical service. There were also 183 female officers in the general service and 214 female technical officers.

=== Notable female officers of the Nepali Army ===
- Brigadier General Dr. Radha (Shah) K.C. – First female to become Colonel and later Brigadier General.
- Brigadier General Dr. Narbada Thapa – First female personnel to get doctorate degree (P.Hd).
- Brigadier General Dr. Sarita K.C. – First female personnel to join UN Peacekeeping mission (UNIFIL).
- Colonel Sovana Rayamajhi – First female officer (Computer Engineer) to join the Information Technology Department.
- Colonel Yvetta Rana – First woman officer of Judge Advocate General Department.
- Major Kriti Rajbhandari – First woman observer military liaison officer.
- Major Niru Dhungana – One of the first female military pilots.
- Major Anita Ale Magar – One of the first female military pilots.
- Major Shristi Khadka – One of the first woman company commanders.

== Equipments ==
The majority of equipment used by the army is imported from other countries. India is the army's largest supplier of arms and ammunition as well as other logistical equipment, which are often furnished under generous military grants. Germany, the United States, Belgium, Israel, and South Korea have also either supplied or offered arms to the Nepali Army.

The army's first standard rifle was the Belgian FN FAL, which it adopted in 1960. Nepali FALs were later complemented by unlicensed, Indian-manufactured variants of the same weapon, as well its British counterpart, the L1A1 Self-Loading Rifle. Beginning in 2002 these were officially supplemented in army service by the American M-16 rifle, which took the FAL's place as the army's standard service rifle. Nevertheless, the FAL and its respective variants remain the single most prolific weapon in Nepali army service, with thousands of second-hand examples being supplied by India as late as 2005.

=== Small arms ===
| Weapon | Image | Origin | Type | Calibre | Notes |
Pistols
| Browning Hi-Power | | Belgium United States | Semi-automatic pistol | 9×19mm Parabellum | FN P-35 variant. |
Submachine guns
| Heckler & Koch MP5 | | West Germany | Submachine gun | 9×19mm Parabellum | |
| Sten | | United Kingdom | Submachine gun | 9×19mm Parabellum | |
| Sterling | | United Kingdom | Submachine gun | 9×19mm Parabellum | |
| Uzi | | Israel | Submachine gun | 9×19mm Parabellum | |
Rifles and Carbines
| INSAS | | India | Assault rifle | 5.56×45mm | The Nepali Army had about 25,000 INSAS rifles in 2006. |
| Heckler & Koch G36 | | Germany | Assault rifle | 5.56×45mm | |
| M16 | | United States | Assault rifle | 5.56×45mm | Standard service rifle of the Nepali Army. |
| CAR-15 | | United States | Carbine | 5.56×45mm | |
| M4 carbine | | United States | Carbine | 5.56×45mm | |
| Daewoo K2 | | South Korea | Assault rifle | 5.56×45mm | |
| IWI Galil | | Israel | Assault rifle | 5.56×45mm | |
| IWI Tavor | | Israel | Assault rifle | 5.56×45mm | Used by Army Special Forces, Ranger Battalion. |
| IWI Tavor X95 | | Israel | Assault rifle | 5.56×45mm | Used by Army Special Forces, Ranger Battalion. Often seen with GL40 UBGL, shown to be OTB compatible. |
| Norinco CQ | | China | Assault rifle | 5.56×45mm | closed quarter Assault Rifles |
| IWI Galil ACE | | Israel | Assault rifle | 7.62×39mm | Limited use by Military Police. |
| AKM | | Soviet Union | Assault rifle | 7.62×39mm | Confiscated from Maoist guerrillas during insurgency. |
| Type 56 | | China | Assault rifle | 7.62×39mm | 300 purchased from China in 2010. |
| L1A1 SLR | | United Kingdom | Battle rifle | 7.62×51mm | Unlicensed Indian variant designated 1A1. |
| FN FAL | | Belgium | Battle rifle | 7.62×51mm | |
| Heckler & Koch PSG1 | | West Germany / Germany | Sniper rifle | 7.62×51mm | |
| Ishapore 2A1 | | India | Bolt-action rifle | 7.62×51mm | Indian licensed copy of the No. III Enfield, modified for use with 7.62 NATO. New production action and barrel, recycled buttstock from No. III Enfields. |
Machine guns
| FN Minimi | | Belgium | Light machine gun | 5.56×45mm | 5,500 purchased from Belgium in 2002. Principal LMG/SAW |
| M249 | | Belgium United States | Light machine gun | 5.56×45mm | 300 supplied as military aid from the US. Functionally identical to FN Minimi |
| Bren L4A4 | | First Czechoslovak Republic (design); United Kingdom | Light machine gun | 7.62×51mm | Used in outposts and basic automatic fire training |
| FN MAG | | Belgium | General-purpose machine gun | 7.62×51mm | Principal GPMG, used on vehicle mounts. |
| W85 heavy machine gun | | China | Heavy machine gun | 12.7×108mm | fitted on several of the Army's armoured vehicles and armoured cars |

=== Heavy weapons ===
| Weapon | Image | Origin | Type | Calibre | Notes |
Air defence
| Bofors L/70 | | Sweden | Anti-aircraft gun | 40mm | |
| QF 3.7-inch AA gun | | United Kingdom | Anti-aircraft gun | 94mm | 45 in service. |
Artillery
| OTO Melara Mod 56 | | Italy | Pack howitzer | 105mm | 14 in service. |
Mortar
| 120-PM-43 | | Soviet Union | Mortar | 120mm | 70 in service |
| M 29 | | United States | Mortar | 81mm | |

=== Vehicles ===
| Vehicle | Image | Origin | Type | Quantity | Notes |
Armoured cars
| Daimler Ferret | | United Kingdom | Scout car | 85 | Ferret Mk4 variant. |
Armoured personnel carriers
| Casspir | | South Africa | MRAP | 37 | |
| Aditya | | India | MRAP | ~500 | |
| VN-4 | | China | MRAP | 63 | |
| OT-64 | | Czechoslovakia | Armoured personnel carrier | 8 | |
| WZ551 | | China | Infantry fighting vehicle | 175 | Acquired from China in 2005. |

Gaz2975. Russia. 350

== Rank structure ==
=== Commissioned officers ===
| Rank group | General / flag officers | | | | Senior officers | | | Junior officers |
|---|---|---|---|---|---|---|---|---|---|---|
| Nepali Army |
| Nepali Army | महारथी (प्रधानसेनापती); Mahārathī (pradhānasēnāpatī) | रथी Rathī | उपरथी Uparathī | सहायक रथी Sahaayak rathee | महासेनानी Mahāsēnānī | प्रमुख सेनानी Pramukh senaanee | सेनानी Senaanee | सहसेनानी Sahasēnānī | उपसेनानी Upasēnānī | सहायक सेनानी Sahaayak senaanee |
| Nepali Army | COAS General | Lieutenant general | Major general | Brigadier general | Colonel | Lieutenant colonel | Major | Captain | Lieutenant | Second lieutenant |

=== Other ranks ===
| Rank group | Senior NCOs | | | | Junior NCOs | | Enlisted |
|---|---|---|---|---|---|---|---|---|
| Nepali Army | | | | | | | No insignia | No insignia |
| Nepali Army | प्रमुख सुवेदार; Pramukh Suvēdār | सुवेदार; Suvēdār | जमदार; Jamadār | हुद्दा Huddā | अमल्दार; Amaldār | प्यूठ; Piyuth | सिपाही Sipahi | फलोअर्स; Phaloars |
| Nepali Army | Chief warrant officer | Warrant officer first class | Warrant officer second class | Sergeant | Corporal | Lance corporal | Private | Followers |

== Emblem ==
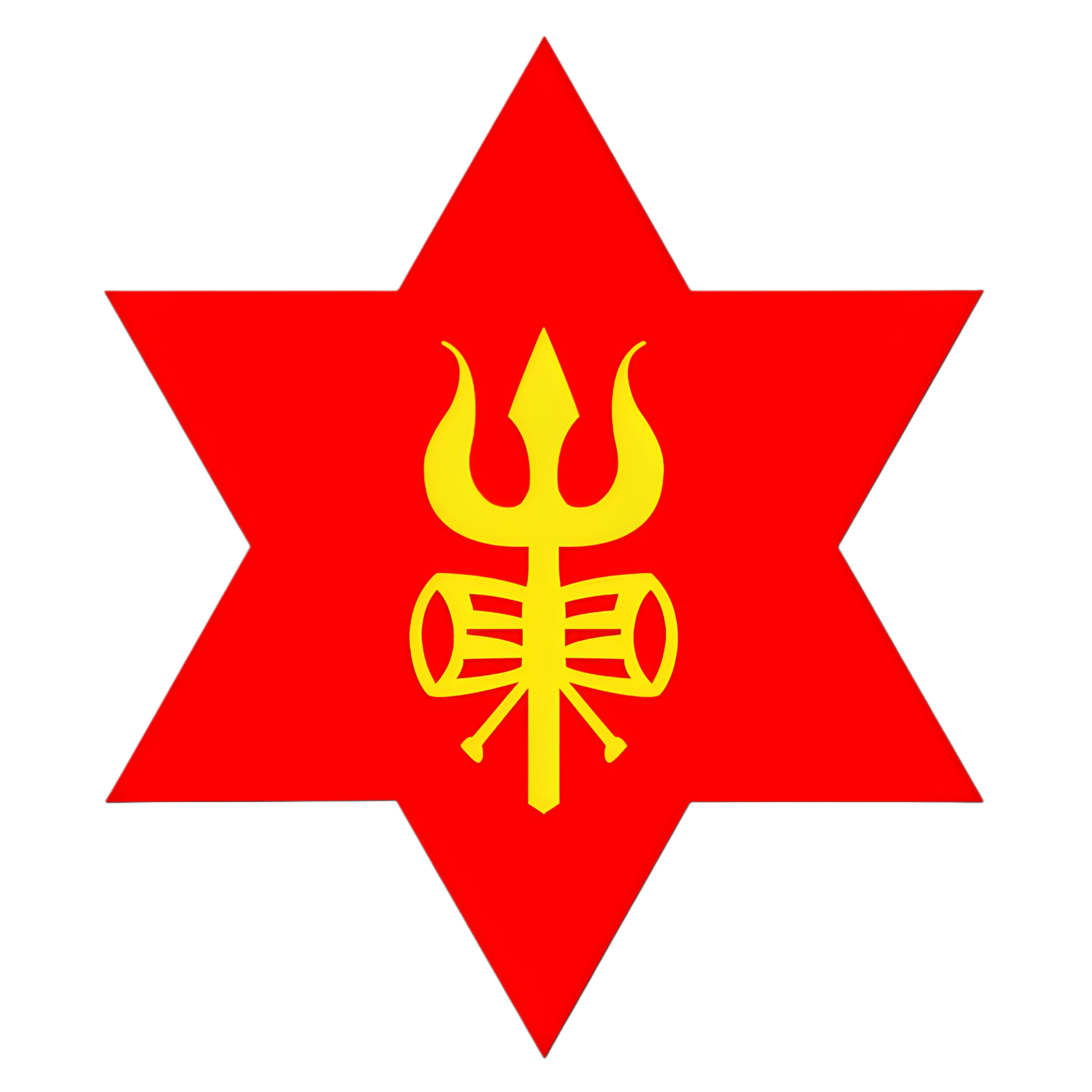
The emblem of the Nepali Army

=== Shape of the emblem ===
The emblem of the Nepali Army is centered on a bold red Shatkona, formed by two interlocking triangles, one pointing upward and the other downward, representing the eternal union of Shiva and Shakti, indicating total awareness, protection, and presence in all dimensions. The upward triangle symbolizes Shiva: pure consciousness, discipline, transcendence, and the element of fire, while the downward triangle represents Shakti: creation, nature, manifestation, and the element of water. Together, they express the harmony and balance of opposing yet complementary forces.

Shatkona

=== Red colour ===
The Shatkona is rendered in vivid red colour, symbolizing power (Shakti), sacrifice, and the blood shed in defense of the nation. In Hinduism, red also represents divine energy, reinforcing the presence of Shakti and the dynamic force that sustains and protects.

=== Central symbol ===
At the center of the Shatkona is a golden depiction of Shiva's attributes: the Trishul (weapon) and the Damaru (musical instrument).

- The Trishul stands vertically as the central axis, symbolizing willpower (iccha-shakti), action (kriyā), and knowledge (jñāna), as well as control over creation, preservation, and destruction. Its upright form conveys authority, discipline, and command.
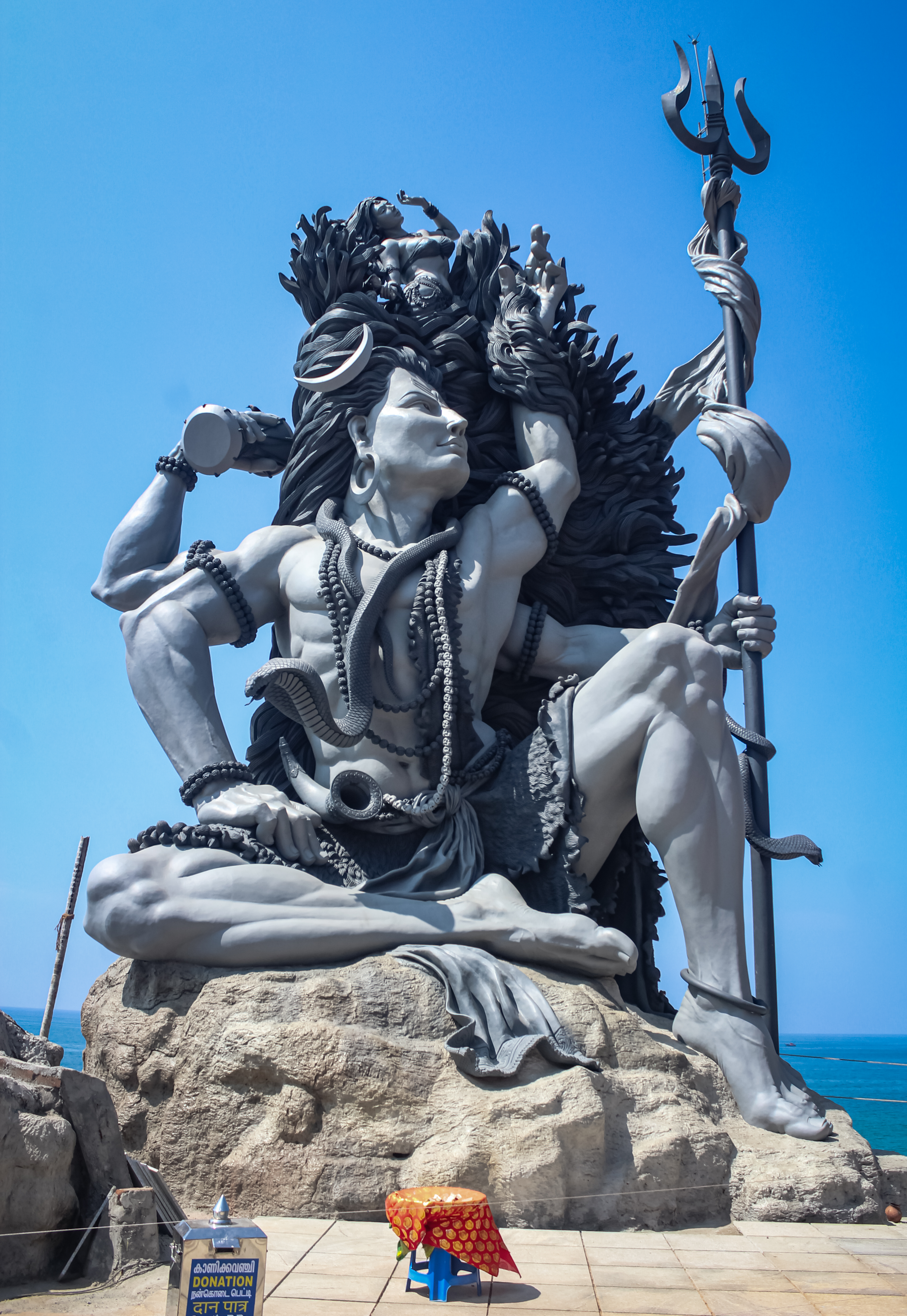
  Shiva with his Trishul
- The Damaru is placed horizontally across the Trishul, representing the primordial sound, the very first cosmic vibration that existed at the beginning of the universe. It signifies rhythm, timing, and coordination, essential to both cosmic order and military structure.

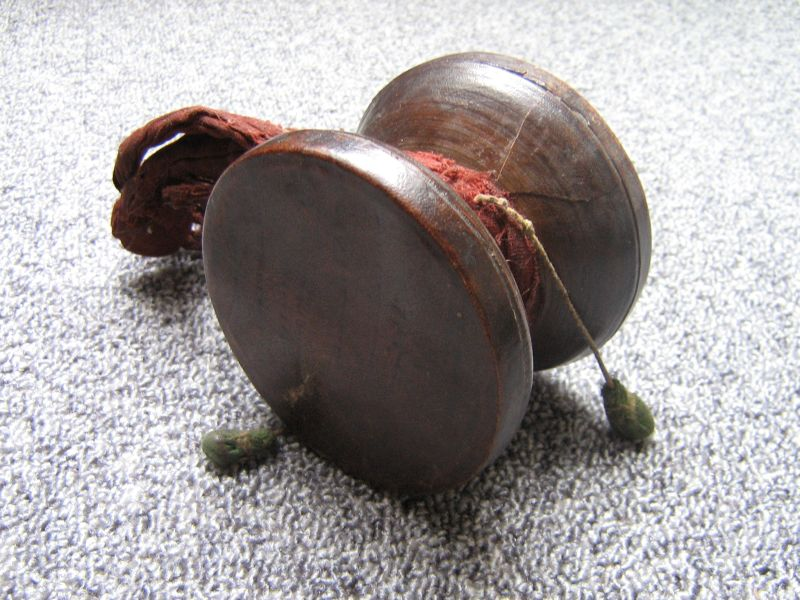
A Damaru

- The golden colour of these elements contrasts with the red background, emphasizing divinity, purity, and supreme authority.

=== Overall symbolism ===
The emblem as a whole represents a disciplined force grounded in balance and higher principles. The Shatkona reflects order and completeness, while the central symbols of Shiva represent controlled power guided by wisdom and purpose.

Symbolically, the Nepali Army can be compared to Shiva in his cosmic form as Nataraja. Just as Shiva performs the Tandav, the dance that destroys ignorance and restores cosmic balance, the Nepali army represents disciplined and decisive force in action. The Trishul reflects precision and authority, while the Damaru symbolizes coordination and unity of action. Like Shiva's cosmic dance, which restores harmony rather than chaos, the Nepali army's role is ultimately protective: to maintain stability, defend the nation, and ensure continuity.

== Legacy ==
=== Gurkhas ===
Nepal is also notable for the Gurkhas. Significant sections of the British Army and Indian Army are recruited from Nepal. This arrangement comes from the days of the British East India Company's rule of India when Company troops tried to invade Nepal and were beaten back. Both sides were impressed with the other, and Gurkhas were recruited into the company's forces. The Gurkhas remained loyal during the Indian Mutiny of 1857 and were kept on in the Indian Army thereafter. Upon Indian independence in 1947, some units went to British service and some to Indian service, with a Britain-India-Nepal Tripartite Agreement signed between the three nations. The Gurkhas are feared troops, and their signature weapon is the khukuri.

== Statistics ==
Military branches: Nepalese Army (includes Nepalese Army Air Service), Armed Police Force Nepal, Nepalese Police Force

Military manpower – military age: 17 years of age

Military manpower – availability:
males age 15–49: 6,674,014 (2003 est.)

Military manpower – fit for military service:
males age 15–49: 3,467,511 (2003 est.)

Military manpower – reaching military age annually:
males: 303,222 (2003 est.)

Military expenditures – dollar figure: $57.22 million (FY02)

Military expenditures – percent of GDP: 1.1% (FY02)

== See also ==
- Shardul Jung Gulma
- Armed Police Force Nepal
- Nepal Police
- Nepal Army Club
- List of military operations involving Gurkhas
- List of ranks in Nepal army after Nepal-Anglo war
- List of Chiefs of the Nepali Army
