= List of ranks in Nepal army after Nepal-Anglo war =

The traditional ranks of the Nepal Army were part of the historical military hierarchy used during the Shah and Rana periods. They included command, combat, and support roles—ranging from officers like Subedar and Jamedar to specialists such as Lohar (blacksmith) and Sarki (leatherworker). Below is the list.

== List ==
1. Subedar (सुबेदार): A senior company-level officer, usually commanding a large group of soldiers. In the traditional Nepal Army, the Subedar acted like a company commander, ranking below commissioned officers like Major but above Jamedar. He handled discipline, orders, and led troops in battle.
2. Jamedar (जमदार): A junior officer rank below Subedar. The Jamedar assisted the Subedar in commanding the platoon, maintaining formation, and training soldiers. This position is similar to a lieutenant in modern military terms.
3. Major (मेजर): A senior officer who commanded a battalion or regiment. Majors were responsible for overall strategy, administration, and coordination among Subedars and Jamedars under them.
4. Adjutant (अजुटेन्ट): An officer responsible for the administration and discipline of a regiment. The Adjutant handled communication between commanding officers and troops, kept records, and issued orders.
5. Kotya (कोट्या): Derived from Kot (fort). A Kotya was the fort guard commander or officer responsible for security at military forts and armories. They oversaw the storage of weapons and guarded the fort entrances.
6. Agadi Nisan (अगाडि निसान): Literally “Front Standard.” This was the front flag bearer during marches or battles. The Agadi Nisan led the army column, carrying the regimental or national flag into the battlefield — a symbol of honor and bravery.
7. Pachadi Nisan (पछाडि निसान): “Rear Standard.” The rear flag bearer who followed the troops and guarded the flag from behind. In battles, Pachadi Nisan ensured that the formation stayed intact and that the regimental flag remained protected.
8. Havaldar (हवल्दार): A non-commissioned officer, similar to a sergeant. The Havaldar commanded a small unit or section of soldiers, relaying orders from officers and maintaining discipline among Sipahis (soldiers).
9. Amaldar (अमल्दार): Originally meaning “enforcer” or “official,” the Amaldar was responsible for executing orders, collecting supplies or payments, and maintaining administrative control in military camps. They ensured that the commanders’ directives were implemented.
10. Sipahi (सिपाही): The ordinary soldier or footman — the backbone of the army. Sipahis carried muskets or swords, marched in formations, and fought under the command of Havaldars and officers.
11. Tabalya (तबल्या): The drummer who played the tabla (small drums). The Tabalya was part of the military band and used drumbeats to communicate signals like march, attack, or retreat during battle and parades.
12. Tasa (तासा): A kettle drummer who played large metal drums. The Tasa produced deep rhythmic sounds used in processions, parades, or battles to boost morale and maintain marching rhythm.
13. Marpha (मार्फा): The trumpeter or bugler who blew horns (narsingha, sanai, etc.) to give sound commands — signaling attack, assembly, or victory. Marphas were essential in both war and ceremonial functions.
14. Bheri (भेरी): A large war drum used for long-distance signaling. Beating the Bheri often marked the start of ceremonies or was used to alarm troops before battle. It symbolized authority and readiness.
15. Basuri (बासुरी): The flute player, part of the military or royal band. Basuri players provided melody in processions, parades, and royal functions — reflecting the cultural and musical traditions of the army.
16. Pipa (Khalasi ko Jamedar) (पिपा - खलासीको जमदार): The leader of the Khalasi group, responsible for supervising porters, laborers, and supply handlers. This rank acted like a foreman, ensuring logistics ran smoothly.
17. Pipa (पिपा): An ordinary porter or supply carrier. Pipas carried weapons, ammunition, tents, and other materials during marches. They were vital to maintaining the army's mobility in mountainous terrain.
18. Khalasi (खलासी): A laborer or helper assigned to transport, set up camps, or maintain military vehicles and animals. Khalasis supported engineers and logistic officers.
19. Lohar (लुहार): A blacksmith in the army — forged and repaired weapons, tools, and metal equipment. They were essential for maintaining the army's arms supply.
20. Khalatya Lohar (खलट्या लुहार):The assistant or apprentice blacksmith who worked under the main Lohar. They learned and performed smaller repair or forging tasks.
21. Sikarmi (सिकर्मी): A carpenter, responsible for building wooden structures like weapon racks, bridges, and carts. They also repaired wooden parts of artillery and wagons.
22. Sarki (सार्की): A leatherworker who made and repaired belts, shoes, and saddles for soldiers and horses. Sarkis were indispensable in maintaining cavalry and marching equipment.
