= Man Bahadur Dhami =

Nepalese politician (born 1983)

Honourable Man Bahadur Dhami
- मानबहादुर धामी

Leader of the Opposition in the Sudurpashchim Provincial Assembly
- In office 6 August 2024 – 16 May 2025
- Chief Minister: Kamal Bahadur Shah
- Preceded by: Kamal Bahadur Shah
- Succeeded by: Khag Raj Bhatta

Minister for Industry, Tourism Forest and Environment of Sudurpashchim Province
- In office 28 May 2021 – 11 January 2023
- Governor: Ganga Prasad Yadav; Dev Raj Joshi
- Chief Minister: Trilochan Bhatta
- Preceded by: Maya Bhatta
- Succeeded by: Ramesh Singh Dhami

Member of the Sudurpashchim Provincial Assembly
- Incumbent
- Assumed office 21 January 2018
- Preceded by: Constituency established
- Constituency: Darchula 1 (B)

Personal details
- Born: 27 February 1983 (age 43) Naugad, Darchula District, Nepal
- Party: Nepali Communist Party
- Other political affiliations: Nepal Communist Party; Communist Party of Nepal (Maoist Centre)
- Spouse: Ishwari Dhami
- Parents: Mangal Singh Dhami (father); Beluli Bhami (mother)
- Profession: Politician

Man Bahadur Dhami (Nepali: मानबहादुर धामी) is a Nepalese politician and currently serving as a member of the Sudurpashchim Provincial Assembly since January 2018, having been elected from Darchula 1 (B) in the 2017 election and was re-elected in the 2022 election. He has previously served as the Minister for Industry, Tourism Forest and Environment from May 2021 to January 2023.

Dhami served as the Chief Whip and then as the Parliamentary Party Leader of the CPN (Maoist Center) and Leader of the Opposition in the Sudurpashchim Provincial Assembly.

== Electoral history ==
=== 2022 provincial elections ===
==== Darchula 1 (B) ====
Candidate	Party	Votes	%
Man Bahadur Dhami	CPN (Maoist Centre)	13,171	51.62
Ram Dutta Joshi	CPN (Unified Marxist–Leninist)	11,856	46.46
Others		490	1.92
Total		25,517	100.00
Valid votes		25,517	100.00
Invalid/blank votes		0	0.00
Total votes		25,517	100.00
Majority		1,315	
CPN (Maoist Centre) hold			

=== 2017 provincial election ===
==== Darchula 1 (B) ====
Candidate	Party	Votes	%
Man Bahadur Dhami	CPN (Maoist Centre)	12,956	55.53
Jagadish Bahaur Pal	Nepali Congress	9,575	41.04
Others		799	3.42
Total		23,330	100.00
Valid votes		23,330	95.92
Invalid/blank votes		993	4.08
Total votes		24,323	100.00
Majority		3,381	
CPN (Maoist Centre) gain			
Source: Election Commission
