= 1st Sudurpashchim Provincial Assembly =

Government Body Elections

2nd Assembly	→

Overview
- Legislative body: Sudurpashchim Provincial Assembly
- Jurisdiction: Sudurpashchim Province, Nepal
- Meeting place: District Coordination Committee Hall, Dhangadhi, Kailali District
- Term: 4 February 2018 – September 2022
- Election: 2017 provincial elections
- Government: Trilochan Bhatta cabinet
- Website: pga.p7.gov.np

Provincial Assembly
- Members: 53
- Speaker: Arjun Bahadur Thapa (UML)
- Deputy Speaker: Nirmala Badal Joshi (Maoist)
- Chief Minister: Trilochan Bhatta (Maoist)
- Leader of the Opposition: Rana Bahadur Rawal (Congress); Prakash Bahadur Shahi (UML)

The first Sudurpashchim Provincial Assembly was elected by the 2017 provincial elections. 53 members were elected to the assembly, 32 of whom were elected through direct elections and 21 of whom were elected through the party list proportional representation system. The term of the assembly started on 4 February 2018 and ended in September 2022. Trilochan Bhatta from the CPN (Maoist Centre) served as chief minister during the term of the assembly. Arjun Bahadur Thapa served as the speaker of the assembly and Nirmala Badal Joshi served as the deputy speaker.

== Composition ==
Party	Seats	
Party	After election	At dissolution
CPN (Unified Socialist)	—	14
CPN (Maoist Centre)	14	13
Nepali Congress	12	11
CPN (UML)	25	11
Loktantrik Samajwadi Party	—	1
People's Socialist Party	—	1
Rastriya Janata Party Nepal	2	—
Vacant	—	2
Total	53	53

== Leaders ==
=== Speakers ===
- Speaker of the Provincial Assembly: Hon. Arjun Bahadur Thapa
  - Deputy Speaker of the Provincial Assembly: Nirmala Badal Joshi

=== Parliamentary Party Leaders ===
- Leader of the House (Nepal Communist Party):Hon. Trilochan Bhatta
- Leader of Opposition (Nepali Congress): Rana Bahadur Rawal

=== Whips ===
- Government Chief Whip (Nepal Communist Party): Tara Lama Tamang
  - Whip (Nepal Communist Party): Akkal Bahadur Rawal
- Opposition Chief Whip (Nepali Congress): Govinda Raj Bohora
  - Whip (Nepali Congress): Tek Bahadur Raika

== List of members ==
Constituency (PR if blank)	Member	Party
Achham 2(A)	Akkal Bahadur Rawal	CPN (Maoist Centre)
Kailali 3(B)	Amar Bahadur Saud	CPN (Unified Socialist)
	Ambi Kumari Thapa	Nepali Congress
	Archana Gahatraj	CPN (UML)
Bajhang 1(A)	Arjun Bahadur Thapa	CPN (UML)
Achham 2(B)	Bal Bahadur Sodari	CPN (Unified Socialist)
Bajura 1(A)	Bal Dev Regmi	CPN (UML)
Doti 1(A)	Bharat Bahadur Khadka	Nepali Congress
	Binita Devi Chaudhary	CPN (Maoist Centre)
Kailali 3(A)	Bir Man Chaudhari	CPN (Maoist Centre)
	Chun Kumari Devi Chaudhary	CPN (Unified Socialist)
Bajhang 1(B)	Devaki Malla (Thapa)	CPN (Maoist Centre)
	Devraj Pathak	Nepali Congress
	Dibeshwory Shah	Nepali Congress
Kailali 5(B)	Dilli Raj Panta	Nepali Congress
Kailali 4(A)	Dirgha Bahadur Sodari	CPN (Unified Socialist)
	Durga Kumari Kami	CPN (Unified Socialist)
Darchula 1(A)	Gelbu Singh Bohara	CPN (UML)
	Govinda Raj Bohara	Nepali Congress
	Hanta Nepali	CPN (Maoist Centre)
Achham 1(A)	Harka Bahadur Kunwar	CPN (UML)
Kailali 1(A)	Krishna Chaudhary	Loktantrik Samajwadi Party
Kailali 4(B)	Krishna Raj Subedi	CPN (UML)
Kanchanpur 1(B)	Kul Bir Chaudhary	CPN (Unified Socialist)
	Kumari Nanda Bam	Nepali Congress
	Kunti Joshi	CPN (Maoist Centre)
Kanchanpur 2(B)	Lal Bahadur Khadka	CPN (Unified Socialist)
Baitadi 1(B)	Liladhar Bhatta	CPN (UML)
Kanchanpur 2(A)	Mahesh Datta Joshi	CPN (Maoist Centre)
	Malamati Rana Tharu	People's Socialist Party
Darchula 1(B)	Man Bahadur Dhami	CPN (Maoist Centre)
Kanchanpur 3(B)	Man Bahadur Sunar	CPN (Maoist Centre)
	Mana Kumari Saud	CPN (Unified Socialist)
	Maya Bhatta	CPN (Unified Socialist)
	Maya Tamang Bohara	CPN (Unified Socialist)
Kailali 2(B)	Nanda Bahadur Saund	CPN (Maoist Centre)
Kailali 5(A)	Nepalu Chaudhary	CPN (UML)
	Nirmala Badal (Joshi)	CPN (Maoist Centre)
Dadeldhura 1(A)	Pathan Singh Bohara	CPN (UML)
Bajura 1(B)	Prakash Bahadur Shah	CPN (UML)
Kanchanpur 3(A)	Prakash Rawal	CPN (Unified Socialist)
Baitadi 1(A)	Prem Prakash Bhatta	CPN (Maoist Centre)
	Purna Joshi	CPN (Unified Socialist)
Kailali 1(B)	Ran Bahadur Rawal	Nepali Congress
Kailali 2(A)	Ratan Bahadur Thapa	CPN (UML)
	Shyamlal Rana Tharu	Nepali Congress
	Sushila Budhathoki	CPN (Unified Socialist)
Kanchanpur 1(A)	Tara Lama Tamang	CPN (Unified Socialist)
	Tek Bahadur Raika Aauji	Nepali Congress
Doti 1(B)	Trilochan Bhatta	CPN (Maoist Centre)
	Uma Devi Badi	Nepali Congress

=== Changes ===
Constituency/PR group	MPA	Party	Date seat vacated	Cause of vacation	New MPA	Party
Achham 1(B)	Jhapat Bahadur Bohara	CPN (Maoist Centre)	19 April 2021	Resignation		
Dadeldhura 1(B)	Karna Bahadur Malla	Nepali Congress	28 April 2022	Resignation		

== See also ==
- Sudurpashchim Province
- 2017 Nepalese provincial elections
