= Prakash Bahadur Shah =

Nepalese politician

- प्रकाश बहादुर शाह

Leader of the Opposition in the Sudurpashchim Provincial Assembly
- In office 8 April 2022 – 7 October 2022
- Chief Minister: Trilochan Bhatta
- Preceded by: Ran Bahadur Rawal
- Succeeded by: Kamal Bahadur Shah
Ministerial offices
Minister for Economic Affairs of Sudurpashchim Province
In office 12 May 2021 – 7 September 2021
| Governor | Ganga Prasad Yadav |
| Chief Minister | Trilochan Bhatta |
| Preceded by | Jhapat Bahadur Bohara (Note: As Minister for Economic Affairs and Planning) |
| Succeeded by | Tara Lama Tamang |
Minister for Internal Affairs and Law of Sudurpashchim Province
In office 17 February 2018 – 28 May 2021
| Governor | Mohan Raj Malla; Sharmila Kumari Panta; Ganga Prasad Yadav |
| Chief Minister | Trilochan Bhatta |
| Preceded by | Office established |
| Succeeded by | Purna Joshi |
Other senior positions
Parliamentary Party Leader of the Communist Party of Nepal (Unified Marxist–Leninist) in the Sudurpashchim Provincial Assembly
In office 8 March 2021 – 7 October 2022
| Preceded by | Position re-established |
| Succeeded by | Rajendra Singh Rawal |
In office 17 February 2018 – 17 May 2018
| Preceded by | Position established |
| Succeeded by | Position abolished |
Parliamentary Party Deputy Leader of the Nepal Communist Party in the Sudurpashchim Provincial Assembly
In office 5 June 2018 – 7 March 2021
| Preceded by | Position established |
| Succeeded by | Position abolished |

Member of the Sudurpashchim Provincial Assembly
- In office 21 January 2018 – 7 October 2022
- Preceded by: Constituency established
- Succeeded by: Padam Bahadur Shahi
- Constituency: Bajura 1(B)

Personal details
- Born: 19 April 1972 (age 54) Bajura District, Nepal
- Party: Nepali Communist Party
- Other political affiliations: Nepal Communist Party; Communist Party of Nepal (Unified Marxist–Leninist)
- Education: Diploma in Engineering
- Alma mater: Pulchowk Campus
- Profession: Politician; Electrical engineer

Prakash Bahadur Shah (Nepali: प्रकाश बहादुर शाह) is a Nepalese politician and served as the Minister for Internal Affairs and Law and the Minister for Economic Affairs of Government of Sudurpashchim Province. He was also a member of the 1st Sudurpashchim Provincial Assembly. In the 2017 Nepalese provincial election, he won the election from Bajura 1(B) (constituency).

Shah was first the parliamentary party leader of the CPN (UML), later became deputy leader after the UML–Maoist merger into the NCP, and following the NCP’s dissolution was re‑elected as CPN (UML) leader, eventually serving as the Leader of the Opposition in the Sudurpashchim Provincial Assembly.
