= Lal Bahadur Khadka =

Nepalese politician

- लाल बहादुर खड्का

Minister for Social Development of Sudurpashchim Province
- In office 28 May 2021 – 8 April 2022
- Governor: Ganga Prasad Yadav; Dev Raj Joshi
- Chief Minister: Trilochan Bhatta
- Preceded by: Krishna Raj Subedi
- Succeeded by: Govinda Raj Bohara
Party positions
Chairman of the Sudurpashchim Provincial Committee of the Communist Party of Nepal (Unified Socialist)
In office 3 April 2025 – 4 November 2025
Preceded by	Harka Bahadur Singh
Succeeded by	Position abolished

Member of the Sudurpashchim Provincial Assembly
- In office 21 January 2018 – September 2022
- Preceded by: Constituency established
- Succeeded by: Bahadur Singh Thapa
- Constituency: kanchanpur 2 (B)

Personal details
- Born: 17 February 1967 (age 59) Nepal
- Party: Nepali Communist Party
- Other political affiliations: CPN (Unified Marxist–Leninist); CPN (Unified Socialist)

Lal Bahadur Khadka (Nepali: लाल बहादुर खड्का) is a Nepalese politician served as the chairman of the Sudurpashchim Provincial Committee of the CPN (Unified Socialist) Party. He was a member of the 1st Sudurpashchim Provincial Assembly, having won the 2017 Nepalese provincial election from Kanchanpur 2(B) constituency.

Khadka served as the Chief Whip of the CPN (UML) parliamentary party in the provincial assembly and as the Minister for Social Development of Sudurpashchim Province.

== Electoral history ==
=== 2022 provincial elections ===
==== Kanchanpur 2 (B) ====
Candidate	Party	Votes	%
Bahadur Singh Thapa	Nepali Congress	10,688	36.41
Kripa Ram Rana	CPN (UML)	8,957	30.51
Lal Bahadur Khadka	CPN (Unified Socialist)	4,410	15.02
Jitendra Chaudhary	Nagrik Unmukti Party	1,870	6.37
Chakra Dev Joshi	Rastriya Prajatantra Party	1,841	6.27
Others		1,591	5.42
Total		29,357	100.00
Majority		1,731	
Nepali Congress hold			

=== 2017 provincial elections ===
==== Kanchanpur 2 (B) ====
Candidate	Party	Votes	%
Lal Bahadur Khadka	CPN (UML)	16,385	55.89
Bahadur Singh Thapa	Nepali Congress	11,851	40.43
Others		1,078	3.68
Total		29,314	100.00
Valid votes		29,314	95.43
Invalid/blank votes		1,403	4.57
Total votes		30,717	100.00
CPN (UML) gain			
Source: Election Commission
