= Khusi Ram Dagaura Tharu =

Nepalese politician (born 1968)

Honourable Khusi Ram Dagaura Tharu
- खुशी राम डगौरा थारु

Minister for Internal Affairs and Law of Sudurpashchim Province
- Incumbent
- Assumed office 21 August 2026
- Governor: Najir Miya
- Chief Minister: Khag Raj Bhatta
- Preceded by: Hira Sarki
Ministerial offices
Minister for Industry, Tourism, Forest and Environment of Sudurpashchim Province
In office 28 March 2024 – 17 April 2024
Governor	Dev Raj Joshi
Chief Minister	Kamal Bahadur Shah
Preceded by	Ramesh Singh Dhami
Succeeded by	Maya Panta; Position dissolved

Member of the Sudurpashchim Provincial Assembly
- Incumbent
- Assumed office 30 December 2022
- Preceded by: Amar Bahadur Saud
- Constituency: Kailali 3 (B)

Personal details
- Born: 14 March 1968 (age 58) Ghodaghodi, Kailali District, Nepal
- Party: Nepali Communist Party
- Other political affiliations: Nagrik Unmukti Party
- Spouse: Rupa Devi Dagaura Tharu
- Parents: Manitara Dagaura Tharu (father); Palti Devi Dagaura Tharu (mother)
- Profession: Politician

Khusi Ram Dagaura Tharu (Nepali: खुशी राम डगौरा थारु) is a Nepalese politician and currently serving as the Minister for Internal Affairs and Law of Sudurpashchim Province. He also serving as a member of the Sudurpashchim Provincial Assembly, having won the 2022 Nepalese provincial election from Kailali 3 (B) constituency.

Tharu served as the Minister for Industry, Tourism, Forest and Environment in the Provincial Government. He also served as the Chief Whip and then as the Parliamentary Party Leader of the Nagrik Unmukti Party in the Provincial Assembly.

== Electoral history ==
=== 2022 provincial elections ===
==== Kailali 3 (B) ====
Candidate	Party	Votes	%
Khusi Ram Dagaura Tharu	Nagrik Unmukti Party	7,539	26.80
Amar Bahadur Saud	CPN (Unified Socialist)	6,619	23.53
Laxman Bahadur Shahi	Independent	5,177	18.40
Jay Narayan Joshi	CPN (UML)	4,236	15.06
Prem Raj Chaudhary	Rastriya Prajatantra Party	2,528	8.99
Others		2,030	7.22
Total		28,129	100.00
Majority		4,206	
Nagrik Unmukti Party hold			
