= Kailash Chaudhary =

Nepalese politician

Honourable Kailash Chaudhary
- कैलाश चौधरी

Minister for Physical Infrastructure Development of Sudurpashchim Province
- In office 25 July 2024 – 1 August 2024
- Governor: Najir Miya
- Chief Minister: Dirgha Bahadur Sodari
- Preceded by: Himself
- Succeeded by: Surendra Bahadur Pal
- In office 18 April 2024 – 30 June 2024
- Governor: Najir Miya
- Chief Minister: Dirgha Bahadur Sodari
- Preceded by: Prakash Bahadur Deuba
- Succeeded by: Himself

Minister for Physical Infrastructure and Transport of Sudurpashchim Province
- In office 30 June 2024 – 25 July 2024
- Governor: Najir Miya
- Chief Minister: Dirgha Bahadur Sodari
- Preceded by: Himself
- Succeeded by: Himself

Minister of State for Land Management, Agriculture, and Cooperatives of Sudurpashchim Province
- In office 2 August 2023 – 8 March 2024
- Governor: Dev Raj Joshi
- Chief Minister: Kamal Bahadur Shah
- Preceded by: Man Bahadur Sunar
- Succeeded by: Indira Giri

Member of the Sudurpashchim Provincial Assembly
- Incumbent
- Assumed office 30 December 2022
- Preceded by: Krishna Bahadur Chaudhary
- Constituency: Kailali 1 (A)

Personal details
- Born: 10 March 1987 (age 39) Bhajani, Kailali District, Nepal
- Spouse: Sonia Chaudhary
- Parents: Ajay Kumar Chaudhary (father); Rani Devi Chaudhary (mother)
- Profession: Politician

Kailash Chaudhary (Nepali: कैलाश चौधरी) is a Nepalese politician and currently serving as a member of the Sudurpashchim Provincial Assembly since 30 December 2022, having won the 2022 Nepalese provincial election from Kailali 1 (A) constituency. He also served as the Minister of State for Land Management, Agriculture, and Cooperatives from 2 August 2023 to 8 March 2024.

Chaudhary previously served as Minister for Physical Infrastructure and Transport from 30 June to 25 July 2024, and as the Minister for Physical Infrastructure Development for two separate terms from 18 April to 30 June 2024, and again from 25 July to 1 August 2024.

== Electoral history ==
=== 2022 provincial elections ===
==== Kailali 1 (A) ====
Candidate	Party	Votes	%
Kailash Chaudhary	Nagrik Unmukti Party	15,101	45.25
Dhirga Raj Binadi	CPN (Maoist Centre)	10,377	31.09
Bhim Bahadur Bam	Rastriya Prajatantra Party	4,060	12.17
Bhagat Ram Tharu(Chaudhary)	People's Socialist Party, Nepal	2,287	6.85
Others		1,547	4.64
Total		33,372	100.00
Majority		4,729	
Nagrik Unmukti Party hold			
