= Chun Kumari Chaudhari =

Nepalese female politician

Chun Kumari Chaudhary
- चुन कुमारी चौधरी
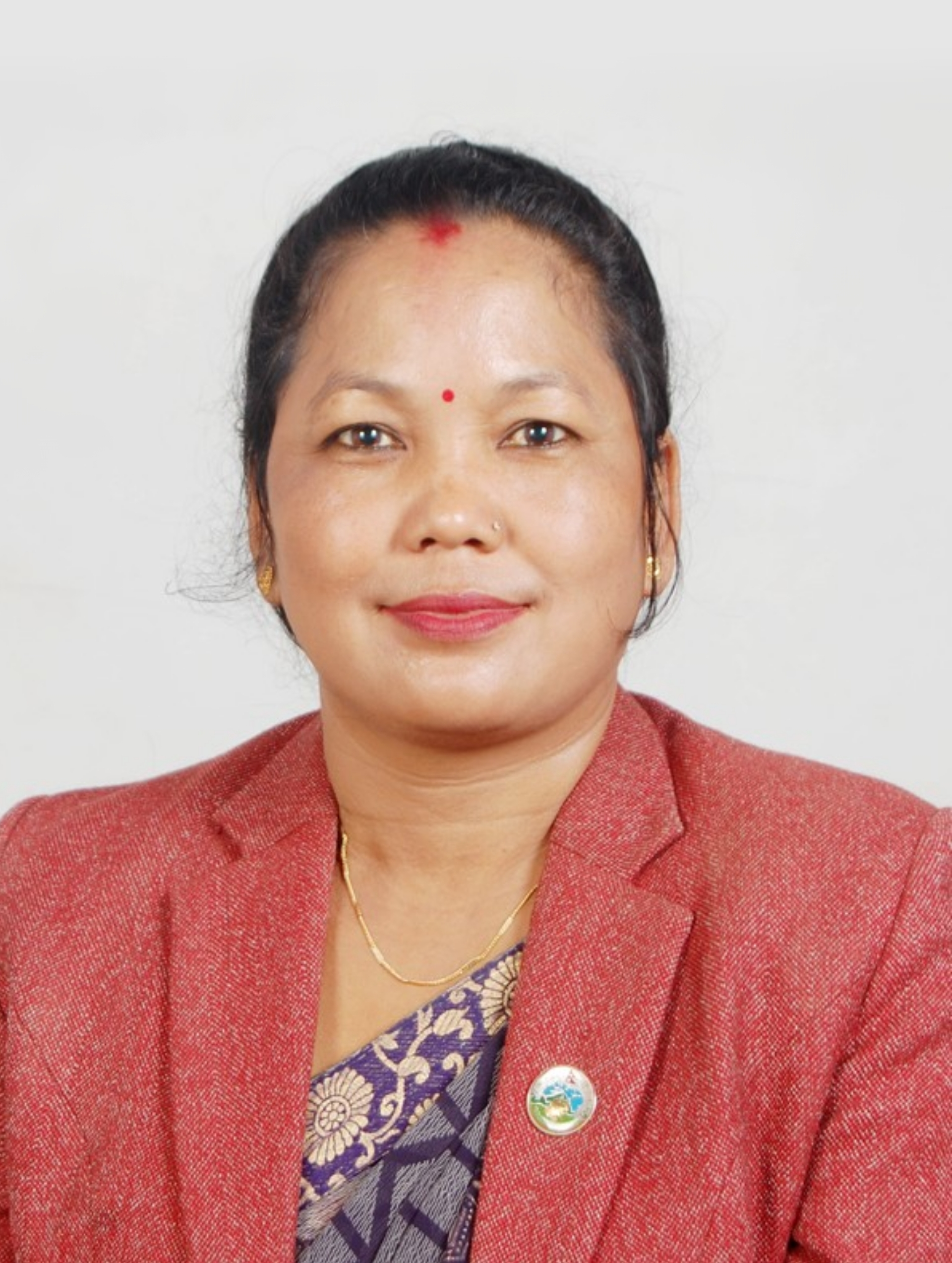
- Official portrait, 2018

Minister of State for Physical Infrastructure Development of Sudurpashchim Province
- In office 28 May 2021 – 8 April 2022
- Governor: Ganga Prasad Yadav; Dev Raj Joshi
- Chief Minister: Trilochan Bhatta
- Preceded by: Office established
- Succeeded by: Kulbir Chaudhary

Member of the Sudurpashchim Provincial Assembly
- In office 21 January 2018 – September 2022

Personal details
- Party: Nepali Communist Party
- Other political affiliations: CPN (Unified Marxist–Leninist); CPN (Unified Socialist)

Chun Kumari Chaudhary (Nepali: चुन कुमारी देवी चौधरी) is a Nepalese politician and who served as Minister of State for Physical Infrastructure Development in the Government of Sudurpashchim Province. She was also a member of the 1st Sudurpashchim Provincial Assembly. In the 2017 Nepalese provincial election, she was elected as a proportional representative from the Tharu people category.

Chaudhary er left the CPN (Unified Marxist–Leninist) to join the newly formed CPN (Unified Socialist) following the party split in 2021.
