= Amar Bahadur Saud =

Nepalese politician

- अमर बहादुर साउँद

Minister of State for Economic Affairs of Sudurpashchim Province
- In office 8 April 2022 – 6 September 2022
- Governor: Dev Raj Joshi
- Chief Minister: Trilochan Bhatta
- Preceded by: Maya Tamang Bohara
- Succeeded by: Bal Bahadur Sodari

Member of the Sudurpashchim Provincial Assembly
- In office 21 January 2018 – September 2022
- Preceded by: Constituency established
- Succeeded by: Khusi Ram Dagaura Tharu
- Constituency: Kailali 3 (B)

Personal details
- Born: 5 September 1974 (age 52) Kailali District, Nepal
- Party: Nepali Communist Party
- Other political affiliations: CPN (Unified Marxist–Leninist); CPN (Unified Socialist)

Amar Bahadur Saud (Nepali: अमर बहादुर साउँद) is a Nepalese politician and who served as Minister of State for Economic Affairs in the Government of Sudurpashchim Province. He was a member of the 1st Sudurpashchim Provincial Assembly, having won the 2017 Nepalese provincial election from Kailali 3 (B) constituency.

Saud later left the CPN (Unified Marxist–Leninist) to join the newly formed CPN (Unified Socialist) following the party split in 2021.

== Electoral history ==
=== 2022 provincial elections ===
==== Kailali 3 (B) ====
Candidate	Party	Votes	%
Khusi Ram Dagaura Tharu	Nagrik Unmukti Party	7,539	26.80
Amar Bahadur Saud	CPN (Unified Socialist)	6,619	23.53
Laxman Bahadur Shahi	Independent	5,177	18.40
Jay Narayan Joshi	CPN (UML)	4,236	15.06
Prem Raj Chaudhary	Rastriya Prajatantra Party	2,528	8.99
Others		2,030	7.22
Total		28,129	100.00
Majority		4,206	
Nagrik Unmukti Party hold			

=== 2017 provincial elections ===
==== Kailali 3 (B) ====
Candidate	Party	Votes	%
Amar Bahadur Saud	CPN (UML)	11,877	44.21
Laxman Bahadur Shahi	Nepali Congress	7,492	27.89
Krishna Kumar Chaudhary	Naya Shakti Party, Nepal	5,196	19.34
Ram Nath Chaudhary	Rastriya Prajatantra Party (Democratic)	1,237	4.61
Others		1,060	3.95
Total		26,862	100.00
Valid votes		26,862	93.59
Invalid/blank votes		1,841	6.41
Total votes		28,703	100.00
CPN (UML) gain			
Source: Election Commission
