= Chief Minister of Sudurpashchim Province =

Head of Sudurpashchim Province government

- सुदूरपश्चिम प्रदेशका मुख्यमन्त्री
- Incumbent; Khag Raj Bhatta since 14 August 2026
- Government of Sudurpashchim Province
- Style: Honorable; Mr. Chief Minister
- Status: Head of Government
- Abbreviation: CMO
- Member of: Provincial Assembly; Cabinet
- Appointer: Governor
- Term length: Until majority confidence retained in provincial assembly Assembly term is 5 years unless dissolved earlier; No term limits
- Formation: 2018 (8 years ago)
- First holder: Trilochan Bhatta
- Salary: रु. - 61,000
- Website: Official website

The Chief Minister of the Sudurpashchim Province is the head of government of Sudurpashchim Province. The chief minister is appointed by the governor of the province according to Article 167 of the Constitution of Nepal. The chief minister remains in office for five years or until the provincial assembly is dissolved, and is subject to no term limits, given that they have the confidence of the assembly.

The current chief minister is Nepali Communist's, Khag Raj Bhatta, in office since 14 August 2026.

== Qualification ==
The Constitution of Nepal sets the qualifications required to become eligible for the office of chief minister. A chief minister must meet the qualifications to become a member of the provincial assembly.

A member of the provincial assembly must be:

- a citizen of Nepal
- a voter of the concerned province
- of 25 years of age or more
- not convicted of any criminal offense
- not disqualified by any law
- not holding any office of profit

In addition to this, the chief minister must be the parliamentary party leader of the party with the majority seats in the provincial assembly. If no party has a majority, the chief minister must have a majority in the assembly with the support from other parties. If within thirty days of the election, a chief minister is not appointed as such, or fails to obtain a vote of confidence from the assembly, the parliamentary party leader of the party with the most seats in the assembly is appointed chief minister. If the chief minister such appointed fails to obtain a vote of confidence in the assembly, any assembly member who can command a majority in the floor, irrespective of party allegiance, is appointed chief minister. If this chief minister also fails to obtain a vote of confidence, the governor dissolves the assembly and fresh elections are called.

== List of chief ministers of Sudurpashchim province ==
No.	Portrait	Name Constituency (lifespan)	Term of office			Assembly (election)	Political party	Cabinet	Ref.
No.	Portrait	Name Constituency (lifespan)	Assumed office	Left office	Time in office	Assembly (election)	Political party	Cabinet	Ref.
1		Trilochan Bhatta; MPA for Doti 1 (B) (born 1969)	17 February 2018	11 January 2023	4 years, 328 days	1st (2017)	CPN (Maoist Centre)	T. Bhatta	
2		Rajendra Singh Rawal; List MPA (born 1964)	12 January 2023	9 February 2023	28 days	2nd (2022)	CPN (UML)	Rawal	
3		Kamal Bahadur Shah; MPA for Kailali 2 (A) (born 1972)	10 February 2023	17 April 2024	1 year, 67 days	2nd (2022)	Nepali Congress	Shah I	
4		Dirgha Bahadur Sodari; MPA for Kailali 4 (A) (born 1978)	18 April 2024	4 August 2024	121 days	2nd (2022)	CPN (Unified Socialist)	Sodari	
(3)		Kamal Bahadur Shah; MPA for Kailali 2 (A) (born 1972)	5 August 2024	13 August 2026	2 years, 8 days	2nd (2022)	Nepali Congress	Shah II	
5		Khag Raj Bhatta; MPA for Dadeldhura 1 (A) (born 1974)	14 August 2026	Incumbent	78 days	2nd (2022)	Nepali Communist Party	K. Bhatta	
