= Prakash Rawal =

Nepali politician

Honourable Prakash Rawal
- प्रकाश रावल

Minister for Industry, Tourism, Forest and Environment of Sudurpashchim Province
- Incumbent
- Assumed office 21 August 2026
- Governor: Najir Miya
- Chief Minister: Khag Raj Bhatta
- Preceded by: Man Bahadur Rawal
Ministerial offices
Minister for Economic Affairs of Sudurpashchim Province
In office 8 April 2022 – 11 January 2023
Governor	Dev Raj Joshi
Chief Minister	Trilochan Bhatta
Preceded by	Tara Lama Tamang
Succeeded by	Naresh Kumar Shahi
Minister of State for Industry, Tourism, Forest and Environment of Sudurpashchim Province
In office 9 October 2018 – 10 November 2019
Governor	Sharmila Kumari Panta
Chief Minister	Trilochan Bhatta
Preceded by	Position created
Succeeded by	Gita Devi Mal

Member of the Sudurpashchim Provincial Assembly
- Incumbent
- Assumed office 21 January 2018
- Constituency: Kanchanpur 3 (A)

Personal details
- Born: August 16, 1967 (age 59) Mahendranagar, Kanchanpur District, Sudurpashchim Province, Nepal
- Party: Nepali Communist Party
- Other political affiliations: CPN (UML)
- Spouse: Gomati Rawal

Prakash Rawal (Nepali:प्रकाश रावल) is a Nepalese politician and currently serving as the Minister for Industry, Tourism, Forest and Environment since 2026. Rawal is also serving as a member a of the Sudurpashchim Provincial Assembly since January 2018, he was elected from Kanchanpur 3(A) constituency.

Rawal has previously served as the Minister of State for Industry, Tourism Forest and Environment from October 2018 to November 2019 and Minister for Economic Affairs from April 2022 to January 2023 and also a parliamentary party deputy leader of Nepali Communist Party in assembly.

== See also ==
- CPN (Unified Socialist)
