= Man Bahadur Sunar =

Nepalese politician

- मान बहादुर सुनार

Minister of State for Land Management, Agriculture and Cooperatives of Sudurpashchim Province
- In office 28 May 2021 – 11 January 2023
- Governor: Ganga Prasad Yadav; Dev Raj Joshi
- Chief Minister: Trilochan Bhatta
- Preceded by: Office established

Member of the Sudurpashchim Provincial Assembly
- In office 21 January 2018 – September 2022
- Preceded by: Constituency established
- Succeeded by: Bel Bahadur Rana Magar
- Constituency: kanchanpur 3 (B)

Personal details
- Born: 26 December 1955 (age 70) Surkhet District, Nepal
- Party: Nepali Communist Party
- Other political affiliations: CPN (Unified Marxist–Leninist); CPN (Unified Socialist)

Man Bahadur Saud (Nepali: मान बहादुर सुनार) is a Nepalese politician and who served as Minister of State for Land Management, Agriculture and Cooperatives in the Government of Sudurpashchim Province. He was a member of the 1st Sudurpashchim Provincial Assembly, having won the 2017 Nepalese provincial election from kanchanpur 3 (B) constituency.

Sunar later left the CPN (Unified Marxist–Leninist) to join the newly formed CPN (Unified Socialist) following the party split in 2021.

== Electoral history ==
=== 2026 general election ===
==== Kanchanpur 3 ====
Candidate	Party	Votes	%
Gyanendra Singh Mahata	Rastriya Swatantra Party	27,118	50.64
Hari Prasad Bohara	Nepali Congress	9,443	17.64
Deepak Prakash Bhatt	CPN (UML)	7,575	14.15
Man Bahadur Sunar	Nepali Communist Party	4,284	8.00
Purna Bahadur Chand	Rastriya Prajatantra Party	3,902	7.29
Others		1,224	2.29
Total		53,546	100.00
Majority		17,675	
Rastriya Swatantra Party hold			

=== 2017 provincial election ===
==== Kanchanpur 3 (B) ====
Candidate	Party	Votes	%
Man Bahadur Sunar	CPN (Maoist Centre)	13,700	48.93
Bel Bahadur Rana Magar	Nepali Congress	13,539	48.36
Others		759	2.71
Total		27,998	100.00
Valid votes		27,998	95.54
Invalid/blank votes		1,306	4.46
Total votes		29,304	100.00
CPN (Maoist Centre) gain			
Source: Election Commission
