= Kunti Joshi =

Nepalese politician

- कुन्ती जोशी

Chairperson of the Sudurpashchim Provincial Assembly Committee on Social Development
- In office 8 September 2018 – 17 September 2022
- Preceded by: Office established
- Succeeded by: Maya Panta

Member of the Sudurpashchim Provincial Assembly
- In office 21 January 2018 – 17 September 2022

Personal details
- Party: Nepali Communist Party
- Other political affiliations: Nepal Communist Party; Communist Party of Nepal (Maoist Centre)
- Profession: Politician

Kunti Joshi (Nepali: कुन्ती जाेशी) is a Nepalese politician who had served as the Chairperson of the Provincial Assembly Committee on Social Development. She was also a member of the 1st Sudurpashchim Provincial Assembly. In the 2017 Nepalese provincial election, she was elected as a proportional representative from the Khas people category.
