= Leader of the Opposition in the Sudurpashchim Provincial Assembly =

Parliamentary position in Sudurpashchim, Nepal

Leader of the Opposition
- सुदूरपश्चिम प्रदेशसभामा प्रमुख विपक्षी दलका नेता
- Incumbent; Kamal Bahadur Shah since 14 August 2026
- Style: The Honourable
- Type: Leader of the Opposition
- Status: Head of the opposition party
- Abbreviation: LOP
- Member of: Sudurpashchim Provincial Assembly
- Appointer: While parliamentary party leader of the largest political party in the Sudurpashchim Provincial Assembly that is not in government
- Inaugural holder: Ran Bahadur Rawal

The Leader of the Opposition (Nepali: प्रमुख विपक्षी नेता) is an elected member of the Sudurpashchim Provincial Assembly who leads the official opposition in the assembly. This role is held by the parliamentary party leader of the provincial assembly's second-largest political party, which has the most seats after the governing party, and is responsible for representing the opposition and holding the government accountable in the legislature. The post is held by Kamal Bahadur Shah.

== Qualification ==
The person selected as the leader of the opposition shall be one who is chosen by a parliamentary party that has neither formed the council of ministers nor supported its formation, in accordance with the following provisions:

(1) The party with the most number of members in the Provincial Assembly,

(2) If there are equal members from more than one party in the Provincial Assembly, the party mutually agreed upon by those parties as their representative

(3) If mutual agreement as per subclause (2) cannot be reached, the party that has written consent from the most number of Provincial Assembly, members to select the leader of the opposition,

(4) If written consent as per subsection (3) is not provided, the party designated by the Speaker of the Sudurpaschim Provincial Assembly shall be recognized,

(5) If a person is already the leader of the opposition and, for any reason, becomes a member of another party in Sudurpaschim Province and that party becomes the one with the more number of members in the Provincial Assembly, then that party shall be recognized.

(6) For the purpose of this section, the concerned party or member must provide mutual agreement as per subsection (2) within fifteen days from the date of the first session of the Provincial Assembly after the election of its members, and if mutual agreement is not reached, written consent as per subsection (3) must be provided within fifteen days.

== List of leaders of the opposition ==
No.	Name Constituency	Term of office		Assembly (election)	Chief Minister's	Ref
1	Ran Bahadur Rawal; MPA for Kailali 1(B)	May 20, 2018	April 8, 2022	1st (2017)	Trilochan Bhatta	
2	Prakash Bahadur Shah; MPA for Bajura 1(B)	April 8, 2022	October 7, 2022	1st (2017)	Trilochan Bhatta	
3	Kamal Bahadur Shah (Note: Opposition Leader who later became Chief Minister); MPA for Kailali 2(A)	January 12, 2023	February 9, 2023	2nd (2022)	Rajendra Singh Rawal	
4	Khag Raj Bhatta; MPA for Dadeldhura 1(A)	February 10, 2023	February 27, 2023	2nd (2022)	Kamal Bahadur Shah	
5	Rajendra Singh Rawal (Note: Opposition Leader who had previously been Chief Minister.); List MPA	February 28, 2023	April 18, 2024	2nd (2022)	Kamal Bahadur Shah	
(3)	Kamal Bahadur Shah; MPA for Kailali 2(A)	April 19, 2024	August 4, 2024	2nd (2022)	Dirgha Bahadur Sodari	
6	Man Bahadur Dhami; MPA for Darchula 1(B)	August 6, 2024	May 16, 2025	2nd (2022)	Kamal Bahadur Shah	
(4)	Khag Raj Bhatta; MPA for Dadeldhura 1(A)	May 17, 2025	August 13 2026	2nd (2022)	Kamal Bahadur Shah	
(3)	Kamal Bahadur Shah; MPA for Kailali 2(A)	August 14, 2026	Incumbent	2nd (2022)	Khag Raj Bhatta	

== See also ==
- Leader of the Opposition
- Leader of the Opposition in the Koshi Provincial Assembly
