= Ran Bahadur Rawal =

Nepalese politician

- प्रकाश बहादुर शाह

Minister for Internal Affairs and Law of Sudurpashchim Province
- In office 8 April 2022 – 11 January 2023
- Chief Minister: Trilochan Bhatta
- Preceded by: Purna Joshi
- Succeeded by: Prithvi Bahadur Singh

Leader of the Opposition in the Sudurpashchim Provincial Assembly
- In office 20 May 2018 – 8 April 2022
- Chief Minister: Trilochan Bhatta
- Preceded by: Position created
- Succeeded by: Prakash Bahadur Shah

Parliamentary party leader of the Nepali Congress in the Sudurpashchim Provincial Assembly
- In office 20 May 2018 – September 2022
- Preceded by: Position created
- Succeeded by: Kamal Bahadur Shah

Member of the Sudurpashchim Provincial Assembly
- In office 21 January 2018 – September 2022
- Preceded by: Constituency established
- Succeeded by: Laxman Kishor Chaudhary
- Constituency: Kailali 1(B)

Personal details
- Party: Nepali Congress

Ran Bahadur Rawal (Nepali: रण बहादुर रावल) is a Nepalese politician who served as the Minister for Internal Affairs and Law in the Government of Sudurpashchim Province. He was a member of the 1st Sudurpashchim Provincial Assembly, having won the 2017 Nepalese provincial election from Kailali 1(B) constituency.

Rawal also served as the Parliamentary party leader of the Nepali Congress and as the Leader of the Opposition in the Sudurpashchim Provincial Assembly.
