= Mana Kumari Saud =

Nepalese female politician

- मना कुमारी साउँद
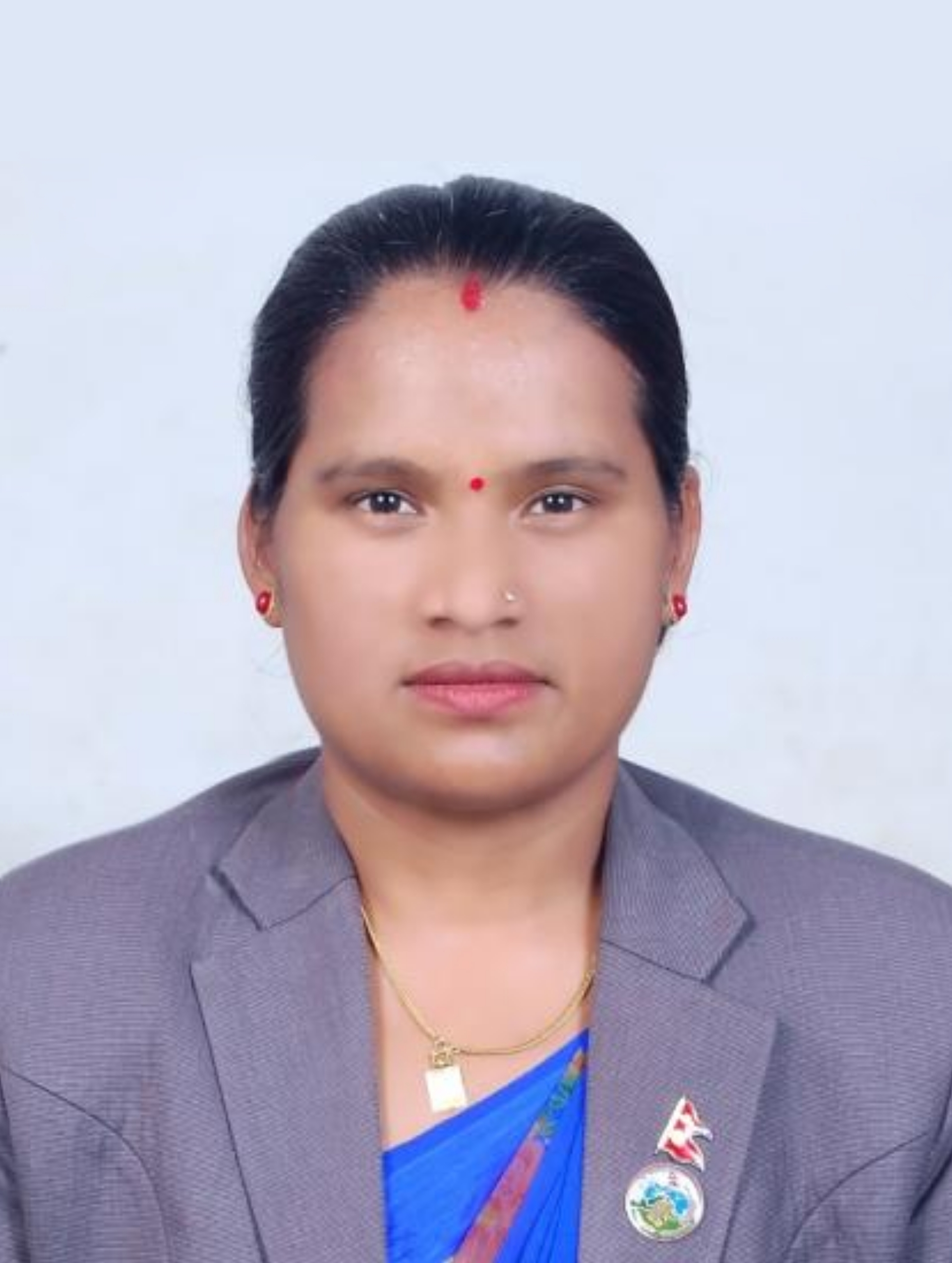
- Official portrait, 2018

Member of the Sudurpashchim Provincial Assembly
- In office 21 January 2018 – September 2022

Personal details
- Party: Nepali Communist Party
- Other political affiliations: CPN (Unified Marxist–Leninist); CPN (Unified Socialist)

Mana Kumari Saud (Nepali: मना कुमारी साउँद) is a Nepalese politician and who served as Minister of State for Social Development in the Government of Sudurpashchim Province. She was also a member of the 1st Sudurpashchim Provincial Assembly. In the 2017 Nepalese provincial election, she was elected as a proportional representative from the Tharu people category.

Saud left the CPN (Unified Marxist–Leninist) to join the newly formed CPN (Unified Socialist) following the party split in 2021.
