= Dirgha Bahadur Sodari =

Nepalese politician

- दिर्घ बहादुर सोडारी

Chief Minister of Sudurpashchim Province
- In office 18 April 2024 – 5 August 2024
- President: Ram Chandra Poudel
- Governor: Najir Miya
- Preceded by: Kamal Bahadur Shah
- Succeeded by: Kamal Bahadur Shah
Ministerial offices
Minister for Physical Infrastructure Development of Sudurpashchim Province
In office 28 May 2021 – 11 January 2023
Governor	Ganga Prasad Yadav; Dev Raj Joshi
Chief Minister	Trilochan Bhatta
Preceded by	Pathan Singh Bohara
Succeeded by	Prakash Bahadur Deuba
Minister for Social Development of Sudurpashchim Province
In office 17 February 2018 – 13 November 2018
Governor	Mohan Raj Malla
Chief Minister	Trilochan Bhatta
Preceded by	Office established
Succeeded by	Krishna Raj Subedi

Member of the Sudurpashchim Provincial Assembly
- Incumbent
- Assumed office 1 February 2018
- Preceded by: Constituency established
- Constituency: Kailali 4 (B)

Personal details
- Born: 27 February 1978 (age 48) Mangalsen, Achham District, Nepal
- Party: Nepali Communist Party
- Other political affiliations: Nepal Communist Party; Communist Party of Nepal (Unified Marxist–Leninist); Communist Party of Nepal (Unified Socialist)

Dirgha Bahadur Sodari (Nepali: दिर्घ बहादुर सोडारी) is a Nepalese politician who serves as a member of the Sudurpashchim Provincial Assembly. Sodari was elected from Kailali 4(B) constituency.

Sodari has previously served as minister of provincial government and is currently the parliamentary party leader of CPN (Unified Socialist) in assembly.

== See also ==
- CPN (Unified Socialist)
