= Maya Panta =

Nepalese politician

Honourable Maya Panta
- माया पन्त

Minister for Industry, Tourism, Forest, and Environment of Sudurpashchim Province
- In office 25 July 2024 – 5 August 2024
- Governor: Najir Miya
- Chief Minister: Dirgha Bahadur Sodari
- Preceded by: Khusi Ram Dagaura Tharu; Position re-established
- Succeeded by: Laxman Kishor Chaudhary

Minister for Industry, Commerce, Tourism and Culture of Sudurpashchim Province
- In office 30 June 2024 – 25 July 2024
- Governor: Najir Miya
- Chief Minister: Dirgha Bahadur Sodari
- Preceded by: Position established
- Succeeded by: Position dissolved

Member of the Sudurpashchim Provincial Assembly
- Incumbent
- Assumed office 30 December 2022

Personal details
- Born: 5 September 1971 (age 54) Khalanga, Darchula District
- Party: Nepali Communist Party
- Other political affiliations: Communist Party of Nepal
- Occupation: Politician

Maya Panta (Nepali: माया पन्त) is a Nepalese politician and currently serving as a member of the member of the 2nd Sudurpashchim Provincial Assembly. In the 2022 Nepalese provincial election, she was elected as a proportional representatives from Khas people category.

Panta has previously served as Minister for Industry, Tourism, Forest, and Environment and Minister for Industry, Commerce, Tourism and Culture in Provincial government of Sudurpashchim Province.
