= Trilochan Bhatta cabinet =

- Cabinet of Sudurpashchim Province
- Date formed: 16 February 2018

People and organisations
- Head of state: Ganga Prasad Yadav (as Governor of Sudurpaschim Pradesh)
- Head of government: Trilochan Bhatta
- No. of ministers: 11
- Member parties: CPN (Unified Socialist); CPN (Maoist Centre); Nepali Congress
- Status in legislature: Majority
- Opposition party: CPN (UML)
- Opposition leader: Prakash Bahadur Shah

History
- Election: 2017
- Legislature term: 5 years
- Predecessor: Province created

Trilochan Bhatta was sworn in as Chief Minister of Sudurpashchim Province on 16 February 2018. Here is the list of ministers.

== Chief Minister & Cabinet Ministers ==
Sl No.	Name	Constituency (PR if blank)	Portfolio	Took office	Left office	Political Party
Cabinet ministers
1	Trilochan Bhatta	Doti 1(B)	Chief Minister	16 February 2018		CPN(Maoist-centre)
2	Dr. Rana Bahadur Rawal	Kailali 1(B)	Minister of Internal Affairs and Law	8 April 2022		Nepali Congress
3	Dirgha Sodari	Kailali 4(A)	Minister of Physical Infrastructure Development	28 May 2021		CPN (Unified Socialist)
4	Govinda Raj Bohara		Minister of Social Development	8 April 2022		Nepali Congress
5	Prakash Rawal	Kanchanpur 3(A)	Minister of Economic Affairs and Planning	8 April 2022		CPN (Unified Socialist)
6	Man Bahadur Dhami	Darchula 1(B)	Minister of Industry, Tourism, Forest and Environment	28 May 2021		CPN(Maoist-centre)
7	Binita Chaudhary		Minister of Land Management, Agriculture and Co-operatives	18 February 2018		CPN(Maoist-centre)
State Ministers
8	Kul Bir Chaudhary	Kanchanpur 1 (B)	Minister of State for Physical Infrastructure Development	8 April 2022		CPN (Unified Socialist)
9	Tek Bahadur Raika Aauji		Minister of State for Social Development	8 April 2022		Nepali Congress
10	Amar Bahadur Saud	Kailali 3 (B)	Minister of State for Economic Affairs and Planning	8 April 2022		CPN (Unified Socialist)
11	Man Bahadur Sunar	Kanchanpur 3 (B)	Minister of State for Land Management, Agriculture and Co-operatives	28 May 2021		CPN(Maoist-centre)

== Former Arrangement ==
=== May 2021 - April 2022 ===
Sl No.	Name	Constituency (PR if blank)	Portfolio	Took office	Left office	Political Party
Cabinet ministers
1	Trilochan Bhatta	Doti 1(B)	Chief Minister	16 February 2018		CPN(Maoist-centre)
2	Purna Joshi		Minister of Internal Affairs and Law	28 May 2021	8 April 2022	CPN (Unified Socialist)
3	Dirgha Sodari	Kailali 4(A)	Minister of Physical Infrastructure Development	28 May 2021		CPN (Unified Socialist)
4	Prakash Bahadur Shah	Bajura 1(B)	Minister of Economic Affairs and Planning	28 May 2021	7 September 2021	CPN-UML
5	Tara Lama Tamang	Kanchanpur 1(A)	Minister of Economic Affairs and Planning	17 September 2021	8 April 2022	CPN (Unified Socialist)
6	Man Bahadur Dhami	Darchula 1(B)	Minister of Industry, Tourism, Forest and Environment	28 May 2021		CPN(Maoist-centre)
7	Binita Chaudhary		Minister of Land Management, Agriculture and Co-operatives	18 February 2018		CPN(Maoist-centre)
State Ministers
8	Chun Kumari Chaudhary		Minister of State for Physical Infrastructure Development	28 May 2021	8 April 2022	CPN (Unified Socialist)
9	Mana Kumari Saud		Minister of State for Social Development	28 May 2021	8 April 2022	CPN (Unified Socialist)
10	Archana Gahatraj		Minister of State for Economic Affairs and Planning	28 May 2021	7 September 2021	CPN-UML
11	Maya Tamang Bohara		Minister of State for Economic Affairs and Planning	17 September 2021	8 April 2022	CPN (Unified Socialist)
12	Man Bahadur Sunar	Kanchanpur 3 (B)	Minister of State for Land Management, Agriculture and Co-operatives	28 May 2021		CPN(Maoist-centre)

=== February 2018 - May 2021 ===
Sl No.	Name	Constituency (PR if blank)	Portfolio	Took office	Left office
Cabinet ministers
1	Trilochan Bhatta	Doti 1(B)	Chief Minister	16 February 2018	
2	Prakash Bahadur Shah	Bajura 1(B)	Minister of Internal Affairs and Law	18 February 2018	28 May 2021
3	Jhapat Bahadur Bohara	Achham 1(B)	Minister of Economic Affairs and Planning	18 February 2018	6 January 2021
4	Dirgha Sodari	Kailali 4(A)	Minister of Social Development	18 February 2018	13 November 2018
5	Krishna Raj Subedi	Kailali 4(B)	Minister of Social Development	13 November 2018	28 May 2018
6	Maya Bhatta		Minister of Industry, Tourism, Forest and Environment	18 February 2018	28 May 2021
7	Binita Chaudhary		Minister of Land Management, Agriculture and Co-operatives	18 February 2018	
8	Pathan Singh Bohara	Dadeldhura 1(A)	Minister of Physical Infrastructure Development	18 February 2018	29 December 2020
State Minister
9	Prakash Rawal	Kanchanpur 3(A)	Minister of State for Industry, Tourism, Forest and Environment	9 October 2018	10 November 2019

== Member by party ==
Representation of cabinet ministers by party
1. Communist Party of Nepal (Unified Socialist) (36.36%)
2. CPN (Maoist Centre) (36.36%)
3. Nepali Congress (27.27%)

Party	Cabinet Ministers	Ministers of State	Total Ministers
CPN (Unified Socialist)	2	2	4
CPN (Maoist Centre)	3	1	4
Nepali Congress	2	1	3

== See also ==
- Sudurpashchim Province
- 1st Sudurpashchim Provincial Assembly
