= Kumari Nanda Bam =

Nepalese politician

- कुमारी नन्दा बम

Chairperson of the Sudurpashchim Provincial Assembly Committee on Public Accounts
- In office 8 September 2018 – 17 September 2022
- Preceded by: Office established
- Succeeded by: Bir Bhadur Thapa

Member of the Sudurpashchim Provincial Assembly
- In office 21 January 2018 – 17 September 2022

Personal details
- Party: Nepali Congress
- Profession: Politician

Kumari Nanda Bam (Nepali: कुमारी नन्दा बम) is a Nepalese politician who had served as the Chairperson of the Provincial Assembly Committee on Public Accounts. She was also a member of the 1st Sudurpashchim Provincial Assembly. In the 2017 Nepalese provincial election, she was elected as a proportional representative from the Khas people category.
