= Binita Devi Chaudhari =

Nepalese politician

- विनिता देवी चौधरी

Member of the Sudurpashchim Provincial Assembly
- In office 21 January 2018 – September 2022

Personal details
- Party: Nepali Communist Party
- Other political affiliations: Nepal Communist Party; Communist Party of Nepal (Maoist Centre)

Binita Devi Chaudhari (Nepali: विनिता देवी चौधरी) is a Nepalese politician who served as the Minister for Land Management, Agriculture and Cooperatives in the Government of Sudurpashchim Province. She was also a member of the 1st Sudurpashchim Provincial Assembly. In the 2017 Nepalese provincial election, she was elected as a proportional representative from the Tharu people category.
