= Archana Gahatraj =

Nepalese politician

- अर्चना गहतराज

Member of the Sudurpashchim Provincial Assembly
- In office 21 January 2018 – September 2022

Personal details
- Party: CPN (Unified Marxist-Leninist)

Archana Gahatraj (Nepali: अर्चना गहतराज) is a Nepalese politician and who served as Minister of State for Economic Affairs in the Government of Sudurpashchim Province. She was also a member of the 1st Sudurpashchim Provincial Assembly. In the 2017 Nepalese provincial election, she was elected as a proportional representative from the Dalit people category.
