= Bal Bahadur Sodari =

Nepalese politician

- बल बहादुर सोडारी

Member of the Sudurpashchim Provincial Assembly
- In office 21 January 2018 – September 2022
- Preceded by: Constituency established
- Succeeded by: Man Bahadur Rawal
- Constituency: Achham 2 (B)

Personal details
- Party: Nepali Communist Party
- Other political affiliations: CPN (Unified Marxist–Leninist); CPN (Unified Socialist)

Bal Bahadur Sodari (Nepali: बल बहादुर सोडारी) is a Nepalese politician and who served as Minister of State for Economic Affairs in the Government of Sudurpashchim Province. He was a member of the 1st Sudurpashchim Provincial Assembly, having won the 2017 Nepalese provincial election from Achham 2 (B) constituency.

Sodari later left the CPN (Unified Marxist–Leninist) to join the newly formed CPN (Unified Socialist) following the party split in 2021.

== Electoral history ==
=== 2017 provincial elections ===
==== Achham 2 (B) ====
Candidate	Party	Votes	%
Bal Bahadur Sodari	CPN (UML)	10,815	52.37
Bal Bahadur Kunwar	Nepali Congress	9,837	47.63
Total		20,652	100.00
Valid votes		20,652	96.77
Invalid/blank votes		690	3.23
Total votes		21,342	100.00
CPN (UML) gain			
Source: Election Commission
