= Jhapat Bahadur Bohara =

Nepalese politician

- झपट बहादुर बोहरा

Member of the Sudurpashchim Provincial Assembly
- In office 21 January 2018 – 19 April 2021

Personal details
- Party: CPN (Unified Marxist–Leninist)
- Other political affiliations: CPN (Maoist Centre); Nepal Communist Party

Jhapat Bahadur Bohara (Nepali: झपट बहादुर बोहरा) is a Nepalese politician and who served as Minister for Economic Affairs and Planning in the Government of Sudurpashchim Province. He was a member of the 1st Sudurpashchim Provincial Assembly, having won the 2017 Nepalese provincial election from Achham 1 (B) constituency.

Bohara is a member of the Communist Party of Nepal (Unified Marxist–Leninist) and serves on its central committee and Achham District in-charge for the party.

== Electoral history ==
=== 2022 general election ===
==== Achham 1 ====
Candidate	Party	Votes	%
Sher Bahadur Kunwor	CPN (Unified Socialist)	19,534	49.56
Jhapat Bahadur Bohara	CPN (UML)	15,045	38.17
Rajan Kunwar	Independent	4,392	11.14
Others		444	1.13
Total		39,415	100.00
Majority		4,489	
CPN (Unified Socialist) gain			

=== 2017 provincial elections ===
==== Achham 1 (B) ====
Candidate	Party	Votes	%
Jhapat Bahadur Bohora	CPN (Maoist Centre)	13,937	62.05
Tek Bahadur Saud	Nepali Congress	8,340	37.13
Others		185	0.82
Total		22,462	100.00
Valid votes		22,462	96.58
Invalid/blank votes		796	3.42
Total votes		23,258	100.00
CPN (UML) gain			
Source: Election Commission
