= Maya Tamang Bohara =

Nepalese politician

- माया तामाङ्ग बोहरा
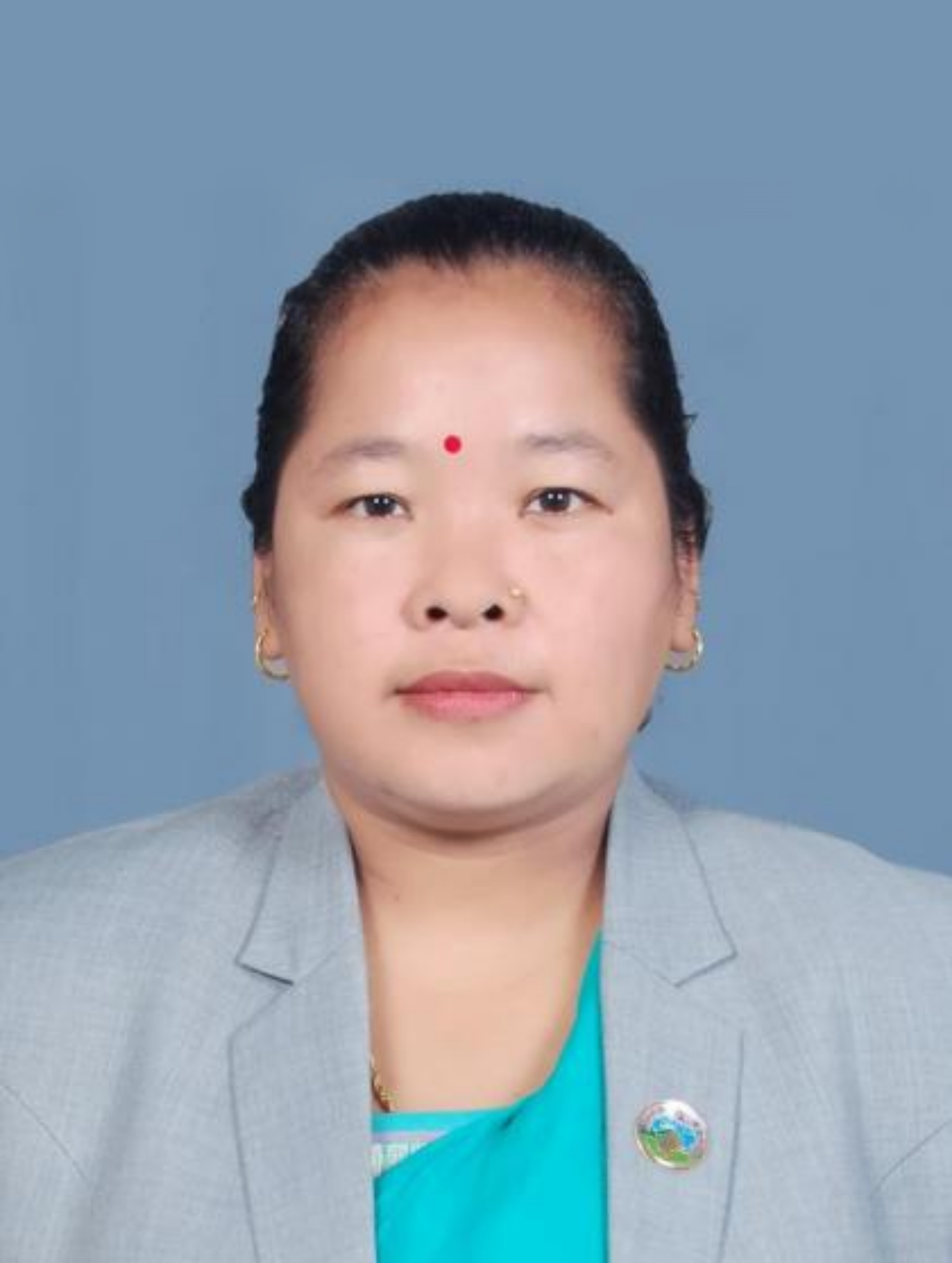
- Official portrait, 2018

Member of the Sudurpashchim Provincial Assembly
- In office 21 January 2018 – September 2022

Personal details
- Party: Nepali Communist Party
- Other political affiliations: CPN (Unified Marxist–Leninist); CPN (Unified Socialist)

Maya Tamang Bohara (Nepali: माया तामाङ्ग बोहरा) is a Nepalese politician and who served as Minister of State for Economic Affairs in the Government of Sudurpashchim Province. She was also a member of the 1st Sudurpashchim Provincial Assembly. In the 2017 Nepalese provincial election, she was elected as a proportional representative from the Khas people category.

She later left the CPN (Unified Marxist–Leninist) to join the newly formed CPN (Unified Socialist) following the party split in 2021.
