= Govinda Raj Bohara =

Nepalese politician

- गोबिन्द राज बोहरा

Member of the Sudurpashchim Provincial Assembly
- In office 21 January 2018 – September 2022

Personal details
- Party: Nepali Congress

Govinda Raj Bohara (Nepali: गोबिन्द राज बोहरा) is a Nepalese politician and who served as Minister for Social Development in the Government of Sudurpashchim Province. He was also a member of the 1st Sudurpashchim Provincial Assembly. In the 2017 Nepalese provincial election, he was elected as a proportional representative from the Khas people category.
