= Koili Devi Chaudhary =

Nepalese female politician

Honourable Koili Devi Chaudhary
- कोइली देवी चौधरी

Deputy Speaker of the Sudurpashchim Provincial Assembly
- Incumbent
- Assumed office 18 January 2023
- Governor: Dev Raj Joshi
- Speaker: Bhim Bahadur Bhandari
- Preceded by: Nirmala Badal Joshi

Member of the Sudurpashchim Provincial Assembly
- Incumbent
- Assumed office 30 December 2022

Personal details
- Born: March 21, 1968 (age 58) Rapti, Dang
- Party: Independent
- Other political affiliations: Nepal Communist Party; CPN (Unified Marxist–Leninist)
- Parents: Shuk Lal Chaudhary (father); Lakshmi Devi Chaudhary (mother)

Koili Devi Chaudhary is a Nepalese politician and currently serving as the deputy speaker of the Sudurpashchim Provincial Assembly. She is currently serving as a member of the 2nd Sudurpashchim Provincial Assembly . In the 2022 Nepalese provincial election she was elected as a proportional representative from the Tharu people category.
