= Purna Joshi =

Nepalese female politician

- पूर्णा जोशी

Member of the Sudurpashchim Provincial Assembly
- In office 21 January 2018 – September 2022

Personal details
- Party: Nepali Communist Party
- Other political affiliations: CPN (Unified Marxist–Leninist); CPN (Unified Socialist)

Purna Joshi (Nepali: पूर्णा जोशी) is a Nepalese politician who served as Minister for Internal Affairs and Law and as Spokesperson of the Government of Sudurpashchim Province. She was also a member of the 1st Sudurpashchim Provincial Assembly. In the 2017 Nepalese provincial election, she was elected as a proportional representative from the Khas people category.

Joshi later left the CPN (Unified Marxist-Leninist) to join the newly formed CPN (Unified Socialist) following the party split in 2021.
