= Olivette Otele =

Historian (born 1970)

Olivette Otele FRHistS FLSW
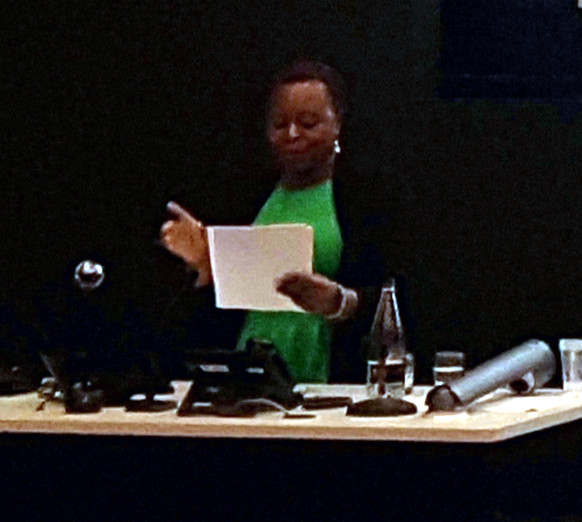
- Otele in 2019
- Born: 1970 (age 55–56); Cameroon

Academic background
- Education: Sorbonne University (BA, 1998; MA, 2000; PhD, 2005)
- Thesis: Mémoire et politique (2005)
- Doctoral advisor: Jean-Claude Redonnet
- Influences: Cheikh Anta Diop; Elikia M'Bokolo

Academic work
- Discipline: History
- Institutions: Université Paris XIII; Bath Spa University; University of Bristol; SOAS University of London
- Main interests: History of slavery

Olivette Otele FRHistS FLSW (born 1970) is a historian and distinguished research professor of the Legacies and Memory of Slavery at SOAS University of London. She is a Fellow and a former Vice President of the Royal Historical Society, and a Fellow of the Learned Society of Wales. She was previously professor of the history of slavery at Bristol University, and she chaired Bristol's Race Equality Commission. She is an expert on the links between history, memory, and geopolitics in relation to French and British colonial pasts. Otele is the first Black woman to be appointed to a professorial chair in History in the United Kingdom.

== Early life and education ==
Otele was born in Cameroon in 1970 and grew up in Paris, France. She is of Cameroonian heritage, and has been described as the "quintessential African European". Otele studied at the Universite La Sorbonne in Paris, working on European colonial and post-colonial history. She completed her Bachelor of Arts degree in literature in 1998, and her Master of Arts degree in 2000. She received her Doctor of Philosophy degree from Universite La Sorbonne in 2005 for a doctoral thesis entitled Mémoire et politique: l'enrichissement de Bristol par le commerce triangulaire, objet de polémique. Her dissertation examined the city of Bristol's role in the trans-Atlantic slave trade.

== Career ==
After completing her doctoral studies, Otele was made an associate professor at Université Paris XIII. She was appointed as a senior lecturer at Bath Spa University in 2013. In 2018, at the age of 48, Otele became the first Black woman to be made professor of history in the United Kingdom, appointed at Bath Spa University She acknowledged that her promotion to the professoriate took longer because she has caring responsibilities as a mother to two children and because she is a woman of colour. The Race, Ethnicity & Equality Report published by the Royal Historical Society in October 2018 found that only 0.5 per cent of historians working in UK universities are Black. Until Otele's promotion there had never been a black woman professor of history in the UK. Otele hopes that her appointment will "open the door for many hard-working women, especially black women in academia".

On her promotion, Otele commented that "any success that is used only to improve one's own life is a waste of possibilities. That is why being the first Black female history professor does not mean anything to me if I'm not given and can't find means to bring others up." Otele highlighted the difficulties she encountered in becoming a professor: "I've worked very hard and kept pushing and had a family....It's hard. I'm tired. It's bleak." Otele has said: "I became pregnant when I was doing my PhD, so I had to learn how to work faster and in different ways." The vice-chancellor of Bath Spa University, Sue Rigby, described her as "world-class and internationally respected". Otele announced her promotion from her active Twitter account to her 25,000 followers.

In October 2019 it was announced that Otele had been appointed as the first professor of the history of slavery at Bristol University. She assumed her post in January 2020, and began a two-year research project to examine Bristol's connection to the transatlantic slave trade. The research was intended to be "a landmark in the way Britain examines, acknowledges and teaches the history of enslavement." In spring of 2022, Otele left Bristol for SOAS, a shift she addressed in a Twitter thread that received much attention.

Otele is a board member of Historians Against Slavery, and she was Otele was a judge of the International Man Booker Prize. She is an executive board member for The British Society for the Eighteenth-Century Studies, a member of the Association for Cultural Studies, and a member of the Centre international de recherches sur les esclavages. She also sits on the board of the National Archives Trust and is on the V&A Museum's research committee. In June 2020, Otele was appointed as independent Chair of Bristol's Commission on Race Equality, which is an unpaid role. In 2022, Otele was a visiting research fellow in African Canadian history with the Huron Community History Centre and the Department of History at Huron University.

== Research ==
Otele has written about cultural and collective memory and the memorialisation of the past. She analyses the legacies of European colonisation in post-slavery societies. She has published academic articles about Afro-European identities, including Frenchness, British identities in Wales, and what it meant to be British, Welsh, and Black. Otele has participated in several major research grants looking at the African diaspora. She looks at the way the societies of Britain and France address citizenship. She has studied the Atlantic slave trade. Otele was the Principal Investigator for the project People of African Descent in the 21st Century: Knowledge and Cultural Production in Reluctant Sites of Memory, which received £24,022 in funding from the Arts and Humanities Research Council. The project ran from May 2017 to November 2018.

Otele has authored three books, and contributed to several other books. She published L'histoire de l'esclavage transatlantique britannique: des origines de la traite transatlantique aux prémisses de la colonisation in 2009. Her monograph Afro-Europeans: a Short History was published in 2020 by Hurst Publishers. The publisher Hodder bought the exclusive rights to the audiobook version, to be narrated by Otele and released alongside the hardback publication. The Guardian described the book as a "fascinating history, with a memorable cast of characters", the review by historian Fara Dabhoiwala stating: "Though this is a work of synthesis, it's an unusually generous and densely layered one. Otele is not just concerned to tell the life stories of her protagonists, but also to follow their changing portrayals after death – as well as explaining how and why they’ve been differently interpreted by generations of previous scholars.... As she argues, providing multiple and more inclusive histories can empower people, and help discredit and dismantle racial injustice in the present." African Europeans was shortlisted for the Orwell Prize in 2021, was a finalist for the 2022 LA Times Book Prize, in addition to being named a Guardian Best Book of 2020, a Waterstones Best Book of 2020 and a History Today Book of the Year 2020.

Otele's edited volume, Post-Conflict Memorialization: Missing Memorials, Absent Bodies, was published in 2021 by Palgrave Macmillan. Otele is leading the project "We Are Bristol: Reparative Justice Through Collaborative Research" at the University of Bristol. The project works with local communities to understand how the history of the transatlantic slave-trade is still impacting the Bristolian population today. The project is funded by a grant of £290,000 from UK Research and Innovation (UKRI).

Otele describes her motivation for studying history as "this urge related to social justice. I wanted to understand the root of racism and discrimination – this idea of hating someone for something they are not responsible for, something that is incredibly random." She believes the most important thing history has ever taught her is kindness. Her greatest influence is the Congolese historian Elikia M'Bokolo. Otele says the book that has had the greatest impact on her is Nations nègres et culture by Cheikh Anta Diop. Otele speaks French, English, some German, and three Cameroonian languages, Ewondo, Eton and Bulu.

== Media ==
Otele has written for the BBC's HistoryExtra Magazine, The Conversation, and Times Higher Education. She also regularly contributes to other press, television and radio programmes, including The Guardian, Sky News, The Sunday Times, Elle Magazine, Huffington Post and The New Yorker. She has contributed to BBC Radio Four and BBC Radio Three programmes including Free Thinking, You're Dead To Me (speaking as an expert on Alexandre Dumas and Chevalier de Saint-Georges), Arts and Ideas, and Start the Week. She chose Maya Angelou as her "Great Life" for Radio Four's Great Lives, presented by Matthew Parris. She has also appeared on Dan Snow's History Hit podcast. Otele is part of the John Blanke Project, a collaboration of artists and historians celebrating Black Tudors. She spoke at the 2018 Winchester History Weekend, How Africans Changed Early Modern Europe. Otele considered outstanding Africans and Europeans who are not otherwise remembered in popular history books. She was interviewed by Krishnan Guru-Murthy for Channel 4 News podcast series Ways to Change the World: "Will a Summer of Race Protests Create Lasting Change?" in October 2020.

== Recognition and honours ==
Otele was named on the BBC 100 Women 2018 List. She appears at number 69, alongside Abisoye Ajayi-Akinfolarin, Nimco Ali, and Uma Devi Badi.

Otele gave the keynote address at the Social History Society Annual Conference, University of Lincoln, 11 June 2019. In May 2019 she was elected to vice-president of the Royal Historical Society. In 2020, Otele was listed by Prospect as the sixth-greatest thinker for the COVID-19 era. Otele commented on the media attention this brought as an "overwhelming pressure to be the face of diversity and to solve racism".

Otele was photographed to honour the contributions of Black, Asian and minority ethnic (BAME) staff, students and alumni, at Bristol University. Her portrait features in a series to celebrate the Be More Empowered for Success programme run by the university to support BAME groups. Otele's portrait features her holding a portrait of Dame Pearlette Louisy, Governor General of Saint Lucia from 1997 to 2017, who completed a PhD in the Department of Education at Bristol in 1991. Otele described Pearlette as "a pioneer and a dedicated educator whose positive impact spans across several decades. It is a privilege to sit beside her portrait."

In 2021, the Institute of Historical Research set up the annual Olivette Otele Prize to be awarded "for the best paper submitted to the History Lab Postgraduate Research Seminar by a Black PhD research student based in the UK".

In 2022, Otele received an honorary doctorate from the Faculty of Arts and Science at Concordia University, and in 2026 she was awarded an honorary doctorate from Université catholique de Louvain. She was also elected as a Fellow of the Learned Society of Wales.

In 2023, Olivette was made Commandeur de L'Ordre de La Valeur by special decree from the President of Cameroon, alongside Boxing world champion Francis Ngannou, and she was awarded a Chevalier de Saint Georges Medal of Honour by President of Culture, Mayor and President of Tourism of Guadeloupe.

In 2024, a statue of Lady Rhondda was unveiled, which includes a circle of hands cast from forty women's hands, among them the hands of Otele.

== Published work ==
=== Monographs and edited volumes ===
- Histoire de l'esclavage britannique: des origines de la traite transatlantique aux premisses de la colonisation (Paris: M. Houdiard, 2008)
- African Europeans: An Untold History (Hurst, 2020), ISBN 9781787381919
- Otele, Olivette, Gandolfo, Luisa, Galai, Yoav (eds), Post-Conflict Memorialization: Missing Memorials, Absent Bodies (London: Palgrave Macmillan, 2021)

=== Book chapters and journal articles ===
- "Within and Outside Western Feminism and Grand Narratives: Cameroonian Women's Sites of Resistance", Nationalism(s), Post-nationalism(s): Centre de Recherche Interdisciplinaire, ed. M. Piquet (Paris: Presses de Paris-Dauphine, 2008), pp. 119–129
- "Religion and Slavery: A Powerful Weapon for Pro-slavery and Abolitionist Campaigners", Le Debat sur l'abolition de l'esclavage en Grande Bretagne, 1787–1840, ed. M. Prum and F. Le Jeune (Paris: Editions Ellipses, 2008), pp. 89–102
- "Liverpool dans la traite transatlantique: Imperatifs et pratiques des peres de la cite", Villes portuaires du commerce triangulaire à l'abolition de l'esclavage. Cahiers de l'histoire et des mémoires de la traite négrière, de l'esclavage et de leurs abolitions en Normandie, 1, ed. Saunier (Cléon: Routes du philanthrope, 2009), pp. 57–70
- "Dependance, pouvoir et identite ou les ambiguites de la 'camerounicite'", 50 ans après, quelle indépendance pour l'Afrique?, ed. G. Makhily (Paris: Philippe Rey, 2010), pp. 467–482, ISBN 9782848761565
- "Resisting Imperial Governance in Canada: From Trade and Religious Kinship to Black Narrative Pedagogy in Ontario", The Promised Land: History and Historiography of the Black Experience in Chatham-Kent's Settlements and Beyond (Toronto: University of Toronto Press, 2014), ISBN 9781442647176
- "History of Slavery, Sites of Memory, and Identity Politics in Contemporary Britain", A Stain on Our Past: Slavery and Memory (Trenton: Africa World Press, 2017), pp. 189–210, ISBN 9781569025802
- "'Liberté, Egalité, Fraternité': Debunking the Myth of Egalitarianism in French Education", in Unsettling Eurocentrism in the Westernized University, ed. J. Cupples and R. Grosfoguel (London: Routledge, 2018)

=== Articles ===
- "We Need to Talk About Slavery's Impact on All of Us", The Guardian, 9 November 2019
- "These Anti-racism Protests Show It's Time for Britain to Grapple with Its Difficult History", The Guardian, 9 June 2020
- "Black activism can't be effective if we aren't taught black history", The Guardian, 28 October 2020
- "Roy Hackett was a civil rights hero – everyone in Britain should know his name", The Guardian, 3 August 2022
- "Today we remember the tragedy of slavery, but the culture war that denies Britain's past continues", The Guardian, 23 August 2022
