= First Kamal Bahadur Shah cabinet =

3rd cabinet of Sudurpashchim Province, in Nepal

- 3rd Cabinet of Sudurpashchim Province
- 2023–2024
- Date formed: 10 February 2023
- Date dissolved: 4 April 2024

People and organisations
- Governor: Dev Raj Joshi
- Chief Minister: Kamal Bahadur Shah
- No. of ministers: 3
- Member parties: Nepali Congress Coalition partners: Unified Socialist External support: Maoist Centre; Nagrik Unmukti
- Status in legislature: Provincial Assembly 42 / 53 (79%)
- Opposition party: CPN (UML)

History
- Election: 2022
- Legislature term: 5 years
- Predecessor: Rajendra Rawal cabinet
- Successor: Dirgha Bahadur Sodari cabinet

The First Kamal Bahadur Shah cabinet was the 3rd cabinet of Sudurpashchim Province. It was formed after previous Chief minister, Rajendra Singh Rawal failed to win vote of confidence.

== History ==
Rajendra Singh Rawal was appointed chief minister on 12 January 2023. His tenure lasted only 28 days after his appointment as Nagrik Unmukti Party decided to not give him vote of confidence. Hence, Kamal Bahadur Shah, leader of the opposition was appointed Chief minister. He won 41 votes against 11 in the vote of confidence.

== Ministries by Party ==
1. Nepali Congress (66.7%)
2. CPN (Unified Socialist) (33.3%)

Party	Cabinet Ministers	Ministers of State	Total Ministers
Nepali Congress	3	0	3
Nagrik Unmukti	3	1	4

== Council of ministers ==
S.N.	Portfolio	Name	Party	Took office	Left office
Cabinet ministers
1	Chief Minister	Kamal Bahadur Shah	Congress	10 February 2023	5 April 2024
2	Minister for Physical Infrastructure Development	Prakash Bahadur Deuba	Congress	10 February 2023	5 April 2024
3	Minister for Interior Affairs and Law	Shivaraj Bhatta	Congress	20 May 2023	5 April 2024
4	Minister for Economic Affairs	Ghanshyam Chaudhary	Nagrik Unmukti	9 March 2024	5 April 2024
5	Minister for Land Management, Agriculture and Cooperatives	Rameshwar Chaudhary	Nagrik Unmukti	2 August 2023	5 April 2024
6	Minister of Industry, Tourism, Forest and Environment	Khushiram Dagarura Tharu	Nagrik Unmukti	9 March 2024	5 April 2024
7	Minister for Social Development	Laxman Kishor Chaudhary	Nagrik Unmukti	11 March 2024	5 April 2024
State ministers
8	Minister of state for Land Management, Agriculture and Cooperatives	Indira giri	Nagrik Unmukti	9 March 2024	5 April 2024

== Former Council of ministers ==
=== Til March 2024 ===
S.N.	Portfolio	Name	Party	Took office	Left office
Cabinet ministers
1	Chief Minister	Kamal Bahadur Shah	Congress	10 February 2023	5 April 2024
2	Minister for Physical Infrastructure Development	Prakash Bahadur Deuba	Congress	10 February 2023	5 April 2024
3	Minister for Economic Affairs	Naresh Kumar Shahi	Unified Socialist	10 February 2023	7 March 2024
4	Minister for Internal Affairs and Law	Shivaraj Bhatta	Congress	2 August 2024	5 April 2024
5	Minister for Social Development	Jhapat Bahadur Saud	Maoist Centre	20 May 2023	5 March 2024
6	Minister for Industry, Tourism, Forest and Environment	Ramesh Singh Dhami	Maoist Centre	20 May 2023	5 March 2024
7	Minister for Land Management, Agriculture and Cooperatives	Rameshwar Chaudhary	Nagrik Unmukti	2 August 2023	5 April 2024
State ministers
8	Minister of States for Industry, Tourism, Forest and Environment	Gita Devi Mal	Maoist Centre	20 May 2023	5 March 2024
9	Minister of State for Land Management, Agriculture and Cooperatives	Kailash Chaudhary	Nagrik Unmukti	2 August 2023	8 March 2024

=== June 2023 ===
S.N.	Portfolio	Name	Party	Took office	Left office
Cabinet ministers
1	Chief Minister	Kamal Bahadur Shah	Congress	10 February 2023	5 April 2024
2	Minister for Physical Infrastructure Development	Prakash Bahadur Deuba	Congress	10 February 2023	5 April 2023
3	Minister for Economic Affairs	Naresh Kumar Shahi	Unified Socialist	10 February 2023	7 March 2024
4	Minister for Internal Affairs and Law	Prithvi Bahadur Singh	Congress	20 May 2023	20 June 2023
5	Minister for Social Development	Jhapat Bahadur Saud	Maoist Centre	20 May 2023	5 March 2024
6	Minister for Industry, Tourism, Forest and Environment	Ramesh Singh Dhami	Maoist Centre	20 May 2023	5 March 2024
State ministers
7	Minister of States for Industry, Tourism, Forest and Environment	Gita Devi Mal	Maoist Centre	20 May 2023	5 March 2024

== See also ==
- Second Kamal Bahadur Shah cabinet
- Kedar Karki cabinet
- Surendra Raj Pandey cabinet
- Dilli Bahadur Chaudhary cabinet
