= Pathan Singh Bohara =

Nepalese politician

- पठान सिंह बोहरा

Member of the Sudurpashchim Provincial Assembly
- In office 21 January 2018 – September 2022

Personal details
- Party: Communist Party of Nepal (Unified Marxist–Leninist)
- Other political affiliations: Nepal Communist Party

Pathan Singh Bohara (Nepali: पठान सिंह बोहरा) is a Nepalese politician who served as the Minister for Physical Infrastructure Development in the Government of Sudurpashchim Province. He was a member of the Sudurpashchim Provincial Assembly, having won the 2017 Nepalese provincial election from Dadeldhura 1 (A) constituency.

== Electoral history ==
=== 2017 Nepalese provincial elections ===
==== Jhapa 5 (A) ====
| Candidate | Party | Votes | % |
|---|---|---|---|
| Pathan Singh Bohora | CPN (UML) | 13,563 | 53.88 |
| Raghubar Bhatta | Nepali Congress | 11,394 | 45.26 |
| Others | | 217 | 0.86 |
| Total | | 25,174 | 100.00 |
| Valid votes | | 25,174 | 96.02 |
| Invalid/blank votes | | 1,044 | 3.98 |
| Total votes | | 26,218 | 100.00 |
| CPN (UML) gain | | | |
Source: Election Commission
