= Karna Bahadur Malla =

Nepali politician

Honourable Karna Bahadur Malla
- कर्ण बहादुर मल्ल

Province Assembly Member of Sudurpaschim Province
- In office 2017 – 28 April 2022
- Preceded by: Assembly Created

Personal details
- Born: Dadeldhura, Sudurpashchim Province, Nepal
- Party: Nepali Congress (B.P.)
- Other political affiliations: Nepali Congress

Karna Bahadur Malla (Nepali: कर्ण बहादुर मल्ल) is a Nepali politician. He served as member of the Provincial Assembly of Sudurpashchim Province.

== Electoral history ==
=== Dadeldhura 1(B) ===
Party	Candidate	Votes
Nepali Congress	Karna Bahadur Malla	13,413
CPN (Unified Marxist-Leninist)	Tara Prasad Joshi	13,057
Others		146
Invalid votes		1,108
Result	Congress gain	
Source: Election Commission
