= Maya Bhatta =

Nepali female politician

- माया भट्ट

Member of the Sudurpashchim Provincial Assembly
- In office 21 January 2018 – September 2022

Personal details
- Party: Communist Party of Nepal (Unified Socialist)
- Other political affiliations: Nepal Communist Party; Communist Party of Nepal (Unified Marxist–Leninist)

Maya Bhatta (Nepali: माया भट्ट) is a Nepalese politician who served as Minister for Industry, Tourism, Forest and Environment in the Government of Sudurpashchim Province. She was also a member of the 1st Sudurpashchim Provincial Assembly. In the 2017 Nepalese provincial election, she was elected as a proportional representative from the Khas people category.
