= Second Kamal Bahadur Shah cabinet =

3rd cabinet of Sudurpashchim Province, in Nepal

- 5th Cabinet of Sudurpashchim Province
- Date formed: 5 August 2024
- Date dissolved: 13 August 2026

People and organisations
- Governor: Najir Miya
- Chief Minister: Kamal Bahadur Shah
- No. of ministers: 10
- Ministers removed: 4; 1 resigned
- Total no. of members: 10
- Member parties: Nepali Congress; CPN (UML); (Until 15 June, 2026)
- Status in legislature: Provincial Assembly 29 / 53 (55%)
- Opposition party: CPN (Maoist Centre); CPN (US); RPP
- Opposition leader: Man Bahadur Dhami (CPN (Maoist Centre))

History
- Election: 2022
- Legislature term: 5 years
- Predecessor: Dirgha Bahadur Sodari cabinet

The Second Kamal Bahadur Shah cabinet was the 5th cabinet of Sudurpashchim Province. It was formed after the national level alliance was formed between the largest and second largest party of the nation, the Nepali Congress and CPN (UML) formed alliance at national level.

== History ==
Kamal Bahadur Shah was appointed chief minister on 4 August 2024. With the support of MLAs from Nepali Congress, CPN (UML) and Nagrik Unmukti Party, Shah and six other ministers took oat on 5 August 2024.

On July 15, 2026 the 4 ministers from CPN (UML) were sacked by chief minister Shah when they refused to back the provincial budget in the provincial parliament.

== Ministries by Party ==
1. Nepali Congress (60.0%)
2. CPN (UML) (40.0%)

Party	Cabinet Ministers	Ministers of State	Total Ministers
Nepali Congress	4	2	6
CPN (UML)	3	1	4

== Council of ministers ==
S.N.	Portfolio	Minister responsible	Political Party	Constituency	Took office
Cabinet Ministers
1	Chief Minister	Kamal Bahadur Shah	Congress	Kailali 2 (A)	5 August 2024
2	Minister for Economic Affairs	Bikram Singh Dhami	Nepali Congress	Darchula 1 (A)	8 June 2026
3	Minister of Social Development	Vel Bahadur Rana Magar	Nepali Congress	Achham 1 (A)	8 June 2026
4	Minister of Industry, Tourism, Forest and Environment	Man Bahadur Rawal	Nepali Congress	Achham 2 (B)	8 June 2026
State Ministers
1	Minister of State for Social Development	Madhu Devi Bharati	Nepali Congress	Party list (Khas Arya)	8 June 2026
2	Minister of State for Economic Affairs	Janu Kumari Dani	Nepali Congress	Party list (Khas Arya)	8 June 2026

== Former Council of ministers ==
=== until 14th July 2026 ===
S.N.	Portfolio	Name	Party	Took office	Left office
Cabinet Ministers
1	Chief Minister	Kamal Bahadur Shah	Congress	5 August 2024	Incumbent
2	Minister for Economic Affairs	Bahadur Singh Thapa	Nepali Congress	5 August 2024	7 June 2026
3	Minister for Physical Infrastructure Development	Surendra Bahadur Pal	CPN (UML)	5 August 2024	15 July 2026
4	Minister for Social Development	Meghraj Khadka	Nepali Congress	5 August 2024	7 June 2026
5	Minister for Interior Affairs and Law	Hira Sarki	CPN (UML)	5 August 2024	15 July 2026
6	Minister for Land Management, Agriculture and Cooperatives	Bir Bahadur Thapa	CPN (UML)	5 August 2024	15 July 2026
7	Minister for Industry, Tourism, Forest, and Environment	Shivraj Bhatta	Nepali Congress	6 April 2026	7 June 2026
State Ministers
8	Minister of State for Economic Affairs	Prakash Bahadur Bam	Nepali Congress	5 August 2024	7 June 2026
9	Minister of State for Social Development	Sarswati Khadka	Nepali Congress	5 August 2024	7 June 2026
10	Minister of State for Physical Infrastructure Development	Nirmala Devi Saud	CPN (UML)	5 August 2024	15 July 2026

== See also ==
- Kedar Karki cabinet
- Surendra Raj Pandey cabinet
- Dilli Bahadur Chaudhary cabinet
