= Khag Raj Bhatta =

Nepalese politician

Honourable Khag Raj Bhatta
- खग राज भट्ट

Chief Minister of Sudurpashchim Province
- Incumbent
- Assumed office 14 August 2026
- President: Ram Chandra Poudel
- Governor: Najir Miya
- Preceded by: Kamal Bahadur Shah

Leader of the Opposition in the Sudurpashchim Provincial Assembly
- In office 17 May 2025 – 13 August 2036
- Chief Minister: Kamal Bahadur Shah
- Preceded by: Man Bahadur Dhami
- Succeeded by: Kamal Bahadur Shah
- In office 10 February 2023 – 27 February 2023
- Chief Minister: Kamal Bahadur Shah
- Preceded by: Kamal Bahadur Shah
- Succeeded by: Rajendra Singh Rawal

Member of the Sudurpashchim Provincial Assembly
- Incumbent
- Assumed office 30 December 2022
- Preceded by: Pathan Singh Bohara
- Constituency: Dadeldhura 1 (A)

Personal details
- Party: Nepali Communist Party
- Other political affiliations: Communist Party of Nepal (Maoist Centre)

Khag Raj Bhatta (Nepali: खग राज भट्ट) is a Nepali politician who has been serving as the Chief Minister of Sudurpaschim Province since 14 August 2026. He has been serving as a member of the Sudurpashchim Provincial Assembly since 30 December 2023. Bhatta has served as a Minister in the Government of Sudurpashchim Province, as the parliamentary party leader of the CPN (Maoist Centre) and as Leader of the Opposition as in the Sudurpashchim Provincial Assembly 10 to 27 February 2023.

Bhatta was reelected as the parliamentary party leader of the CPN (Maoist Centre), assuming the role of Leader of the Opposition in the Sudurpashchim Provincial Assembly 17 May 2025 to 13 August 2026. Following the party merger in 2025 that created the Nepali Communist Party, he was elected as its parliamentary party leader in the Provincial Assembly and continues to serve in that role.
