= Krishna Raj Subedi =

Nepalese politician

- कृष्ण राज सुवेदी

Member of the Sudurpashchim Provincial Assembly
- In office 21 January 2018 – September 2022

Personal details
- Party: Communist Party of Nepal (Unified Marxist–Leninist)
- Other political affiliations: Nepal Communist Party

Krishna Raj Subedi (Nepali: कृष्ण राज सुवेदी) is a Nepalese politician who served as the Minister for Social Development in the Government of Sudurpashchim Province. He was a member of the Sudurpashchim Provincial Assembly, having won the 2017 Nepalese provincial election from Kailali 4 (B) constituency.

== Electoral history ==
=== 2017 Nepalese provincial elections ===
==== Kailali 4 (B) ====
Candidate	Party	Votes	%
Krishna Raj Subedi	CPN (UML)	16,022	54.77
Hira Durra Bhatta	Nepali Congress	11,803	40.35
Others		1,430	4.89
Total		29,255	100.00
Valid votes		29,255	94.73
Invalid/blank votes		1,626	5.27
Total votes		30,881	100.00
CPN (UML) gain			
Source: Election Commission
