= Uma Devi Badi =

Nepali activist

- Born: 1965 (age 60–61); Thapagaun, Nepal
- Occupations: Politician, Human rights activist
- Known for: Leader of the Badi movement in Nepal

Uma Devi Badi (born 1965) is a Provincial Assembly Member of Sudur Paschim Province in Nepal, elected in 2017. She is a human rights activist and the leader of the Badi movement, which has been actively protesting for the recognition of the rights of its community, including end of untouchability and prostitution, land ownership and citizenship.

== Early life ==
Uma Devi Badi was born in 1965 in Thapagaun, in the Salyan District of Nepal. From a young age, she started out life as a prostitute, the only profession available to women of the Badi caste at that point in time. At the age of 21, she married Prem Bhatta, from the Brahmin caste. Their inter-caste marriage created a scandal at the time, since the Badi caste is considered one of the lowest in Nepal and is treated as untouchable. Badi has no children of her own, but instead raised two of her sister's sons.

== Activism ==
Uma Devi Badi refused to settle for society's expectations of women of her caste and escaped life as a prostitute in order to work towards offering her community better opportunities for their future. At the age of 40, with the support of Action Aid, she became head of the local organisation Community Support Group and set up a hostel for 25 boys and girls of the Badi caste in a rented property in Tikapur, western Nepal. The children are given accommodation there and sent to the local school as well as being given extra support after school with their literacy and numeracy skills. The success of this project has led to a larger project currently under construction which aims to host over 100 children in future.

Two years after setting up the hostel, in 2007, Uma Devi Badi became the leader of a movement protesting for the rights of the Badi community. This became known as the 48 day-long Badi movement. During that period, Uma Devi Badi led approximately 500 Badi activists from 23 districts from their villages to Singha Durbar in Kathmandu. Upon their arrival, they staged peaceful protests outside the prime minister's office and the Pashupatinath Temple. Their demands were for the government to enact the 2005 Supreme Court Order to improve the living conditions of the Badi community with a 26-point list of issues to be addressed. These included end of prostitution and untouchability, permanent shelter for an otherwise nomadic community, registration of their births and citizenship in the mother's name for their children. When their demands remained unheard, Uma Devi Badi escalated the protest, removing her clothes from her top half and hanging from the gate of the seat of government while chanting slogans. Other women in the protest followed her example. This behaviour caught the attention of the media and the issue was given international coverage forcing the government int action. On 10 September 2007, the government agreed to meet with Uma Devi Badi and work towards introducing a public residential program for the Badi community.

In recognition of her activism, she was listed as one of BBC's 100 Women during 2018.

== 2017 elections ==
In 2017, Uma Devi Badi was elected as a member of the National Assembly for Province No. 7. She became the first ever elected official representing the Badi community. Uma Devi Badi ran for office citing that, since 2007, the efforts of the Nepalese government to improve living conditions, education and opportunities for the Badi community have been slow. Uma Devi Badi stated that she hoped to accelerate those changes by working from within the government.
