= Mohan Raj Malla =

Nepalese politician (died 2021)

Honourable Mohan Raj Malla
- मोहन राज मल्ल
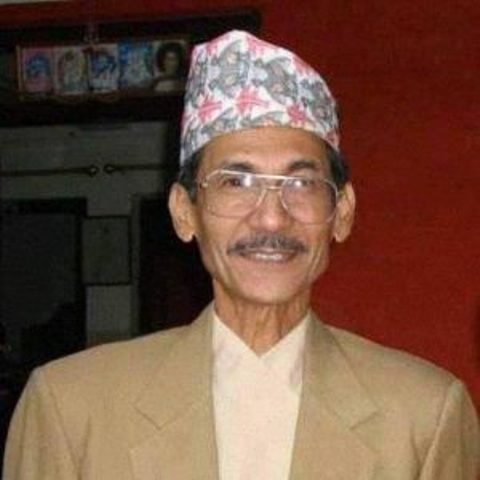

Governor of Sudurpashchim Pradesh
- In office 19 January 2019 – 3 November 2019
- President: Bidhya Devi Bhandari
- Chief Minister: Trilochan Bhatta
- Succeeded by: Sharmila Kumari Panta

Personal details
- Died: 26 May 2021 Kathmandu, Nepal
- Party: Nepali Congress
- Other political affiliations: Rastriya Prajatantra Party
- Education: Master's in Political science
- Alma mater: Tribhuvan University

Mohan Raj Malla (Nepali: मोहन राज मल्ल, died 26 May 2021) was a Nepalese politician and the first Governor of Sudurpashchim Province. He was appointed Governor, as per the Article 163 (2) of the Constitution of Nepal by the President Bidya Devi Bhandari on the recommendation of the Council of Ministers of the Government of Nepal on 19 January 2019. He was also former village assembly chief and national assembly member of the Panchayat regime.

== Political Life ==
He started his political life when he was 21 years old. He served as a member of Rastriya Panchayat for nine years from 1980 to 1989. He was a village chief in Doti for a term and served as the Kailali district assembly vice-president and Tikapur Development Committee chairperson during the Panchayat era. He was also an advisor to the foreign minister. Though he contested elections four times, he had lost. He was leader of Rastriya Prajatantra Party but joined the Nepali Congress before the 2013 Nepalese Constituent Assembly election.

== Death ==
He died while undergoing treatment for COVID-19 at Nidan Hospital, in Lalitpur, on 27 May 2021. He was also suffering from pneumonia and heart problems.

== See also ==
- Governor (Nepal)
- Sudurpashchim Province
