= Sharmila Kumari Panta =

Nepalese politician

Honourable Sharmila Kumari Panta
- सर्मीला कुमारी पन्त

Governor of Sudurpashchim Province
- In office 4 November 2019 – 3 May 2021
- President: Bidhya Devi Bhandari
- Chief Minister: Trilochan Bhatta
- Preceded by: Mohan Raj Malla
- Succeeded by: Ganga Prasad Yadav

Personal details
- Born: Chitwan
- Party: Nepal Communist Party

Sharmila Kumari Panta is a Former Governor of Sudurpashchim Province. She was sworn in on 4 November 2019 by President Bidhya Devi Bhandari. She has been The president of the Disappeared Family Society, Member of Board of Directors of Nepal Airlines Corporation and a Member of Conflict Affected Persons and Structure Data Collection Task Force.

== See also ==
- Somnath Adhikari
- Tilak Pariyar
- Bishnu Prasad Prasain
- Amik Sherchan
- Dharmanath Yadav
- Govinda Prasad Kalauni
