= Kamal Bahadur Shah =

Nepalese politician

Honourable Kamal Bahadur Shah
- कमल बहादुर शाह

Chief Minister of Sudurpashchim Province
- In office 5 August 2024 – 13 August 2026
- President: Ram Chandra Poudel
- Governor: Najir Miya
- Preceded by: Dirgha Bahadur Sodari
- Succeeded by: Khag Raj Bhatta
- In office 10 February 2023 – 17 April 2024
- President: Bidya Devi Bhandari; Ram Chandra Poudel
- Governor: Dev Raj Joshi; Najir Miya
- Preceded by: Rajendra Singh Rawal
- Succeeded by: Dirgha Bahadur Sodari
Other senior positions
Leader of the Opposition in the Sudurpashchim Provincial Assembly
Incumbent
Assumed office 14 August 2026
Chief Minister	Khag Raj Bhatta
Preceded by	Khag Raj Bhatta
In office 18 April 2024 – 4 August 2024
Chief Minister	Dirgha Bahadur Sodari
Preceded by	Rajendra Singh Rawal
Succeeded by	Man Bahadur Dhami
In office 12 January 2023 – 9 February 2023
Chief Minister	Rajendra Singh Rawal
Preceded by	Prakash Bahadur Shah
Succeeded by	Khag Raj Bhatta
Parliamentary Party Leader of the Nepali Congress in the Sudurpashchim Provincial Assembly
Incumbent
Assumed office 4 January 2023
Preceded by	Ran Bahadur Rawal

Member of the Sudurpashchim Provincial Assembly
- Incumbent
- Assumed office 30 December 2022
- Preceded by: Ratan Bahadur Thapa
- Constituency: Kailali 2(A)

Personal details
- Born: Achham District Sudurpashchim Province, Nepal
- Party: Nepali Congress
- Cabinet: Kamal Bahadur Shah cabinet

Kamal Bahadur Shah (Nepali: कमल बहादुर शाह) is a Nepalese politician who has served as the Chief Minister of Sudurpaschim Province from February 2023 to April 2024, and again from August 2024 to August 2026. He is also a member of the Sudurpashchim Provincial Assembly elected from Kailali 2(A).

Shah has been served as the parliamentary party leader of the Nepali Congress in the Assembly since January 2023, and as Leader of the Opposition in the Sudurpashchim Provincial Assembly from January 2023 to February 2023, from April 2024 to August 2024, and again since August 2026.

== Electoral history ==
=== 2022 Nepalese provincial elections ===
Kailali 2(A)
Party	Candidate	Votes
Nepali Congress	Kamal Bahadur Shah	10,433
Nagrik Unmukti Party	Ratan Bahadur Thapa	8,775
CPN (UML)	Kamala Kumari Oli	8,082
Result		Congress hold
Source: Election Commission

=== 2013 Nepalese Constituent Assembly election ===
Party	Candidate	Votes
CPN (Unified Marxist–Leninist)	Mohan Singh Rathore	11,932
Nepali Congress	Kamal Bahadur Shah	8,396
UCPN (Maoist)	Bhim Bahadur Kadayat Chhetri	5,952
Madheshi Janaadhikar Forum, Nepal (Democratic)	Bilari Tharu	4,348
Tharuhat Terai Party Nepal	Bir Bahadur Dagaura	2,934
Others		2,868
Result	CPN (UML) gain	
Source: NepalNews

== See also ==
- Kamal Bahadur Shah cabinet
- Bahadur Singh Lama
- Surendra Raj Pandey

Political offices
Preceded by Rajendra Singh Rawal	Chief Minister of Sudurpashchim Province; 2023-	Succeeded by incumbent
