= Dadeldhura 1 =

Parliamentary constituency in Nepal

- Parliamentary constituency for the House of Representatives
- Dadeldhura 1 Sudurpashchim Province; Protected areas in green

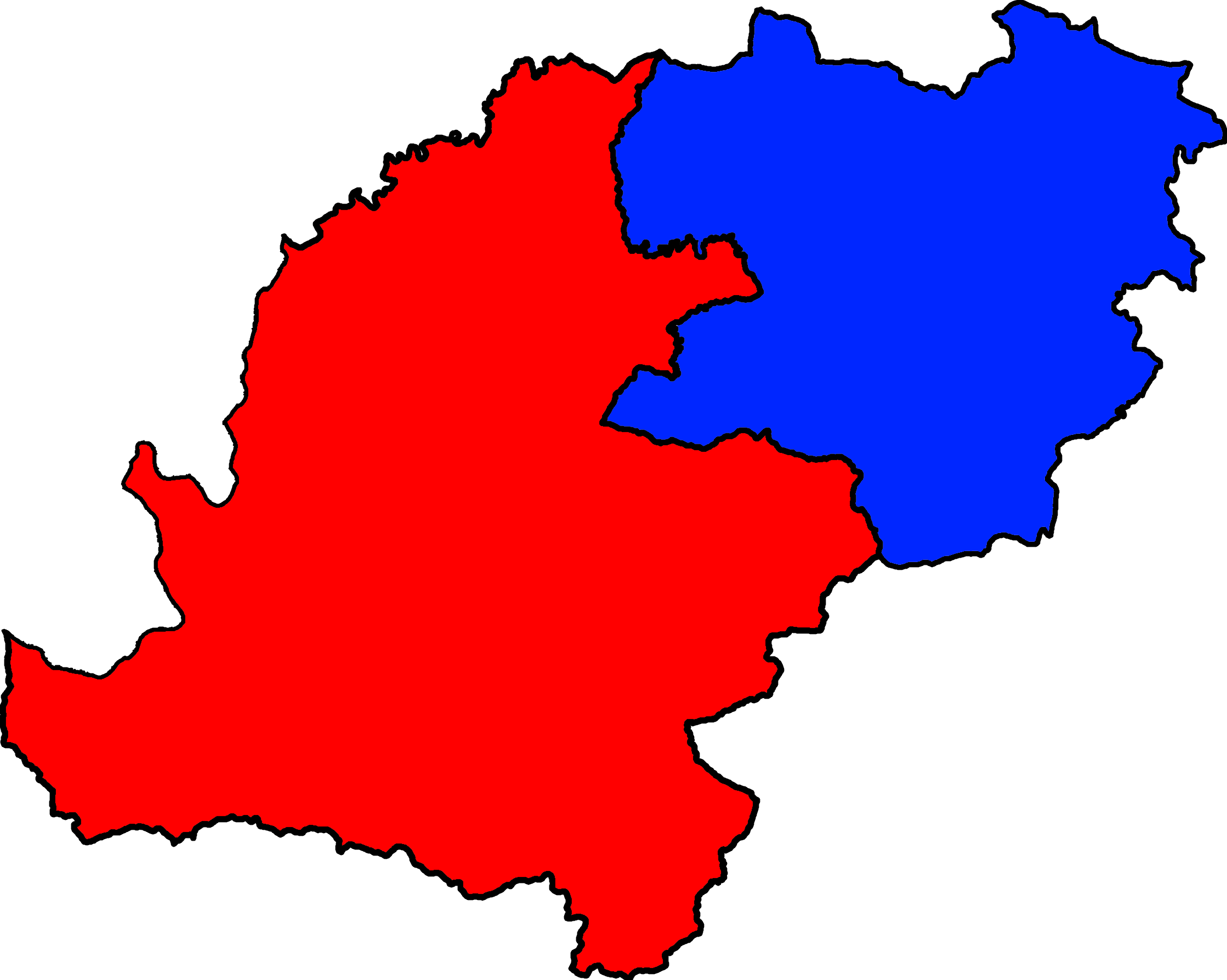
- Assembly segments Dadeldhura 1(A) (red) and Dadeldhura 1(B) (blue) within Dadeldhura District
- Province: Sudurpashchim Province
- District: Dadeldhura District
- Electorate: 81,736

Current constituency
- Created: 1991
- MP: Tara Prasad Joshi
- Sudurpashchim MPA 1(A): Pathan Singh Bohora (NCP)
- Sudurpashchim MPA 1(B): Karna Bahadur Malla (NC)

Dadeldhura 1 is the parliamentary constituency of Dadeldhura District in Nepal. This constituency came into existence on the Constituency Delimitation Commission (CDC) report submitted on 31 August 2017.

== Incorporated areas ==
Dadeldhura 1 incorporates the entirety of Dadeldhura District.

== Assembly segments ==
It encompasses the following Sudurpashchim Provincial Assembly segment

- Dadeldhura 1(A)
- Dadeldhura 1(B)

== Members of Parliament ==
=== Parliament/Constituent Assembly ===
| Election | Member | Party |
|---|---|---|
| 1991 | Sher Bahadur Deuba | Nepali Congress |

=== Provincial Assembly ===
==== 1(A) ====
| Election | Member | Party |
|---|---|---|
| 2017 | Pathan Singh Bohora | CPN (Unified Marxist-Leninist) |
| May 2018 | Pathan Singh Bohora | Nepal Communist Party |

==== 1(B) ====
| Election | Member | Party |
|---|---|---|
| 2017 | Karna Bahadur Malla | Nepali Congress |

== Election results ==
=== Election in the 2020s ===
==== 2022 general election ====
| Candidate | Party | Votes | % |
|---|---|---|---|
| Sher Bahadur Deuba | Nepali Congress | 25,534 | 53.18 |
| Sagar Dhakal | Independent | 13,042 | 27.16 |
| Karna Bahadur Malla | Nepali Congress (B.P.) | 7,535 | 15.69 |
| Others | | 1,905 | 3.97 |
| Total | | 48,016 | 100.00 |
| Majority | | 12,492 | |
| Nepali Congress hold | | | |

=== Election in the 2010s ===
==== 2017 legislative elections ====
| Party | Candidate | Votes |
|---|---|---|
| Nepali Congress | Sher Bahaur Deuba | 28,446 |
| CPN (Maoist Centre) | Khem Raj Bhatta | 21,498 |
| Others | | 1,183 |
| Invalid votes | | 2,932 |
| Result | Congress hold | |
Source: Election Commission

==== 2017 Nepalese provincial elections ====
===== 1(A) =====
| Party | Candidate | Votes |
|---|---|---|
| CPN (Unified Marxist-Leninist) | Pathan Singh Bohora | 13,563 |
| Nepali Congress | Raghubar Bhatta | 11,394 |
| Others | | 217 |
| Invalid votes | | 1,044 |
| Result | CPN (UML) gain | |
Source: Election Commission

===== 1(B) =====
| Party | Candidate | Votes |
|---|---|---|
| Nepali Congress | Karna Bahadur Malla | 13,413 |
| CPN (Unified Marxist-Leninist) | Tara Prasad Joshi | 13,057 |
| Others | | 146 |
| Invalid votes | | 1,108 |
| Result | Congress gain | |
Source: Election Commission

==== 2013 Constituent Assembly election ====
| Party | Candidate | Votes |
|---|---|---|
| Nepali Congress | Sher Bahaur Deuba | 23,920 |
| UCPN (Maoist) | Khem Raj Bhatta | 12,493 |
| CPN (Unified Marxist–Leninist) | Tara Prasad Joshi | 7,190 |
| Others | | 3,733 |
| Result | Congress hold | |
Source: NepalNews

=== Election in the 2000s ===
==== 2008 Constituent Assembly election ====
| Party | Candidate | Votes |
|---|---|---|
| Nepali Congress | Sher Bahaur Deuba | 20,529 |
| CPN (Maoist) | Khem Raj Bhatta | 19,161 |
| CPN (Unified Marxist–Leninist) | Bikram Bahadur Shahi | 7,982 |
| Janamorcha Nepal | Jagat Bahadur Parki | 1,813 |
| Rastriya Prajatantra Party | Hikmat Singh Saud | 1,108 |
| Others | | 1,275 |
| Invalid votes | | 2,926 |
| Result | Congress hold | |
Source: Election Commission

=== Election in the 1990s ===
==== 1999 legislative elections ====
| Party | Candidate | Votes |
|---|---|---|
| Nepali Congress | Sher Bahaur Deuba | 28,651 |
| CPN (Unified Marxist–Leninist) | Bageshowori Dutt Chataut | 7,840 |
| Rastriya Prajatantra Party (Chand) | Ganesh Prasad Bhatt | 4,893 |
| CPN (Marxist–Leninist) | Krishna Raj Ojha | 1,546 |
| Others | | 1,366 |
| Invalid votes | | 1,363 |
| Result | Congress hold | |
Source: Election Commission

==== 1994 legislative elections ====
| Party | Candidate | Votes |
|---|---|---|
| Nepali Congress | Sher Bahaur Deuba | 20,701 |
| CPN (Unified Marxist–Leninist) | Khem Raj Mayal | 9,966 |
| Rastriya Prajatantra Party | Lal B. Khadyat | 2,852 |
| Result | Congress hold | |
Source: Election Commission

==== 1991 legislative elections ====
| Party | Candidate | Votes |
|---|---|---|
| Nepali Congress | Sher Bahaur Deuba | 24,570 |
| CPN (Unified Marxist–Leninist) | | 6,628 |
| Result | Congress gain | |

== See also ==
- List of parliamentary constituencies of Nepal
