= Najir Miya =

Governor of Sudurpaschim

The Honourable Najir Miya

Governor of Sudurpashchim Province
- Incumbent
- Assumed office 15 March 2024
- President: Ram Chandra Poudel
- Prime Minister: Pushpa Kamal Dahal; K. P. Sharma Oli; Sushila Karki; Balendra Shah
- Chief Minister: Dirgha Sodari; Kamal Shah; Khag Raj Bhatta
- Preceded by: Dev Raj Joshi

Member of the Constituent Assembly for CPN-UML party list
- In office 27 May 2008 – 28 May 2012
- Constituency: Party list

Personal details
- Born: 29 January 1952 (age 74) Panini, Arghakhanchi, Nepal
- Party: CPN (UML) (before 2024)
- Spouse: Hajjin Ujeli Miya

Najir Miya (born 29 January 1952) is a Nepalese politician who has served as the Governor of Sudurpaschim Province since 12 March 2024.
