= Ganga Prasad Yadav =

Nepalese politician

Honourable Ganga Prasad Yadav
- गंगा प्रसाद यादव

Governor of Sudurpashchim Province
- In office 3 May 2021 – 9 November 2021
- President: Bidhya Devi Bhandari
- Chief Minister: Trilochan Bhatta
- Preceded by: Sharmila Kumari Panta
- Succeeded by: Dev Raj Joshi

Deputy Speaker of Constituent Assembly of Nepal
- In office 19 October 2015 – 15 October 2017
- President: Ram Baran Yadav; Bidya Devi Bhandari

Personal details
- Born: Janakpurdham
- Party: Madhesi
- Website: oph.p7.gov.np/node/169

Ganga Prasad Yadav (Nepali: गंगा प्रसाद यादव) is a former Governor of Sudurpashchim Province. He was appointed Governor, as per the Article 163 (2) of the Constitution of Nepal by the President Bidya Devi Bhandari on the recommendation of the Council of Ministers of the Government of Nepal on 3 May 2021. He also served as a Deputy Speaker of Constituent Assembly of Nepal.

== See also ==
- Somnath Adhikari
- Rajesh Jha
- Bishnu Prasad Prasain
- Sita Kumari Poudel
- Dharmanath Yadav
- Govinda Prasad Kalauni
