= Trilochan Bhatta =

Nepalese politician (born 1969)

- त्रिलोचन भट्ट
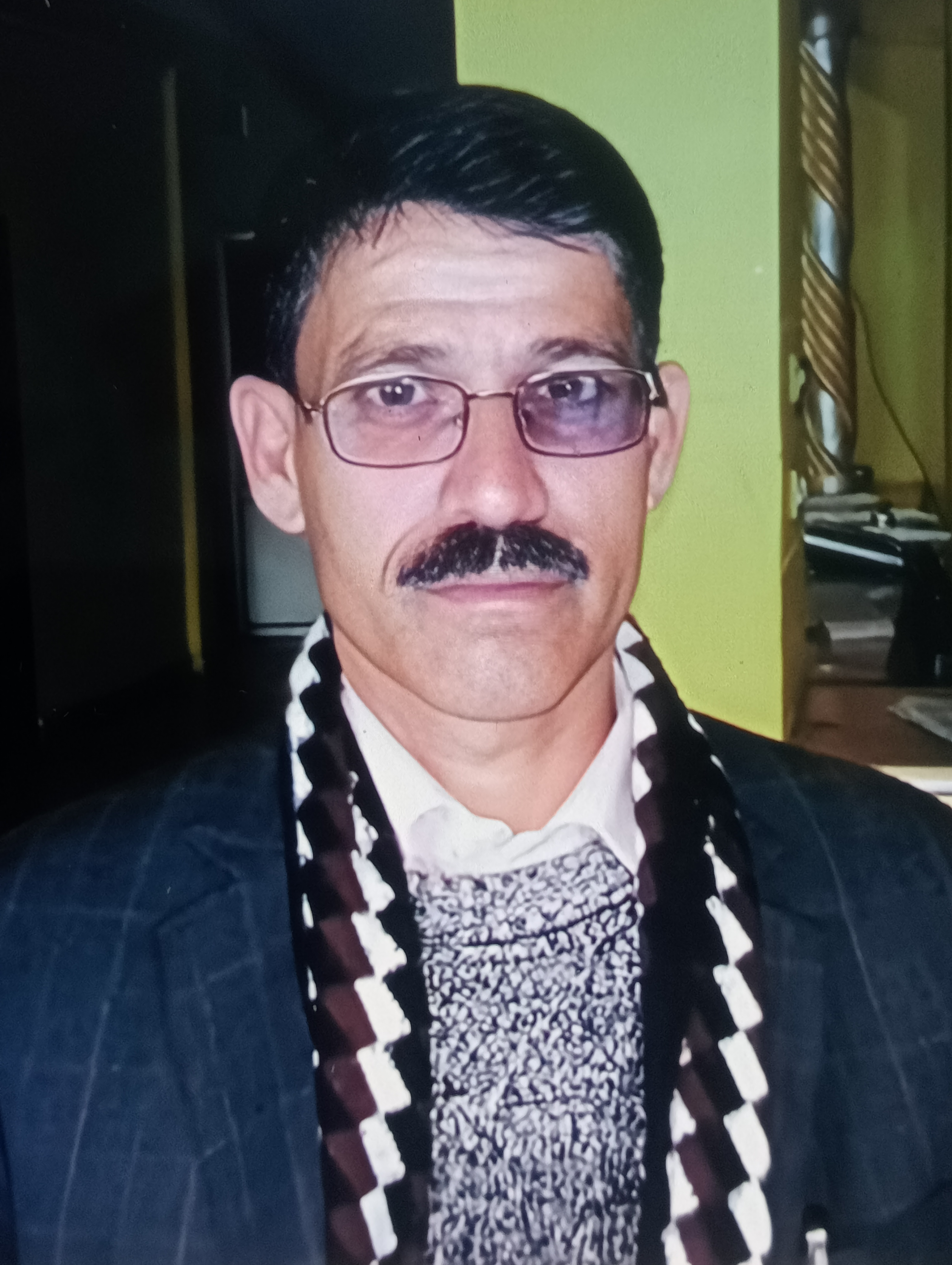

1st Chief Minister of Sudurpashchim Province
- In office 15 February 2018 – 9 February 2023
- Governor: Mohan Raj Malla; Sharmila Kumari Panta; Ganga Prasad Yadav; Dev Raj Joshi

Province Assembly Member of Sudurpashchim Province
- Incumbent
- Assumed office 2017
- Constituency: Doti 1B

Personal details
- Born: May 20, 1969 (age 56) Phaledi (now K.I. Singh Rural Municipality), Doti, Sudurpashchim Province, Nepal
- Party: Communist Party of Nepal (Maoist Centre)
- Website: p7ocmcm.gov.np

Trilochan Bhatta (Nepali: त्रिलोचन भट्ट) is a Nepalese politician and former Chief Minister of Sudurpashchim Province, a one of seven provinces in Nepal. He was unanimously selected Parliamentary Party leader of Communist Party of Nepal for Sudurpashchim pradesh on 12 February 2018. He was appointed as the chief minister, according to Article 168 (1) of the Constitution of Nepal and took the oath of his office and secrecy as a chief minister on 17 February 2018.

== Early life ==
Trilochan Bhatta was born in Phaledi (now K.I. Singh Rural Municipality), Doti, Nepal to Prasad Bhatta and Sharada Devi Bhatta.

== See also ==
- Rajendra Kumar Rai
- Lalbabu Raut
- Rajendra Prasad Pandey
- Krishna Chandra Nepali
- Kul Prasad KC
- Jeevan Bahadur Shahi

Political offices
Preceded by Constitution created	Chief Minister of Sudurpashchim Province; 2018	Incumbent
