= Dev Raj Joshi =

Nepalese politician

Honourable Dev Raj Joshi
- देवराज जोशी

4th Governor of Sudurpashchim Province
- In office 9 November 2021 – 14 March 2024
- President: Bidya Devi Bhandari
- Prime Minister: Sher Bahadur Deuba
- Chief Minister: Kamal Bahadur Shah
- Preceded by: Ganga Prasad Yadav
- Succeeded by: Najir Miya

Member of the Constituent Assembly
- In office 28 May 2008 – 28 May 2012
- Preceded by: Janak Raj Giri (as Member of Parliament)
- Succeeded by: Karna Bahadur Thapa
- Constituency: Bajura 1

Member of Parliament, Pratinidhi Sabha
- In office 20 June 1991 – 11 July 1994
- Preceded by: Constituency created
- Succeeded by: Hikmat Bahadur Shahi
- Constituency: Bajura 1

Personal details
- Born: Bajura District
- Party: Nepali Congress (?-2021)

Dev Raj Joshi (Nepali: देवराज जोशी) is a Nepalese politician, belonging to the Nepali Congress. He was Appointed Governor, as per the Article 163 (2) of the Constitution of Nepal by the President Bidya Devi Bhandari on the recommendation of the Council of Ministers of the Government of Nepal on 9 November 2021. In the 2008 Constituent Assembly election he was elected from the Bajura-1 constituency, winning 19271 votes.
