= Nepali Communist Party =

Communist party in Nepal

Nepali Communist Party नेपाली कम्युनिष्ट पार्टी Nepālī Kamyuniṣṭa Pārṭī
- Abbreviation: NCP नेकपा
- Presidium: Secretariat of the NCP
- Coordinator: Pushpa Kamal Dahal
- Co-coordinator: Madhav Kumar Nepal
- Founded: 5 November 2025
- Merger of: Maoist Centre; Unified Socialist; NSP; CPN (Socialist); Samyabadi; Jana Samajbadi; Maoist-Socialist; DSM; Faction of CPN
- Headquarters: Tinkune, Kathmandu
- Ideology: Communism (Nepali); Marxism–Leninism
- Political position: Left-wing
- International affiliation: Sovintern
- Colors: Red
- Anthem: "The Internationale"
- ECN Status: National Party (4th largest)
- House of Representatives: 17 / 275
- National Assembly: 18 / 59
- Provincial Assemblies: 107 / 550
- Chief Ministers: 2 / 7
- Mayors/Chairs: 146 / 753
- Councillors: 6,030 / 35,011

Election symbol

Party flag

Website
- nepalicommunist.org

The Nepali Communist Party (Note: Nepali: नेपाली कम्युनिष्ट पार्टी, romanized: Nēpāli kamyuniṣṭa pārṭī) (NCP) (Note: NeKaPa/नेकपा) is a Marxist-Leninist party in Nepal. A unity conference was held on 5 November 2025, at Bhrikutimandap which declared the party's formation through a merger of ten leftist parties and groups. The merger includes the CPN (Maoist Centre), CPN (Unified Socialist), Jana Samajbadi Party, Nepal Samajbadi Party, the Biplav-split CPN, CPN Samajbadi, CPN (Maoist Samajbadi), CPN (Samyabadi), and the Deshbhakta Samajbadi Morcha led by Gopal Kiranti.

The unification was completed by the Party Unification Coordination Committee after a month of negotiation. The two major predecessor parties subsequently dissolved, making way for the new united party. The party adopted a star as their electoral symbol.

Upon creation, the party is the largest political party in the National Assembly and largest communist party in the provincial assemblies of Bagmati, Karnali and Sudurpashchim Provinces. Former prime minister of Nepal Pushpa Kamal Dahal serves as coordinator and Madhav Kumar Nepal serves as the joint coordinator of the party while former prime minister Jhala Nath Khanal remains on third rank.

== Background ==
The CPN (Maoist Centre) had formed a task force in 2023 to unify splinter communist groups and launched formal and informal talks with the Nepal Socialist Party and Communist Party Nepal to bring back the splinter groups into the party.

The CPN (Unified Socialist) which was formed after a split with CPN (UML) merged with the CPN (Unity National Campaign), another splinter group from the CPN (UML), in July 2025. The party also held talks with the CPN (Maoist Centre) but the merger between the two parties failed to materialize.

The Socialist Front was a political alliance formed by CPN (Maoist Centre), People's Socialist Party, Nepal, CPN (Unified Socialist), Communist Party Nepal in 2023 with the goal of strengthening the socialist movement in the country. The front remained largely inactive until CPN (Maoist Centre) chairman Pushpa Kamal Dahal resigned as prime minister in July 2024. The People's Socialist Party, Nepal left the front while a faction of Nepal Socialist Party led-by Mahindra Ray Yadav joined the front.

Following the 2025 Gen Z protests, the CPN (Maoist Centre) intensified calls for a broader leftist unity within the country and dissolved its Central Committee to hold a general convention. In November 2025, the Central Committee of the CPN (Unified Socialist) formally endorsed the unification proposal with a majority and the Secretariat of the CPN (Maoist Centre) also decided to advance with the unification. Following the decision the two parties along with the Nepal Socialist Party, CPN (Socialist), Jana Samajbadi Party, CPN (Maoist–Socialist), CPN (Samyabadi) and a faction of the Communist Party Nepal signed an agreement to unify their parties.

The unification was formally concluded on 5 November 2025, with the unified party being called the Nepali Communist Party with Pushpa Kamal Dahal acting as the coordinator of the party and Madhav Kumar Nepal as the co-cordinator.

In the leader up to the general elections, Matribhumi Jagaran Abhiyan Nepal led by former CPN (UML) politician Bhim Rawal, Nagrik Unmukti Party, factions of People's Socialist Party and Rastriya Mukti Party Nepal, and other smaller leftist groups merged with the party.

== Ideology ==
The party’s guiding ideology is Marxism–Leninism, while its program is based on scientific socialism with Nepali characteristics. It is positioned on the left.

=== Election Manifesto 2082 ===
The Nepali Communist Party (NCP) has become the first major party to release its election manifesto. The letter, released by its coordinator Pushpa Kamal Dahal ‘Prachanda’, puts forward the main slogans ‘Good governance and employment are the preparations for socialism, and the protection of nationality and democracy is our responsibility’.

For their strategic objective, the party aimed for scientific socialism, which they define as a system ensuring food, housing, clothing, education, health, and employment for all, with collective ownership of production.

For its political positioning they presented themselves as the only “Revolutionary Force” with a clear socialist direction, contrasting with “Status-Quo” forces (NC, UML), “Populist” forces, and “Regressive” forces (RPP).

The NCP also affirmed its commitment to federalism and the fight against corruption.

== Electoral performance ==
=== Federal parliament ===
| Election | Leader | Constituency Votes | | Proportional Votes | | Seats | Position | Resulting government |
| Election | Leader | No. | % | No. | % | No. | Position | Resulting government |
|---|---|---|---|---|---|---|---|---|
| 2026 | Pushpa Kamal Dahal | 976,016 | 9.27 | 811,577 | 7.49 | 17 / 275 | 4th | In opposition |

== Presence in various provinces ==
| Province | Seats | Size |
|---|---|---|
| Koshi | 17 / 93 | Third largest |
| Madhesh | 16 / 107 | Fourth largest |
| Bagmati | 28 / 110 | Second largest |
| Gandaki | 10 / 60 | Third largest |
| Lumbini | 14 / 87 | Third largest |
| Karnali | 14 / 40 | Second largest |
| Sudurpashchim | 22 / 53 | Largest |

== Leadership ==
=== Coordinator ===
- Pushpa Kamal Dahal

=== Joint-coordinator ===
- Madhav Kumar Nepal

== See also ==
- Communism in Nepal
- List of communist parties in Nepal
