= 2017 Nepalese provincial elections =

2017 Nepalese provincial assembly elections
- 26 November; 7 December 2017

All 550 seats in the 7 provincial assemblies
- Registered: 15,427,731
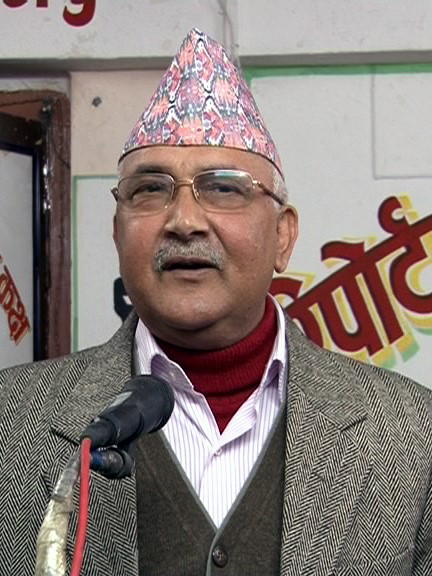

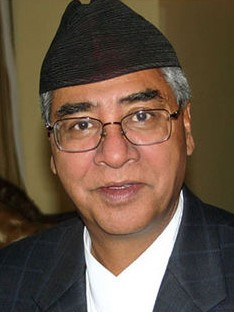

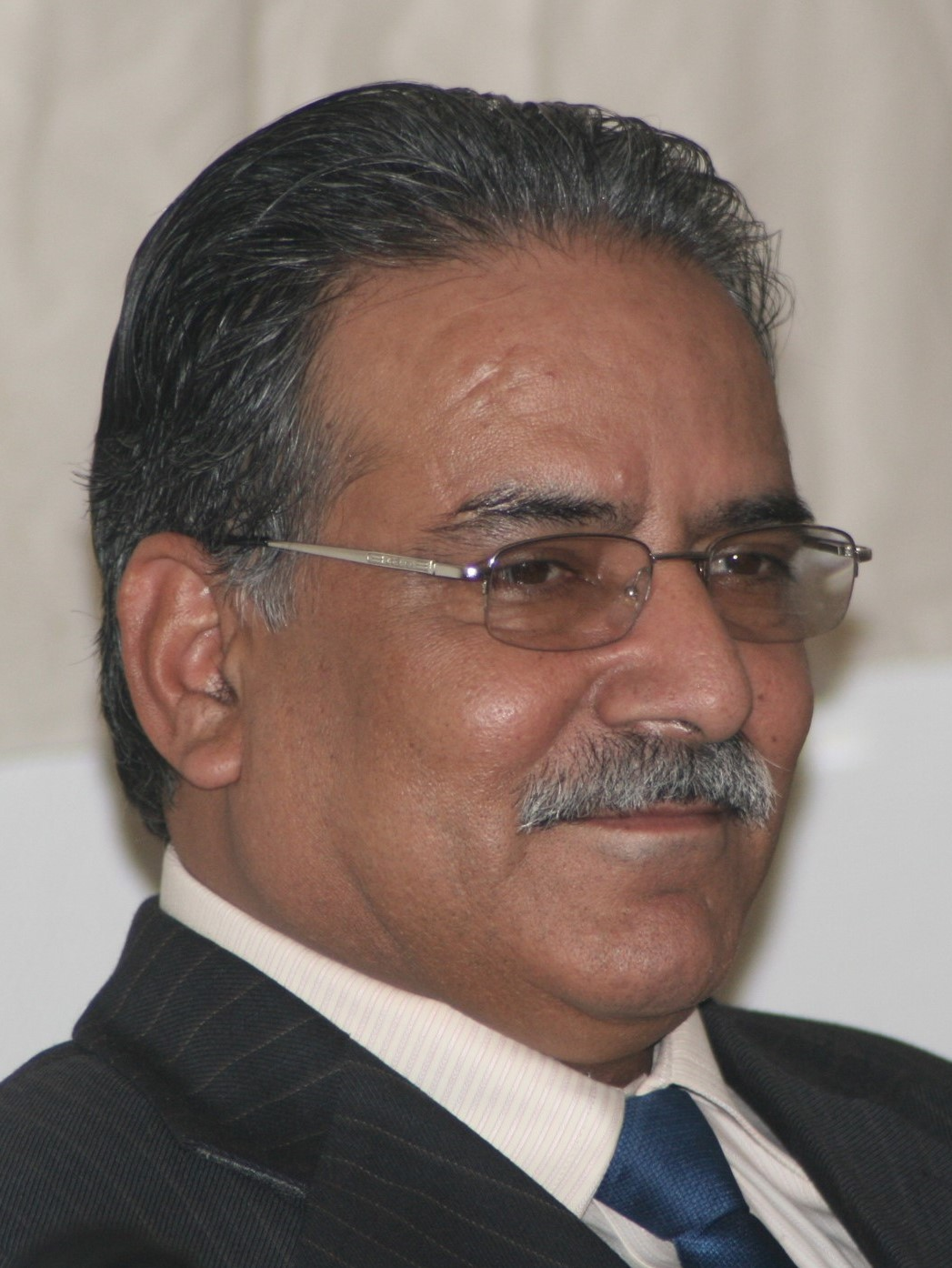

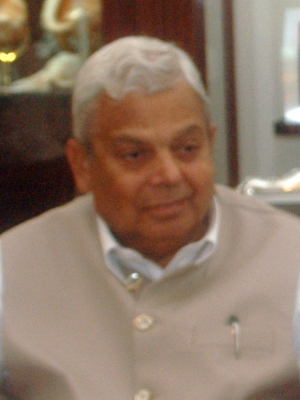

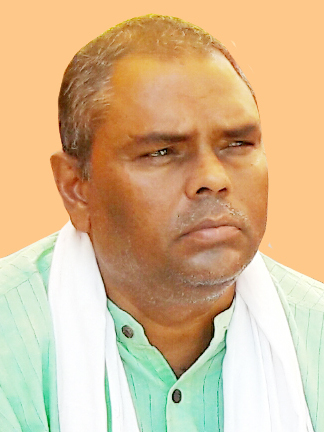

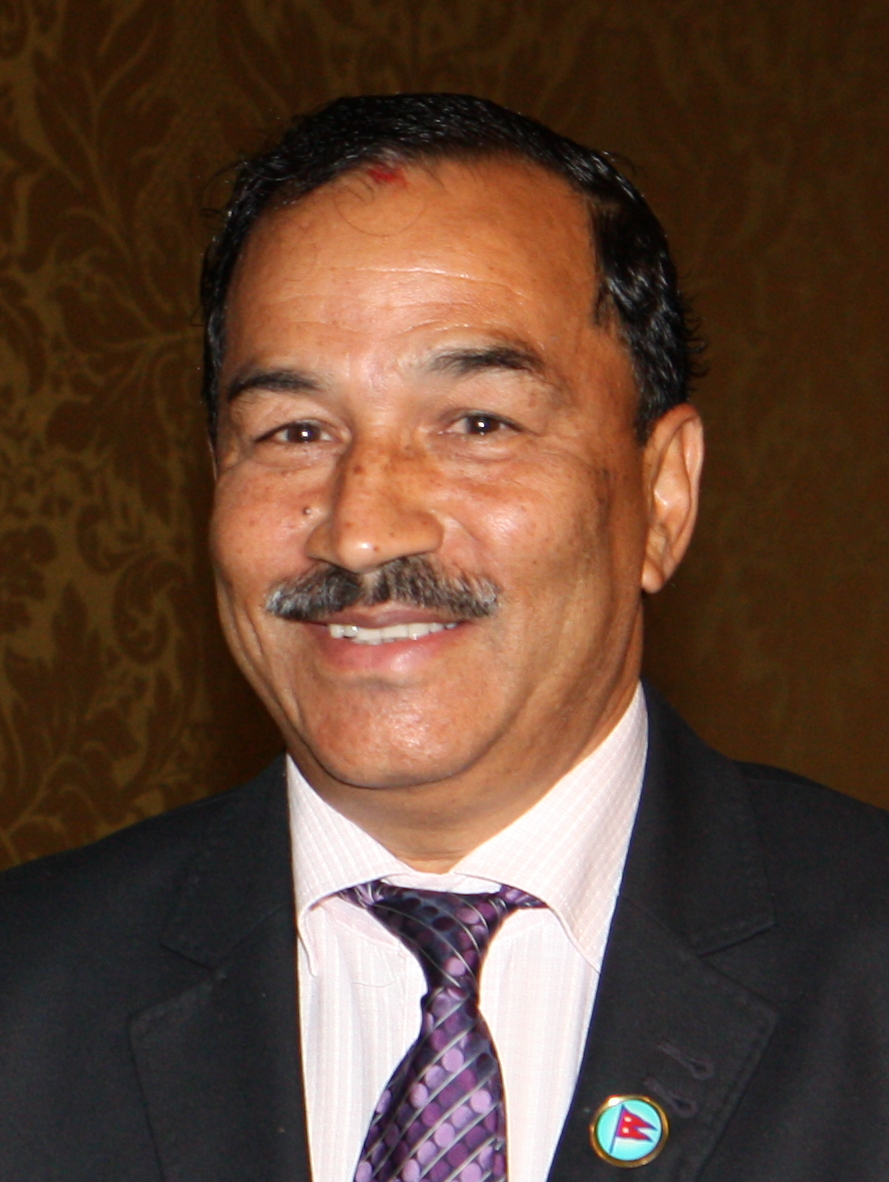
	First party	Second party	Third party
Leader	Khadga Prasad Oli	Sher Bahadur Deuba	Pushpa Kamal Dahal
Party	CPN (UML)	Congress	Maoist Centre
Leader since	July 2014	7 March 2016	May 1999
Seats won	243	113	108
Seat change	First provincial election	First provincial election	First provincial election
	Fourth party	Fifth party	Sixth party
Leader	Mahantha Thakur	Upendra Yadav	Kamal Thapa
Party	RJPN	FSFN	RPP
Leader since	21 April 2017	15 July 2015	20 February 2017
Seats won	28	37	4
Seat change	First provincial election	First provincial election	First provincial election

Provincial assembly elections were held in Nepal on 26 November and 7 December 2017 along with the general election. 330 seats in the seven newly created provincial assemblies were elected by first-past-the-post voting and 220 by proportional representation. The election was part of Nepal's transformation to a federal republic. The next Election will be held in 2022 unless dissolved earlier without completing the five years term. 2022 Nepalese provincial election will be the second election for provinces after completion of tenure of five years.

== Electoral system ==
The 550 members of the provincial assemblies will be elected by two methods; 330 will be elected from single-member constituencies by first-past-the-post voting and 220 seats will be elected by closed list proportional representation for parties gathering more than 1.5% of the votes. Each voter will get separate ballot papers for the two methods.

=== Eligibility to vote ===
To vote in the general election, one must be:

- on the electoral roll
- aged 18
- a citizen of Nepal
- of sound mind
- not ineligible as per federal election fraud and punishment laws

=== Timetable ===
The key dates are listed below

19 August	Last day to register to be on electoral roll
21 August	Cabinet announces election date
27 August	Last day for party registration at Election Commission
30 August	Election code of conduct starts
14 October	Tenure of Legislature parliament ends
15 October	Parties submit preliminary closed list for proportional representation
22 October	Candidate nomination for first phase of first past the post
2 November	Candidate nomination for second phase of first past the post
19 November	Closed list for proportional representation finalized and published
26 November	Election day (first phase) – polling centres open 07:00 to 17:00
7 December	Election day (second phase) – polling centres open 07:00 to 17:00

The first phase of the election was carried out on 26 November 2017 in 32 mountainous and hilly districts. The counting of the votes of the first phase will also only begin once the second phase is conducted.

== Results ==
=== Overall ===
Summary of the 2017 Nepalese provincial election results
Party	FPTP			PR			Total
Party	Votes	%	Seats	Votes	%	Seats	Total
CPN (Unified Marxist–Leninist)	3,041,962	28.75	168	2,938,584	32.58	75	243
Nepali Congress	3,635,179	34.35	41	2,869,418	31.81	72	113
CPN (Maoist Centre)	1,664,042	16.43	73	1,325,048	14.69	35	108
Federal Socialist Forum, Nepal	531,900	5.03	24	447,787	4.96	13	37
Rastriya Janata Party Nepal	409,360	3.87	16	432,591	4.80	12	28
Rastriya Prajatantra Party	84,272	0.80	0	203,586	2.26	3	3
Bibeksheel Sajha Party	98,636	0.93	0	198,649	2.20	3	3
Rastriya Prajatantra Party (Democratic)	34,590	0.33	0	92,601	1.03	1	1
Naya Shakti Party, Nepal	92,533	0.87	2	88,199	0.98	1	3
Rastriya Janamorcha	55,808	0.53	2	64,424	0.71	2	4
Nepal Majdoor Kisan Party	50,714	0.48	1	57,185	0.63	1	2
Nepal Federal Socialist Party	19,544	0.18	0	37,179	0.41	1	1
Sanghiya Loktantrik Rastriya Manch	23,044	0.22	0	26,282	0.29	1	1
Others	215,932	2.04	0	237,764	2.64	0	0
Independent	173,687	1.64	3	–	–	–	3
Invalid/Blank votes	450,484	–	–	1,531,223	–	–	–
Total	10,581,687	100	330	10,550,520	100	220	550
Registered voters/turnout	15,428,160	68.59	–	15,428,160	68.38	–	–
Source: Election Commission of Nepal

=== Koshi Province ===
Party	FPTP			PR			Total
Party	Votes	%	Seats	Votes	%	Seats	Total
CPN (Unified Marxist–Leninist)	720,339	37.30	36	673,709	38.79	15	51
Nepali Congress	739,937	38.31	8	586,246	33.76	13	21
CPN (Maoist Centre)	259,025	13.41	10	206,781	11.91	5	15
Federal Socialist Forum, Nepal	91,771	4.75	1	70,476	4.06	2	3
Rastriya Prajatantra Party	4,867	0.25	0	57,342	3.30	1	1
Sanghiya Loktantrik Rastriya Manch	22,493	1.16	0	26,123	1.50	1	1
Others	78,748	4.08	0	115,945	6.68	0	0
Independent	14,257	0.74	1	–	–	–	1
Invalid/Blank votes	88,998	–	–	276,409	–	–	–
Total	2,020,435	100	56	2,013,031	100	37	93
Registered voters/turnout	2,993,774	67.49	–	2,993,774	67.24	–	–
Source: Election Commission of Nepal

=== Madhesh Province ===
Party	FPTP			PR			Total
Party	Votes	%	Seats	Votes	%	Seats	Total
Nepali Congress	509,139	27.82	8	370,550	24.11	11	19
Rastriya Janata Party Nepal	303,041	16.56	15	318,524	20.72	10	25
Federal Socialist Forum, Nepal	326,298	17.83	20	284,072	18.48	9	29
CPN (Unified Marxist-Leninist)	282,718	15.45	14	249,734	16.25	7	21
CPN (Maoist Centre)	234,160	12.80	6	182,619	11.88	5	11
Nepal Federal Socialist Party	17,976	0.98	0	32,864	2.14	1	1
Others	66,633	3.65	0	98,808	6.42	0	0
Independent	89,842	4.91	1	–	–	–	1
Invalid/Blank votes	98,959	–	–	374,853	–	–	–
Total	1,928,766	100	64	1,912,024	100	43	107
Registered voters/turnout	2,767,379	69.69	–	2,767,379	69.09	–	–
Source: Election Commission of Nepal

=== Bagmati Province ===
Party	FPTP			PR			Total
Party	Votes	%	Seats	Votes	%	Seats	Total
CPN (Unified Marxist-Leninist)	725,113	35.37	42	677,317	35.81	16	58
Nepali Congress	748,207	36.50	7	559,249	29.57	14	21
CPN (Maoist Centre)	355,126	16.32	15	316,876	16.75	8	23
Bibeksheel Sajha Party	74,656	3.64	0	124,442	6.58	3	3
Rastriya Prajatantra Party	27,960	1.36	0	59,268	3.13	1	1
Nepal Mazdoor Kisan Party	40,502	1.98	1	41,610	2.20	1	2
Rastriya Prajatantra Party (Democratic)	1,399	0.07	0	28,855	1.53	1	1
Naya Shakti Party, Nepal	21,552	1.05	1	23,958	1.27	0	1
Others	50,791	3.48	0	59,731	3.16	0	0
Independent	4,688	0.23	0	–	–	–	0
Invalid/Blank votes	70,471	–	–	226,043	–	–	–
Total	2,120,465	100	66	2,117,314	100	44	110
Registered voters/turnout	3,074,381	68.97	–	3,074,381	68.87	–	–
Source: Election Commission of Nepal

=== Gandaki Province ===
Party	FPTP			PR			Total
Party	Votes	%	Seats	Votes	%	Seats	Total
CPN (Unified Marxist-Leninist)	268,540	26.09	17	373,501	39.04	10	27
Nepali Congress	424,202	41.21	6	364,797	38.13	9	15
CPN (Maoist Centre)	242,635	23.57	9	119,528	12.49	3	12
Naya Shakti Party, Nepal	21,259	2.07	1	24,625	2.57	1	2
Rastriya Janamorcha	29,968	2.91	2	19,376	2.03	1	3
Others	39,169	3.79	0	54,992	5.75	0	0
Independent	3,666	0.36	1	–	–	–	1
Invalid/Blank votes	29,039	–	–	101,007	–	–	–
Total	1,058,478	100	36	1,057,826	100	24	60
Registered voters/turnout	1,568,924	67.47	–	1,568,924	67.42	–	–
Source: Election Commission of Nepal

=== Lumbini Province ===
Party	FPTP			PR			Total
Party	Votes	%	Seats	Votes	%	Seats	Total
CPN (Unified Marxist-Leninist)	572,942	31.35	28	533,613	33.10	13	41
Nepali Congress	646,200	35.36	7	530,844	32.93	12	19
CPN (Maoist Centre)	285,878	14.64	14	239,281	14.84	6	20
Federal Socialist Forum, Nepal	97,892	5.36	3	78,567	4.87	2	5
Rastriya Janata Party Nepal	54,529	2.98	0	54,110	3.36	1	1
Rastriya Janamorcha	15,803	0.86	0	32,546	2.02	1	1
Others	105,363	6.77	0	143,219	8.88	0	0
Independent	49,024	2.68	0	–	–	–	0
Invalid/Blank votes	90,857	–	–	306,734	–	–	–
Total	1,918,488	100	52	1,918,914	100	35	87
Registered voters/turnout	2,740,867	70.03	–	2,740,867	70.01	–	–
Source: Election Commission of Nepal

=== Karnali Province ===
Party	FPTP			PR			Total
Party	Votes	%	Seats	Votes	%	Seats	Total
CPN (Unified Marxist-Leninist)	180,952	32.58	14	169,755	34.35	6	20
Nepali Congress	210,290	37.86	1	162,003	32.78	5	6
CPN (Maoist Centre)	128,805	23.19	9	117,298	23.74	4	13
Rastriya Prajatantra Party	6,290	1.13	0	15,629	3.16	1	1
Others	21,500	3.88	0	29,477	5.97	0	0
Independent	7,580	1.36	0	–	–	–	0
Invalid/Blank votes	26,511	–	–	87,910	–	–	–
Total	581,948	100	24	582,072	100	16	40
Registered voters/turnout	847,162	68.69	–	847,162	68.71	–	–
Source: Election Commission of Nepal

=== Sudurpashchim Province ===
Party	FPTP			PR			Total
Party	Votes	%	Seats	Votes	%	Seats	Total
Nepali Congress	357,204	39.37	4	295,729	37.38	8	12
CPN (Unified Marxist-Leninist)	291,358	32.11	17	260,955	32.99	8	25
CPN (Maoist Centre)	166,513	18.35	10	142,702	18.04	4	14
Rastriya Janata Party Nepal	32,400	3.57	1	36,902	4.66	1	2
Others	55,269	5.49	0	54,784	6.93	0	0
Independent	4,630	0.51	0	–	–	–	0
Invalid/Blank votes	45,649	–	–	158,267	–	–	–
Total	953,033	100	32	949,339	100	21	53
Registered voters/turnout	1,435,673	66.38	–	1,435,673	66.13	–	–
Source: Election Commission of Nepal

== See also ==
- 2017 Nepalese general election
- 2017 Nepalese local elections
