= Sudurpashchim Provincial Assembly =

Provincial legislative body in Nepal

Sudurpashchim Provincial Assembly सुदूरपश्चिम प्रदेश सभा
- 2nd Sudurpashchim Provincial Assembly

Type
- Type: Unicameral legislature of Sudurpashchim Province

History
- Founded: 2018

Leadership
- Speaker: Bhim Bahadur Bhandari, NCP since 17 January 2023
- Deputy Speaker: Koili Devi Chaudhary, CPN (UML) since 18 January 2023
- Leader of the House: Khag Raj Bhatta, NCP since 14 August 2026
- Leader of Opposition: Kamal Bahadur Shah, NC since 14 August 2026

Structure
- Political groups: Government (33): NCP: 22; CPN (UML): 11; Opposition (19): Congress: 18; RPP: 1; Vacant (1): Vacant: 1
- Length of term: 5 years

Elections
- Voting system: Parallel voting: 32 seats – FPtP; 21 seats – PR
- First election: 2017
- Last election: 20 November 2022
- Next election: 2027

Meeting place
- District Coordination Committee Hall, Dhangadhi, Kailali District

Website
- pga.p7.gov.np

Constitution
- Constitution of Nepal

The Provincial Assembly of Sudurpashchim Pradesh also known as the Sudurpashchim Pradesh Sabha, (Nepali: सुदूरपश्चिम प्रदेश सभा) is a unicameral governing and law making body of Sudurpashchim Province, one of the seven Provinces in Nepal. The assembly is seated a Dhangadhi in Kailali District at the District Coordination Committee Hall. The assembly has 53 members of whom 32 are elected through first-past-the-post voting and 21 are elected through proportional representation. The term of the assembly is 5 years unless dissolved earlier.

The First Provincial Assembly was constituted in 2017, after the 2017 provincial elections. The election resulted in a majority for the alliance of CPN (Unified Marxist–Leninist) and CPN (Maoist Centre). The current assembly was elected in November 2022.

== History ==
The Provincial Assembly of Sudurpashchim Province is under Article 175 of the Constitution of Nepal 2015 which guarantees a provincial legislative for each province in the country. The first provincial elections were conducted for all seven provinces in Nepal and the elections in Sudurpashchim was conducted for 53 seats to the assembly. The election resulted in a victory for the CPN (Unified Marxist–Leninist) and CPN (Maoist Centre) alliance which later went on to form a coalition government under Trilochan Bhatta from Maoist Centre. The first meeting of the provincial assembly was held on 4 February 2018. Arjun Bahadur Thapa from CPN (UML) was elected as the first speaker of the provincial assembly, and Nirmala Badal Joshi from Maoist Centre as the first deputy speaker of the provincial assembly. In November 2025 Maoist Centre and CPN (Unified Socialist) unified to form Nepali Communist Party and in December Nagrik Unmukti Party merged with it.

== List of assemblies ==
Election Year	Assembly	Start of term	End of term	Speaker	Chief Minister	Party
2017	1st Assembly	4 February 2018	2022	Arjun Bahadur Thapa	Trilochan Bhatta (Cabinet)	CPN (Maoist Centre)
2022	2nd Assembly	2 January 2023	Incumbent	Bhim Bahadur Bhandari	Rajendra Singh Rawal (Cabinet)(Until 9 February 2023)	CPN (Unified Marxist-Leninist)
2022	2nd Assembly	2 January 2023	Incumbent	Bhim Bahadur Bhandari	Kamal Bahadur Shah (10 February 2023 – 4 April 2024), (5 August 2024 – present )	Nepali Congress
2022	2nd Assembly	2 January 2023	Incumbent	Bhim Bahadur Bhandari	Dirgha Bahadur Sodari (Cabinet)( 18 April 2024 – 5 August 2024)	CPN (Unified Socialist)

== Committees ==
Article 195 of the Constitution of Nepal provides provincial assemblies the power to form special committees in order to manage working procedures.

S.No.	Committee	Members
1	Finance, Development and Natural Resources	11
2	Legislative and Parliamentary Affairs	11
3	Social Development	11
4	Public Accounts	11

== Political parties ==
Party	Parliamentary party leader	Seats
Nepali Congress	Kamal Bahadur Shah	18
Nepali Communist Party	Man Bahadur Dhami	22
CPN (UML)	Rajendra Singh Rawal	11
Rastriya Prajatantra Party		1
Vacant		1
Total		53

== See also ==
- Sudurpashchim Province
- Provincial assemblies of Nepal
