= Kanchanpur 3 =

Parliamentary constituency in Nepal

- Parliamentary constituency for the House of Representatives
- Kanchanpur 3 in Sudurpashchim Province; Protected areas in green

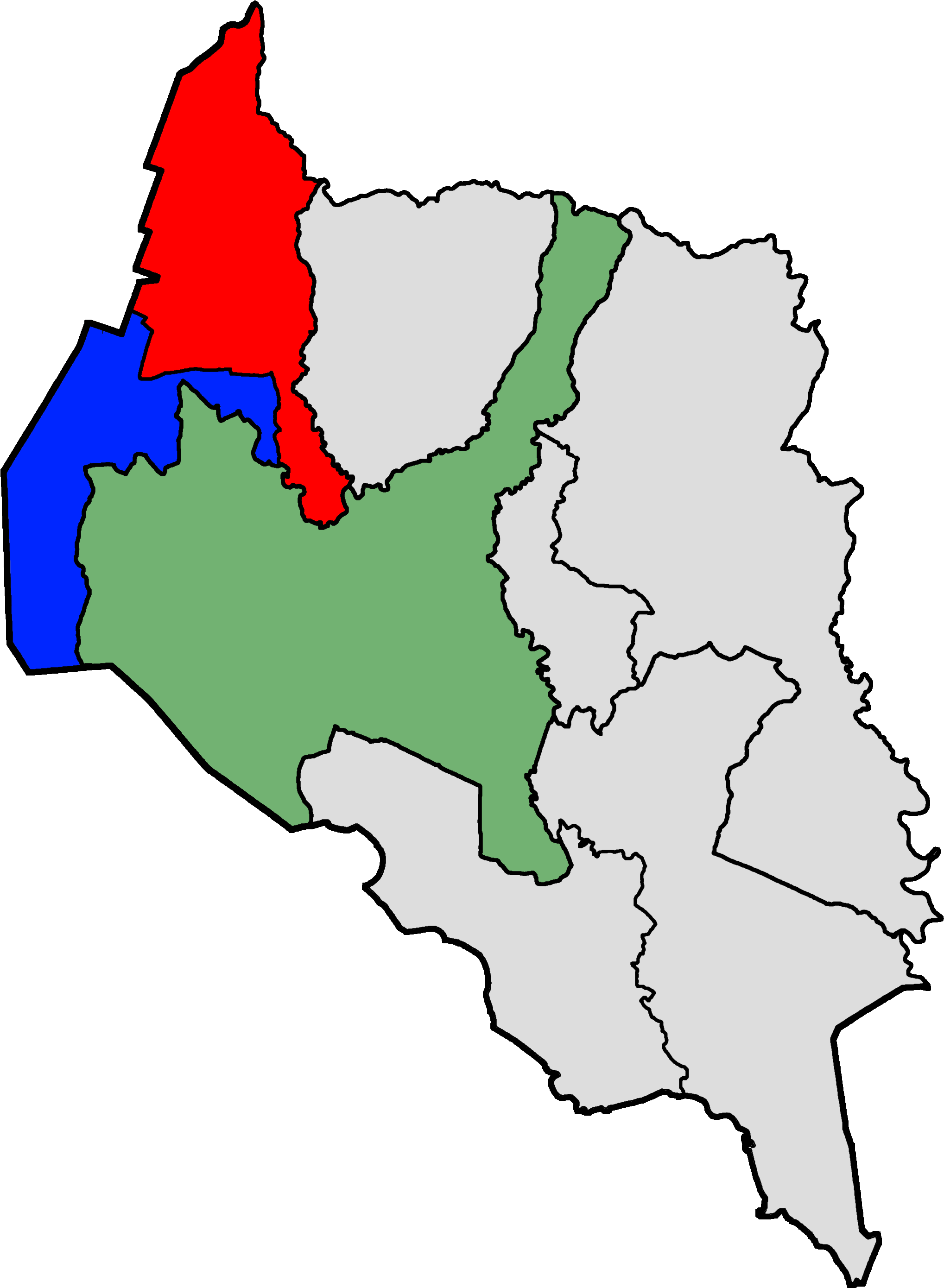
- Assembly segments Kanchanpur 3(A) (red) and Kanchanpur 3(B) (blue) within Kanchanpur District; Protected areas in green
- Province: Sudurpashchim Province
- District: Kanchanpur District
- Electorate: 87,122

Current constituency
- Created: 1994
- MP: Gyanendra Singh Mahata (RSP)
- Sudurpashchim MPA 3(A): Prakash Rawal (NCP)
- Sudurpashchim MPA 3(B): Man Bahadur Sunar (NCP)

Kanchanpur 3 is one of three parliamentary constituencies of Kanchanpur District in Nepal. This constituency came into existence on the Constituency Delimitation Commission (CDC) report submitted on 31 August 2017.

== Incorporated areas ==
Kanchanpur 3 incorporates Mahakali Municipality, Bhimdatta Municipality, and wards 8 of Bedkot Municipality.

== Assembly segments ==
It encompasses the following Sudurpashchim Provincial Assembly segment

- Kanchanpur 3(A)
- Kanchanpur 3(B)

== Members of Parliament ==
=== Parliament/Constituent Assembly ===
Election	Member	Party
1994	Urwa Dutta Pant	CPN (Unified Marxist–Leninist)
1999	Ramesh Lekhak	Nepali Congress
2008	Tekendra Prasad Bhatta	CPN (Maoist)
January 2009	Tekendra Prasad Bhatta	UCPN (Maoist)
2013	Bahadur Singh Thapa	Nepali Congress
2017	Dipak Prakash Bhatta	CPN (Unified Marxist–Leninist)
May 2018	Dipak Prakash Bhatta	Nepal Communist Party
March 2021	Dipak Prakash Bhatta	CPN (Unified Marxist–Leninist)
2022	Ramesh Lekhak	Nepali Congress
2026 Nepalese general election	Gyanendra Singh Mahata	Rastriya Swatantra Party

=== Provincial Assembly ===
==== 3(A) ====
Election	Member	Party
2017	Prakash Rawal	CPN (Unified Marxist-Leninist)
May 2018	Prakash Rawal	Nepal Communist Party
March 2021	Prakash Rawal	CPN (Unified Marxist–Leninist)
August 2021	Prakash Rawal	CPN (Unified Socialist)

==== 3(B) ====
Election	Member	Party
2017	Man Bahadur Sunar	CPN (Maoist Centre)
May 2018	Man Bahadur Sunar	Nepal Communist Party

== Election results ==
=== Election in the 2020s ===
==== 2022 general election ====
Candidate	Party	Votes	%
Ramesh Lekhak	Nepali Congress	30,575	56.46
Niru Devi Pal	CPN (UML)	18,485	34.13
Krishna Luhar	Rastriya Swatantra Party	2,031	3.75
Deepak Bahadur Singh	Independent	1,145	2.11
Others		1,921	3.55
Total		54,157	100.00
Majority		12,090	
Nepali Congress gain			

=== Election in the 2010s ===
==== 2017 legislative elections ====
Party	Candidate	Votes
CPN (Unified Marxist–Leninist)	Dipak Prakash Bhatta	26,364
Nepali Congress	Ramesh Lekhak	26,106
Others		1,059
Invalid votes		3,167
Result	CPN (UML) gain	
Source: Election Commission

==== 2017 Nepalese provincial elections ====
===== 3(A) =====
Party	Candidate	Votes
CPN (Unified Marxist-Leninist)	Prakash Rawal	12,817
Nepali Congress	Yagya Raj Joshi	12,754
Others		565
Invalid votes		1,224
Result	CPN (UML) gain	
Source: Election Commission

===== 3(B) =====
Party	Candidate	Votes
CPN (Maoist Centre)	Man Bahadur Sunar	13,700
Nepali Congress	Bel Bahadur Rana Magar	13,539
Others		759
Invalid votes		1,306
Result	Maoist Centre gain	
Source: Election Commission

==== 2013 Constituent Assembly election ====
Party	Candidate	Votes
Nepali Congress	Bahadur Singh Thapa	12,836
CPN (Unified Marxist–Leninist)	Nar Bahadur Dhami	9,643
UCPN (Maoist)	Tekendra Prasad Bhatta	6,300
Tharuhat Terai Party Nepal	Ishwari Devi Chaudhary	1,935
Others		3,310
Result	Congress gain	
Source: NepalNews

=== Election in the 2000s ===
==== 2008 Constituent Assembly election ====
Party	Candidate	Votes
CPN (Maoist)	Tekendra Prasad Bhatta	15,076
Nepali Congress	Bahadur Singh Thapa	9,273
CPN (Unified Marxist–Leninist)	Govinda Prasad Kalauni	5,667
Rastriya Prajatantra Party	Tirtha Raj Chataul	1,659
Rastriya Janashakti Party	Dhirendra Bahadur Dogaura	1,549
Others		2,919
Invalid votes		2,093
Result	Maoist gain	
Source: Election Commission

=== Election in the 1990s ===
==== 1999 legislative elections ====
Party	Candidate	Votes
Nepali Congress	Ramesh Lekhak	13,527
Rastriya Prajatantra Party (Chand)	Indra Bahadur Khatri	8,336
CPN (Unified Marxist–Leninist)	Urba Dutta Pant	7,503
CPN (Marxist–Leninist)	Lila Dhoj Basnet	2,781
Rastriya Prajatantra Party	Padam Thakurathi	2,498
Others		1,417
Invalid votes		1,463
Result	Congress gain	
Source: Election Commission

==== 1994 legislative elections ====
Party	Candidate	Votes
CPN (Unified Marxist–Leninist)	Urwa Dutta Pant	11,100
Nepali Congress	Narayan Prasad Saud	6,453
Independent	Man Bahadur Sunar	5,769
Rastriya Prajatantra Party	Dharma Raj Joshi	4,427
Independent	Pratap Ram Lohar	213
Result	CPN (UML) gain	
Source: Election Commission

== See also ==
- List of parliamentary constituencies of Nepal
