= Kanchanpur 2 =

Parliamentary constituency in Nepal

- Parliamentary constituency for the House of Representatives
- Kanchanpur 2 in Sudurpashchim Province; Protected areas in green

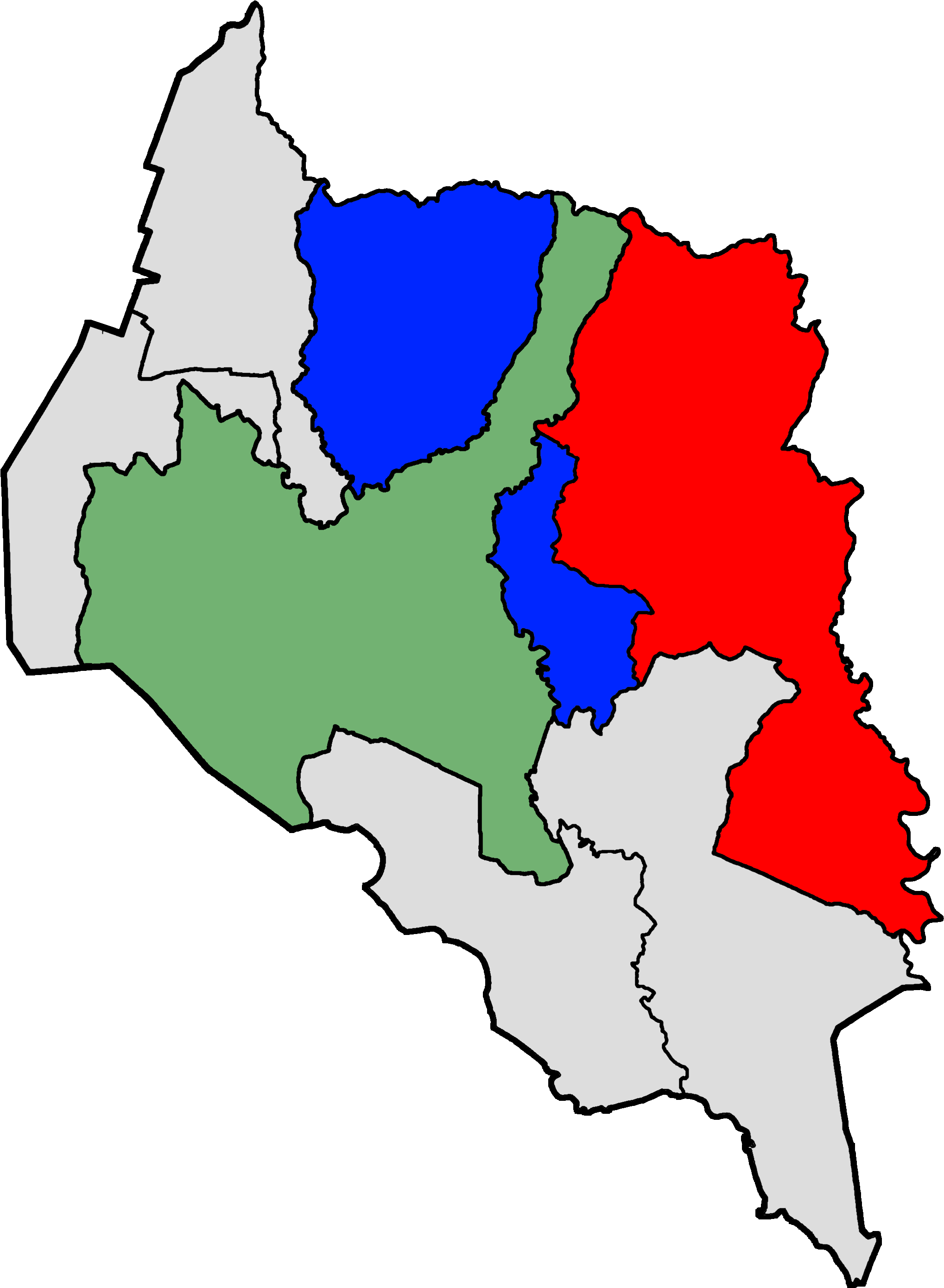
- Assembly segments Kanchanpur 2(A) (red) and Kanchanpur 2(B) (blue) within Kanchanpur District; Protected areas in green
- Province: Sudurpashchim Province
- District: Kanchanpur District
- Electorate: 89,791

Current constituency
- Created: 1991
- Party: Rastriya Swatantra Party
- MP: Deepak Raj Bohara
- Sudurpashchim MPA 2(A): Mohan Dutta Joshi (NCP)
- Sudurpashchim MPA 2(B): Lal Bahadur Khadka (NCP)

Kanchanpur 2 is one of three parliamentary constituencies of Kanchanpur District in Nepal. This constituency came into existence on the Constituency Delimitation Commission (CDC) report submitted on 31 August 2017.

== Incorporated areas ==
Kanchanpur 2 incorporates Krishnapur Municipality, Shuklaphanta Municipality and wards 1–7, 9 and 10 of Bedkot Municipality.

== Assembly segments ==
It encompasses the following Sudurpashchim Provincial Assembly segment

- Kanchanpur 2(A)
- Kanchanpur 2(B)

== Members of Parliament ==
=== Parliament/Constituent Assembly ===
Election	Member	Party
1991	Tarini Dutt Chataut	Nepali Congress
1994	Bhoj Raj Joshi	CPN (Unified Marxist–Leninist)
1999	Tarini Dutt Chataut	Nepali Congress
2008	Devi Lal Chaudhary	CPN (Maoist)
January 2009	Devi Lal Chaudhary	UCPN (Maoist)
2013	Narayan Prakash Saud	Nepali Congress
2017	Nar Bahadur Dhami	CPN (Unified Marxist–Leninist)
May 2018	Nar Bahadur Dhami	Nepal Communist Party
March 2021	Nar Bahadur Dhami	CPN (Unified Marxist–Leninist)
2022	Narayan Prakash Saud	Nepali Congress
2026	Deepak Raj Bohara	Rastriya Swatantra Party

=== Provincial Assembly ===
==== 2(A) ====
Election	Member	Party
2017	Mohan Dutta Joshi	CPN (Maoist Centre)
May 2018	Mohan Dutta Joshi	Nepal Communist Party

==== 2(B) ====
Election	Member	Party
2017	Lal Bahadur Khadka	CPN (Unified Marxist-Leninist)
May 2018	Lal Bahadur Khadka	Nepal Communist Party
March 2021	Lal Bahadur Khadka	CPN (Unified Marxist–Leninist)
August 2021	Lal Bahadur Khadka	CPN (Unified Socialist)

== Election results ==
=== Election in the 2020s ===
==== 2022 general election ====
Candidate	Party	Votes	%
Narayan Prakash Saud	Nepali Congress	28,136	46.96
Nar Bahadur Dhami	CPN (UML)	21,682	36.19
Jhankar Raj Joshi	Rastriya Swatantra Party	4,937	8.24
Ashok Bahadur Singh	Rastriya Prajatantra Party	3,515	5.87
Others		1,646	2.75
Total		59,916	100.00
Majority		6,454	
Nepali Congress gain			

=== Election in the 2010s ===
==== 2017 legislative elections ====
Party	Candidate	Votes
CPN (Unified Marxist–Leninist)	Nar Bahadur Dhami	33,220
Nepali Congress	Narayan Prakash Saud	24,893
Others		1,411
Invalid votes		3,257
Result	CPN (UML) gain	
Source: Election Commission

==== 2017 Nepalese provincial elections ====
===== 2(A) =====
Party	Candidate	Votes
CPN (Maoist Centre)	Mohan Dutta Joshi	17,672
Nepali Congress	Pushkar Raj Ojha	12,462
Others		668
Invalid votes		1,232
Result	Maoist Centre gain	
Source: Election Commission

===== 2(B) =====
Party	Candidate	Votes
CPN (Unified Marxist-Leninist)	Lal Bahadur Khadka	16,385
Nepali Congress	Bahadur Singh Thapa	11,851
Others		1,078
Invalid votes		1,403
Result	CPN (UML) gain	
Source: Election Commission

==== 2013 Constituent Assembly election ====
Party	Candidate	Votes
Nepali Congress	Narayan Prakash Saud	13,415
CPN (Unified Marxist–Leninist)	Tara Lama Tamang	9,676
UCPN (Maoist)	Amin Prasad Dahit	8,293
Madeshi Janadhikar Forum, Nepal (Loktantrik)	Amar Singh Rana	4,783
Terai Madhesh Sadbhawana Party Nepal	Ram Autar Rana	1,331
Rastriya Prajatantra Party	Bhuwan Raj Bhatta	1,328
Others		3,321
Result	Congress gain	
Source: NepalNews

=== Election in the 2000s ===
==== 2008 Constituent Assembly election ====
Party	Candidate	Votes
CPN (Maoist)	Devi Lal Chaudhary	18,284
Nepali Congress	Narayan Prakash Saud	11,202
Rastriya Prajatantra Party	Ram Autar Rana	5,623
CPN (Unified Marxist–Leninist)	Maya Ram Chaudhary	4,643
CPN (United)	Ram Bahadur Bista	1,873
Others		2,934
Invalid votes		2,942
Result	Maoist gain	
Source: Election Commission

=== Election in the 1990s ===
==== 1999 legislative elections ====
Party	Candidate	Votes
Nepali Congress	Tarini Dutt Chataut	13,109
CPN (Unified Marxist–Leninist)	Chandra Lal Chaudhary	10,282
Rastriya Prajatantra Party	Binod Bista	6,047
CPN (Marxist–Leninist)	Bhoj Raj Joshi	3,817
Rastriya Prajatantra Party (Chand)	Nanda Devi Khatri	2,139
Others		1,417
Invalid votes		1,236
Result	Congress gain	
Source: Election Commission

==== 1994 legislative elections ====
Party	Candidate	Votes
CPN (Unified Marxist–Leninist)	Bhoj Raj Joshi	11,863
Nepali Congress	Tarani Dutt Chataut	7,203
Rastriya Prajatantra Party	Binod Bista	5,260
Independent	Prem Bahadur Bista	2,035
Others		498
Result	CPN (UML) gain	
Source: Election Commission

==== 1991 legislative elections ====
Party	Candidate	Votes
Nepali Congress	Tarini Dutt Chataut	16,923
CPN (Unified Marxist–Leninist)		9,802
Result	Congress gain	

== See also ==
- List of parliamentary constituencies of Nepal
