= Kanchanpur 1 =

Parliamentary constituency in Nepal

- Parliamentary constituency for the House of Representatives
- Kanchanpur 1 in Sudurpashchim Province; Protected areas in green

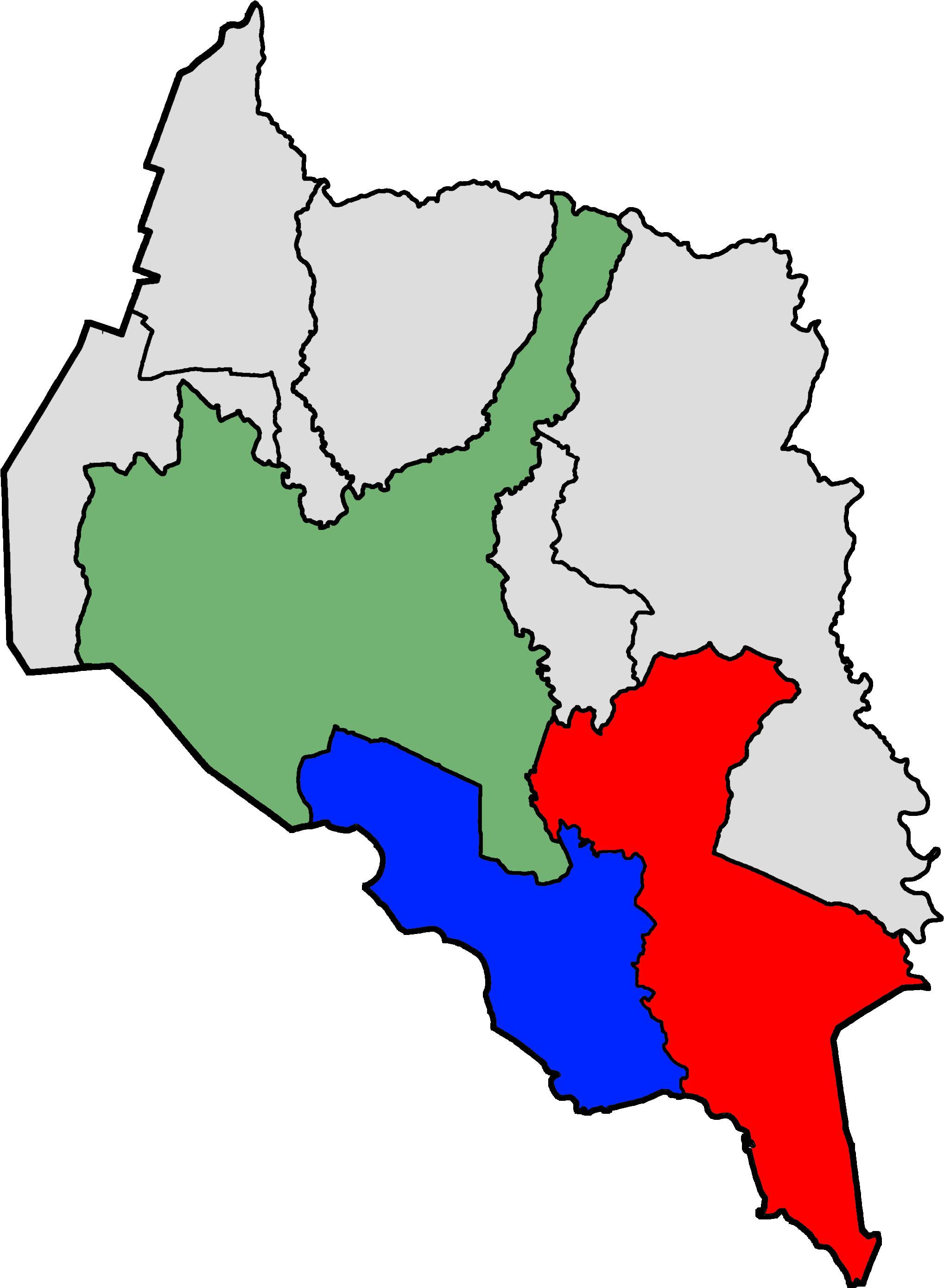
- Assembly segments Kanchanpur 1(A) (red) and Kanchanpur 1(B) (blue) within Kanchanpur District; Protected areas in green
- Province: Sudurpashchim Province
- District: Kanchanpur District
- Electorate: 88,059

Current constituency
- Created: 1991
- MP: Janak Singh Dhami (Rastriya Swatantra Party)
- Sudurpashchim MPA 1(A): Tara Lama Tamang (NCP)
- Sudurpashchim MPA 1(B): Kulbir Chaudhary (NCP)

Kanchanpur 1 is one of three parliamentary constituencies of Kanchanpur District in Nepal. This constituency came into existence on the Constituency Delimitation Commission (CDC) report submitted on 31 August 2017.

== Incorporated areas ==
Kanchanpur 1 incorporates Beldani Rural Municipality, Belauri Municipality, Punarbas Municipality and Laljhadi Rural Municipality.

== Assembly segments ==
It encompasses the following Sudurpashchim Provincial Assembly segment

- Kanchanpur 1(A)
- Kanchanpur 1(B)

== Members of Parliament ==
=== Parliament/Constituent Assembly ===
Election	Member	Party
1991	Basu Dev Bhatta	Nepali Congress
1994	Ram Kumar Gyawali	CPN (Unified Marxist–Leninist)
1999	Narayan Prakash Saud	Nepali Congress
2008	Puran Rana Tharu	CPN (Maoist)
January 2009	Puran Rana Tharu	UCPN (Maoist)
2013	Diwan SIngh Bista	Nepali Congress
2017	Bina Magar	CPN (Maoist Centre)
May 2018	Bina Magar	Nepal Communist Party
March 2021	Bina Magar	CPN (Maoist Centre)
2022	Tara Lama Tamang	CPN (Unified Marxist–Leninist)
2026	Janak Singh Dhami	Rastriya Swatantra Party

=== Provincial Assembly ===
==== 1(A) ====
Election	Member	Party
2017	Tara Lama Tamang	CPN (Unified Marxist-Leninist)
May 2018	Tara Lama Tamang	Nepal Communist Party
March 2021	Tara Lama Tamang	CPN (Unified Marxist–Leninist)
August 2021	Tara Lama Tamang	CPN (Unified Socialist)

==== 1(B) ====
Election	Member	Party
2017	Kulbir Chaudhary	CPN (Unified Marxist-Leninist)
May 2018	Kulbir Chaudhary	Nepal Communist Party
March 2021	Kulbir Chaudhary	CPN (Unified Marxist–Leninist)
August 2021	Kulbir Chaudhary	

== Election results ==
=== Election in the 2020s ===
==== 2022 general election ====
Candidate	Party	Votes	%
Tara Lama Tamang	CPN (UML)	24,943	41.47
Bina Magar	CPN (Maoist Centre)	19,400	32.26
Nanda Kumar Rana	Nagrik Unmukti Party	8,685	14.44
Dilli Bahadur Shahi	Rastriya Prajatantra Party	3,539	5.88
Dev Raj Joshi	Rastriya Swatantra Party	1,909	3.17
Others		1,664	2.77
Total		60,140	100.00
Majority		5,543	
CPN (UML) gain			

=== Election in the 2010s ===
==== 2017 legislative elections ====
Party	Candidate	Votes
CPN (Maoist Centre)	Bina Magar	38,467
Nepali Congress	Diwan Singh Bista	19,219
Others		2,577
Invalid votes		3,032
Result	Maoist Centre gain	
Source: Election Commission

==== 2017 Nepalese provincial elections ====
===== 1(A) =====
Party	Candidate	Votes
CPN (Unified Marxist-Leninist)	Tara Lama Tamang	20,015
Nepali Congress	Gopal Singh Gurung	9,290
Others		949
Invalid votes		1,140
Result	CPN (UML) gain	
Source: Election Commission

===== 1(B) =====
Party	Candidate	Votes
CPN (Unified Marxist-Leninist)	Kulbir Chaudhary	16,158
Nepali Congress	Ram Lal Rana	10,223
Independent	Rajendra Prasad Joshi	1,640
Others		2,387
Invalid votes		1,462
Result	CPN (UML) gain	
Source: Election Commission

==== 2013 Constituent Assembly election ====
Party	Candidate	Votes
Nepali Congress	Diwan SIngh Bista	10,294
CPN (Unified Marxist–Leninist)	Lal Bahdur Bishwakarma	9,236
UCPN (Maoist)	Bina Magar	9,151
Madeshi Janadhikar Forum, Nepal (Loktantrik)	Puskal Chaudhary	1,399
Rastriya Janamorcha	Raj Bahadur Chaudhary	1,342
Rastriya Prajatantra Party	Nanda Lal Chataut	1,153
Others		3,473
Result	Congress gain	
Source: NepalNews

=== Election in the 2000s ===
==== 2008 Constituent Assembly election ====
Party	Candidate	Votes
CPN (Maoist)	Puran Rana Tharu	14,765
Nepali Congress	Amar Singh Rana	11,781
CPN (Unified Marxist–Leninist)	Ram Kumar Gyawali	7,834
Rastriya Janamorcha	Lokendra Prasad Lamsal	3,758
Rastriya Prajatantra Party	Nanda Lal Chataut	1,429
Others		1,982
Invalid votes		1,592
Result	Maoist gain	
Source: Election Commission

=== Election in the 1990s ===
==== 1999 legislative elections ====
Party	Candidate	Votes
Nepali Congress	Narayan Prakash Saud	13,101
CPN (Unified Marxist–Leninist)	Ram Kumar Gyawali	9,219
Rastriya Prajatantra Party	Ram Autar Rana	6,397
Rastriya Janamorcha	Mewa Ram Chaudhary	5,178
CPN (Marxist–Leninist)	Babu Ram Adhikari	2,378
Rastriya Prajatantra Party (Chand)	Labru Rana Tharu	1,457
Nepal Dalit Sharmeek Morcha	Khadak Bahadur B.K.	1,334
Others		331
Invalid votes		1,561
Result	Congress gain	
Source: Election Commission

==== 1994 legislative elections ====
Party	Candidate	Votes
CPN (Unified Marxist–Leninist)	Ram Kumar Gyawali	11,425
Nepali Congress	Amar Singh Tharu	9,254
Rastriya Prajatantra Party	Nanda Lal Chataut	5,140
Independent	Ganesh Bahadur Thapa	1,402
Others		463
Result	CPN (UML) gain	
Source: Election Commission

==== 1991 legislative elections ====
Party	Candidate	Votes
Nepali Congress	Basu Dev Bhatta	15,367
CPN (Unified Marxist–Leninist)		10,301
Result	Congress gain	

== See also ==
- List of parliamentary constituencies of Nepal
