= Sangita Dhami =

Nepalese woman wrestling player

Personal information
- Full name: Sangita Dhami
- Nationality: Nepalese
- Born: Sangita Bhimdatta Municipality, Kanchanpur, Nepal
- Weight: 55 kg (121 lb)

Sport
- Country: Nepal
- Sport: Wrestling
- Coached by: Rajendra Chand
Medal record
For Nepal
Gold medal – first place	South Asian Games	2019

Sangita Dhami (Nepali: संगीता धामी) is a female wrestler from Nepal. She won a gold medal in 2019 South Asian Games for Nepal.

== Sport Life ==
Dhami is coached by Rajendra Chand, who recruits female wrestlers from schools in Kanchanpur.

== Major Medals ==
She won a gold medal in the 2019 South Asian Games, held in Janakpur. Dhami defeated Bangladeshi wrestler Sakhira Sarakarine for her win. She won Nepal's first ever SAG gold medal in wrestling. Dhami was 19 at the time of her win.
