= Bina Magar =

Nepalese politician

- विना मगर

Water Supply Minister of Nepal
- In office 16 March 2018 – 20 December 2020
- President: Bidhya Devi Bhandari
- Prime Minister: Khadga Prasad Oli
- Preceded by: Mahendra Yadav
- Succeeded by: Mani Thapa

Member of Parliament, Pratinidhi Sabha
- In office 4 March 2018 – 18 September 2022
- Preceded by: Diwan Singh Bista
- Succeeded by: Tara Lama Tamang
- Constituency: Kanchanpur 1

Personal details
- Born: 8 December 1983 (age 42) I.B.R.D Way, Punarbas, Kanchanpur District, Nepal
- Party: Nepali Communist Party
- Other political affiliations: CPN (Maoist Centre) (until 2018; 2021–2025); Nepal Communist Party (2018–2021)
- Spouses: Shankar Adhikari (div. 2012) Prakash Dahal (m. 2012; died 2017)
- Relations: Pushpa Kamal Dahal (father-in-law); Renu Dahal (sister-in-law)
- Parents: Chandra Bahadur Rajan Magar (father); Sabitri Maya Magar (mother)

Bina Magar (Nepali: विना मगर), is a Nepalese politician. She was the water supply minister of Nepal from 16 March 2018 to 20 December 2020. She is a leader of Nepal Communist Party. Magar is the daughter-in-law of former Prime Minister Pushpa Kamal Dahal and third wife of his only son Prakash Dahal, who died of a sudden cardiac arrest in November 2017. She was defeated with Janak Singh Dhami from Rastriya Swatantra Party in 2026 general election.

== See also ==
- List of Nepalese politicians
