= Ramesh Lekhak =

Nepali politician

- रमेश लेखक

Minister of Home Affairs
- In office 15 July 2024 – 8 September 2025
- President: Ram Chandra Poudel
- Prime Minister: KP Sharma Oli
- Preceded by: Rabi Lamichhane
- Succeeded by: Om Prakash Aryal

Minister of Physical Infrastructure and Transport of Nepal
- In office 4 August 2016 – 31 May 2017
- President: Bidhya Devi Bhandari
- Prime Minister: Puspha Kamal Dahal
- Preceded by: Bijay Kumar Gachhadar
- Succeeded by: Bir Bahadur Balayar

Minister of State for Labour and Transport Management of Nepal
- In office 22 May 2006 – 18 August 2008
- Prime Minister: Girija Prasad Koirala
- Preceded by: Ram Narayan Singh as Minister
- Succeeded by: Lekh Raj Bhatta as Minister
Parliamentary offices
Member of Parliament, Pratinidhi Sabha
In office 22 December 2022 – 12 September 2025
Preceded by	Dipak Prakash Bhatta
Succeeded by	Gyanendra Singh Mahata
Constituency	Kanchanpur 3
In office May 1999 – May 2002
Preceded by	Urba Dutt Pant
Succeeded by	Tekendra Prasad Bhatt
Constituency	Kanchanpur 3
Member of 2nd Nepalese Constituent Assembly
In office 21 January 2014 – 14 October 2017
Preceded by	Harish Thakulla
Succeeded by	Constituency abolished
Constituency	Kanchanpur 4
Member of 1st Nepalese Constituent Assembly for Nepali Congress party list
In office 28 May 2008 – 28 May 2012

Personal details
- Born: 11 December 1963 (age 62) Kathmandu District, Nepal
- Party: Nepali Congress

Ramesh Lekhak (Nepali: रमेश लेखक) is a Nepali politician who served as Minister of Home Affairs from 2024 to 2025. Lekhak, a member of the Nepali Congress party was elected to the Pratinidhi Sabha in the 1999 election, 2008 election and 2013 election. Now Ex-Home Minister Lekhak is accused of ordering to open fire with live ammunition against a peaceful protest held by students and other people on September 8.

He has previously served as appointed Minister of Physical Infrastructure & Transport of Nepal. In the 2022 Nepalese general election, he was elected as a member of the 2nd Federal Parliament of Nepal from Kanchanpur 3 (constituency).

Lekhak resigned from the Home Minister's post on 8 September 2025, taking moral responsibility for the violence in which 23 protesters were killed and over 300 injured after police and security forces opened fire in protests against a corruption and social media ban.
