= Nigali (disambiguation) =

Nigali may refer to:

- Nigali Band, a Village in Kanchanpur Nepal
- Nigali, a settlement in Nepal
- Nigali valley, on the border of Turkey and Georgia
