= Gulariya Bazar =

City in Nepal

Gulariya is a growing city in Krishnapur Municipality of Kanchanpur district in Nepal.

== Introduction ==
Gulariya Bazar is a centre point of Krishnapur Municipality. Mahendra highway passes through Gulariya at Krishnapur. Krishnapur municipality office is situated in Gulariya. In Gulariya there is a Kanchan multiple campus, Krishna higher secondary school basically famous for ISC, CTEVT ISC AG programme and other TSLC programmes which are currently running boarding school in Gulariya are kanchanjunga secondary school, Shree Saraswati Vidya Niketan and another at Bani is Shree Sunlight Public School (S.P.S bani) which were famous in the locality.

== See also ==
- Bhimdatta
- Attariya Municipality
- Dhangadhi
