= Beldandi =

Beldandi बेलडाँडी
- Rural municipality
- Location in Nepal
- Coordinates: 28.84°N 80.15°E
- Country: Nepal
- Province: Sudurpashchim Province
- District: Kanchanpur District

Population (2011)
  - Total: 21 959
- Time zone: UTC+5:45 (NST)

Beldandi (Nepali: बेलडाँडी) is a rural municipality in Kanchanpur District in Sudurpashchim Province of southwestern Nepal named after the former Village Development Committee. At the time of the 1991 Nepal census the VDC had a population of 9301 people living in 1483 individual households. According to the Nepal census 2011 the municipality had 3022 individual households and a population of 21,959. In the north and west, Beldandi is surrounded by Suklaphatha national park. To the east lies Belauri Municipality. On the south, it borders India.

The main attractions in Beldandi are the local Tharu dance Gaura Festival and some night parties. In the education, there is a college named Rauleshwar Adarsh Janata Multiple Campus and Rauleshwar Higher Secondary School. The main shopping places are Chawanni Bazaar and Beldandi bazaar, small towns that supply daily goods and services.

== Demographics ==
At the time of the 2011 Nepal census, Beldandi Rural Municipality had a population of 21,949. Of these, 27.5% spoke Doteli, 24.4% Tharu, 19.8% Bajhangi, 16.2% Nepali, 4.2% Baitadeli, 4.0% Magar, 2.2% Bajureli, 0.7% Achhami, 0.4% Darchuleli, 0.3% Maithili, 0.1% Bengali, 0.1% Bhojpuri and 0.1% other languages as their first language.

In terms of ethnicity/caste, 34.1% were Chhetri, 24.5% Tharu, 13.1% Hill Brahmin, 8.4% other Dalit, 5.4% Thakuri, 4.4% Magar, 4.2% Kami, 2.2% Sanyasi/Dasnami, 1.7% Damai/Dholi, 0.5% Sarki, 0.5% Thami, 0.2% Badi, 0.2% Hajjam/Thakur, 0.1% Bengali, 0.1% Gurung, 0.1% Lohar, 0.1% Rai and 0.3% others.

In terms of religion, 95.9% were Hindu, 1.8% Prakriti, 1.3% Christian, 0.8% Baháʼí and 0.1% others.

In terms of literacy, 66.8% could read and write, 1.1% could only read and 32.1% could neither read nor write.

== Educational institutions ==
Educational institutes in the local area include:

=== Government schools ===
- Rauleshwar Janata Adarsh Multiple Campus
- Ganesh Secondary School
- Rauleshwar Secondary School
- Shree Siddhanath Secondary School
- Shree Saraswati Janata Secondary School
- Shree Baijanath Secondary School
- Shree Tribhuwan Secondary School
- Shree Kalika Primary School
- Shree Singhapal Primary School

=== Private schools ===
- Shree Model Child Care Boarding School
- Shree Navajyoti Public School
- Shree Kanchan Galaxy Public School
- Shree Westpoint Public School
- Shree Little Star Boarding School
- Shree Long Vision Public School
- Shree Jivan Rekha Public School
- Gurukul Academy, Beldnadi Bazar
- Shree Sagarmatha Public School
- Shree Oxford Public School
- Shree Global School

== Economy ==
The local economy mainly based on agriculture and few with business and service. Rice, wheat, corn and other crops are grown in there. Local farmers lack the modern knowledge of farming so they can not get good harvests.

Business Areas:

1. Chawanni Bazaar
2. Beldandi Bazaar

== Health centers ==
Beldandi primary health care centers

Ward clinics are available in each wards

Various private clinics in Beldandi bazaar and Chawanni

== Local culture and religion ==
Most of the local people believe in Hinduism so their customs mainly influenced by the Hindu rituals. The local culture mainly depends upon the ethnic groups living in the place. In spite of residence of different ethnic group this area has quite mixed cultures and traditions. The local Tharu people usually have their own traditions while others are migrated from the hilly region of the country.

== Transportation ==
The transportation in Beldandi is mainly bus service that runs daily from Mahendranagar to Sreepur. The local transportation is two-wheelers. Auto-rickshaws that run from Daijee to Kalikich (Camp) are quite common.
