= Dekhatbhuli =

Dekhatbhuli देखतभुली
- Village development committee
- Location in Nepal
- Coordinates: 28.82°N 80.41°E
- Country: Nepal
- Province: Sudurpashchim Province
- District: Kanchanpur District

Population (1991)
  - Total: 8,304
- Time zone: UTC+5:45 (Nepal Time)

Dekhatbhuli is a village development committee in Kanchanpur District in Sudurpashchim Province of south-western Nepal. At the time of the 1991 Nepal census it had a population of 8304 people living in 1080 individual households. Kalagaudi is one of the villages of this village development committee.
