= Geeta Kumari Chaudhary =

Nepalese female politician

- गीता कुमारी चौधरी

Member of the Sudurpashchim Provincial Assembly
- Incumbent
- Assumed office 30 December 2022

Personal details
- Born: 29 October 1989 (age 36) Krishnapur, Kanchanpur District, Nepal
- Party: Nepali Congress
- Spouse: Dr. Phool Ram Choudhary
- Profession: Politician; Teacher

Geeta Kumari Chaudhary (Nepali: गीता कुमारी चौधरी) is a Nepalese politician and former teacher currently serving as a member of the 2nd Sudurpashchim Provincial Assembly since 30 December 2022. In the 2022 Nepalese provincial election, she was elected as a proportional representative from the Tharu people category. Chaudhary is also a parliamentary party whip of the Nepali Congress in the Provincial Assembly.
