= Dambari Mahara =

Nepalese female politician

- डम्मरी महरा

Member of the Sudurpashchim Provincial Assembly
- Incumbent
- Assumed office 30 December 2022

Personal details
- Born: 28 September 1984 (age 42) Krishnapur, Kanchanpur District, Nepal
- Party: Nepali Congress
- Parents: Khadga Bahadur Mahara (father); Lali Devi Mahara (mother)
- Profession: Politician

Dambari Mahara (Nepali: डम्मरी महरा) is a Nepalese politician and currently serving as a member of the 2nd Sudurpashchim Provincial Assembly since 30 December 2022. In the 2022 Nepalese provincial election she was elected as a proportional representative from the Khas people category.
