= Narayan Prakash Saud =

Nepali politician

The Honourable Narayan Prakash Saud
- नारायण प्रकाश साउद
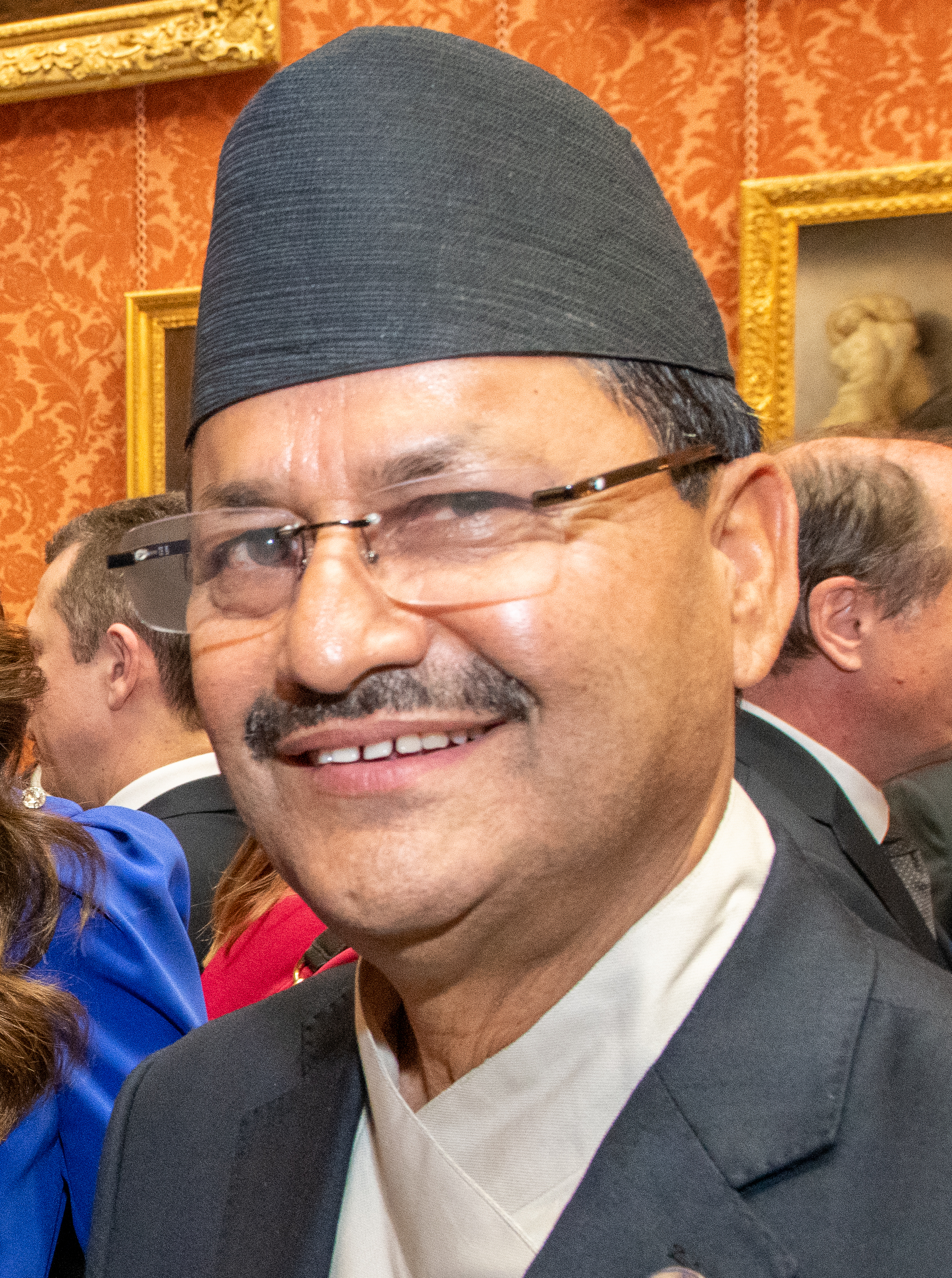
- Narayan Prakash Saud in 2023

Minister of Foreign Affairs
- In office 16 April 2023 – 4 March 2024
- President: Ram Chandra Paudel
- Prime Minister: Pushpa Kamal Dahal
- Preceded by: Bimala Rai Paudyal
- Succeeded by: Narayan Kaji Shrestha

Minister of Irrigation
- In office 25 February 2014 – 11 October 2015
- President: Ram Baran Yadav
- Prime Minister: Sushil Koirala
- Preceded by: Umakant Jha
- Succeeded by: Umesh Kumar Yadav

Member of Parliament, Pratinidhi Sabha
- In office 22 December 2022 – 12 September 2025
- Preceded by: Nar Bahadur Dhami
- Succeeded by: Deepak Raj Bohara
- Constituency: Kanchanpur 2
- In office May 1999 – May 2002
- Preceded by: Ram Kumar Gyawali
- Succeeded by: Puran Rana Tharu (as member of Constituent Assembly)
- Constituency: Kanchanpur 1

Member of the Constituent Assembly / Legislature Parliament
- In office 21 January 2014 – 14 October 2017
- Preceded by: Devi Lal Chaudhary
- Succeeded by: Nar Bahadur Dhami (as member of Pratinidhi Sabha)
- Constituency: Kanchanpur 2

Personal details
- Born: 9 August 1962 (age 63) Dadeldhura, Nepal
- Party: Nepali Congress
- Spouse: Jyotshna Saud

Narayan Prakash Saud (Nepali: नारायण प्रकाश साउद, commonly known as NP Saud) is a Nepali politician who served as Minister of Foreign Affairs from April 2023 to March 2024. A central member of Nepali Congress, Saud previously served as the Minister of Irrigation from 25 February 2014 to 11 October 2015 in Sushil Koirala's cabinet. He is a member of the Pratinidhi Sabha from Kanchanpur 2, having won the seat in the 2022 general election.

First elelcted to the Pratinidhi Sabha from Kanchanpur 1 in the 1999 general election, Saud served as the Minister of State for Education and Sports from 1999 to 2001. He opted to switch seat to Kanchapur 2 in the 2008 Constituent Assembly election, but was defeated by CPN (Maoist)'s Devi Lal Chaudhary. He was elected from Kanchanpur 2 in the 2013 CA election, but was again defeated in the 2017 general election. Saud won the seat back in 2022, defeating the sitting member, Nar Bahadur Dhami of CPN (UML).
