= Chawanni, Nepal =

Coordinates: 28°47′N 80°15′E

Chawanni चवन्नी
- Village
- Interactive map of Chawanni
- Country: Nepal
- Province: Sudurpashchim Province
- District: Kanchanpur District
- Time zone: UTC+5:45 (Nepal Time)

Chawanni is a small town located in the Beldandi municipality that supplies the most goods for the local people. These goods are mainly traded from nearby Indian towns and Bhimdatta (formerly called Mahendranagar).
