= Bansaha =

Bansaha Village Bansaha बंशाह
- Village
- Location in Nepal
- Coordinates (Bansaha): 28°51′0.85″N 80°21′52.4″E
- Country: Nepal
- Regions: Far-Western
- Province: Sudurpashchim Province
- District: Kanchanpur District

Population (2011)
  - Total: 8,000
- 2011 Nepal census
- Time zone: UTC+5:45 (Nepal Time)
- Area code: +977-99

Bansaha is a small village in Jhalari-Pipaladi Municipality of Kanchanpur District, Sudurpashchim Province, Far Western Nepal. This village has a population of around 8000 people, and has one health post and two higher secondary schools. Bansaha is geographically in the lap of nature surrounded with forest and a river . There are two lakes as well as four temples. Basically the residents here are Tharu people (both Rana tharus and Chaudharys) and people who migrated from hills of Bajhang, Baitadi and Dadeldhura (Called Pahadis).There have been a large number of migrations in the past three years. There is one primary school and one lower secondary school in Bansaha. Kalagaudi is one of the village southern from Bansaha.

The land of Bansaha is considered to be fertile and most of the people depend upon farming. The main crops grown here are Rice, Wheat, Mustard and few Pulses like Vigna mungo and Pink Lentils as well as Peas.
