= Rampur Bilaspur =

Rampur Bilaspur रामपुर विलासपुर
- Location in Nepal
- Coordinates: 28.73°N 80.31°E
- Country: Nepal
- Province: Sudurpashchim Province
- District: Kanchanpur District

Population (1991)
  - Total: 11,841
- Time zone: UTC+5:45 (Nepal Time)

Rampur Bilaspur is a town in Kanchanpur District in Sudurpashchim Province of south-western Nepal. The former village development committee was converted into Municipality merging with existing Rampur Bilaspur, Laxmipur, Mahakali and Sreepur, Mahakali village development committee on 18 May 2014. At the time of the 1991 Nepal census it had a population of 11,841 people living in 1650 individual households.
