= Laxmipur, Kanchanpur =

Coordinates: 28°39′N 80°22′E

Laksmipur लक्ष्मीपुर
- Interactive map of Laksmipur
- Country: Nepal
- Province: Sudurpashchim Province
- District: Kanchanpur District

Population (1991)
  - Total: 11,767
- Time zone: UTC+5:45 (Nepal Time)

Laksmipur is a village development committee in Kanchanpur District in Sudurpashchim Province of south-western Nepal. The former village development committee was converted into Municipality merging with existing Rampur Bilaspur, Laksmipur, Mahakali and Sripur village development committee on 18 May 2014. At the time of the 1991 Nepal census it had a population of 11,767.
