= Chandra Lal Chaudhary =

Nepalese politician

Personal details
- Party: CPN (UML)

Chandra Lal Chaudhary is a Nepalese politician, belonging to the Communist Party of Nepal (Unified Marxist-Leninist). He contested the 1999 legislative election in the Kanchanpur-2 constituency, coming second with 10282 votes.
