= Gyanendra Singh Mahata =

Nepalese politician and journalist

The Honourable Gyanendra Singh Mahata
- ज्ञानेन्द्र सिंह महता

Member of Parliament, Pratinidhi Sabha
- Incumbent
- Assumed office 26 March 2026
- Preceded by: Ramesh Lekhak
- Constituency: Kanchanpur 3

Personal details
- Citizenship: Nepalese
- Party: Rastriya Swatantra Party
- Education: Nepal Open University (MCom)
- Profession: Politician; Journalist

Gyanendra Singh Mahata (Nepali: ज्ञानेन्द्र सिंह महता) is a Nepalese politician and journalist serving as a member of parliament from the Rastriya Swatantra Party. He is the member of the 7th Pratinidhi Sabha elected from Kanchanpur 3 constituency in 2026 Nepalese general election securing 27,118 votes and defeating his closest contender Hari Prasad Bohara of the Nepali Congress. He is also in charge of the Sudurpaschim Province for the Rastriya Swatantra Party. Since 2011 he has run two FM Radio Stations of Kanchanpur District called Radio Rastriya and Radio Janboli as a managing director.

Mahata was a former Province Coordinator of the Broadcasting Association of Nepal (BAN) of Sudurpashchim Province from 2017 until 2022. Presently, he is serving as a secretary of the party's central science, communication and information department since March 2026. He holds MCom from Nepal Open University.
