= Nigali Band =

Nigali Band village is located in Krishnapur Municipality of Kanchanpur District. This place is 25 kilometres (16 mi) from Mahindranagar and 3 kilometres (1.9 mi) from Mahendra highway.
