= Kalika, Kanchanpur =

Kalika कालिका
- Location in Nepal
- Coordinates: 28.68°N 80.44°E
- Country: Nepal
- Province: Sudurpashchim Province
- District: Kanchanpur District

Population (1991)
  - Total: 8,233
- Time zone: UTC+5:45 (Nepal Time)

Kalika is a town and market center in Punarbas Municipality in Kanchanpur District in Sudurpashchim Province of south-western Nepal. The former village development committee was merged to form new municipality on 18 May 2014. At the time of the 1991 Nepal census it had a population of 8233 people living in 1406 individual households.
