= Rauteli Bichawa =

Rauteli Bichawa रौतेली बिचवा
- Village development committee
- Location in Nepal
- Coordinates: 28.83°N 80.25°E
- Country: Nepal
- Province: Sudurpashchim Province
- District: Kanchanpur District

Population (1991)
  - Total: 6,718
- Time zone: UTC+5:45 (Nepal Time)

Rauteli Bichawa is a village development committee in Kanchanpur District in Sudurpashchim Province of south-western Nepal. At the time of the 1991 Nepal census it had a population of 6718 people living in 1186 individual households.
