= Daijee =

Village development committee in Sudurpashchim Province, Nepal

Daiji दैजि
- Village development committee
- Location in Nepal
- Coordinates: 29.00°N 80.30°E
- Country: Nepal
- Province: Sudurpashchim Province
- District: Kanchanpur District

Population (2021)
  - Total: 3,190
- Time zone: UTC+5:45 (Nepal Time)
- Website: bedkotmun.gov.np

Daijee (English: Daijee) is a Bedkot Municipality in Kanchanpur District in Sudurpashchim Province of south-western Nepal. At the time of the 1991 Nepal census it had a population of 6597 people living in 2088 individual households.

Bedkot lake is one of the most famous destination and pilligrimage for Hindu religion. Bedkot lake is situated 6 km north of Daijee. One more tourist attraction is Linga, people love to visit for picnic as well as for Shiva Darshan (Hindu's God). Linga is very close to Daijee Chauraha (about 5 km), on the way to Bedkot Lake. Besides this, Daijee is growing as a junction of connecting peoples from Bhitrimadesh (Dadeldhura) and Tarai belt.
