= Baise Bichawa =

Coordinates: 28°41′N 80°28′E

Baise Bichawa बैसे बिचवा
- Village development committee
- Motto: To promote and develop our far-western culture
- Interactive map of Baise Bichawa
- Country: Nepal
- Province: Sudurpashchim Province
- District: Kanchanpur District

Population (2011)
  - Total: 14,301
- Time zone: UTC+5:45 (Nepal Time)
- Area code: 099

Baise Bichawa was a village development committee in Kanchanpur District in Sudurpashchim Province of south-western Nepal. At the time of the 1991 Nepal census it had a population of 7678 people living in 1142 individual households.

It was merged to the rural municipality in 2017.
