= Tara Lama Tamang =

Nepali politician

- तारा लामा तामाङ

Minister for Economic Affairs of Sudurpashchim Province
- In office 17 September 2021 – 8 April 2022
- Governor: Dev Raj Joshi
- Chief Minister: Trilochan Bhatta
- Preceded by: Prakash Bahadur Shah
- Succeeded by: Prakash Rawal

Member of Parliament, Pratinidhi Sabha
- In office 26 December 2022 – 12 September 2025
- Preceded by: Bina Magar
- Succeeded by: Janak Singh Dhami
- Constituency: Kanchanpur 1

Member of the Sudurpashchim Provincial Assembly
- In office 21 January 2018 – 7 October 2022
- Preceded by: Constituency established
- Succeeded by: Bir Bahadur Thapa
- Constituency: Kanchanpur 1 (A)

Personal details
- Born: 10 September 1973 (age 52) Kanchanpur District
- Party: CPN (UML)

Tara Lama Tamang is a Nepalese politician, belonging to the CPN (UML) currently serving as a member of the 2nd Federal Parliament of Nepal. In the 2022 Nepalese general election, he was elected from the Kanchanpur 1 (constituency).
