= Parasan =

Parasan परासन
- Municipality
- Location in Nepal
- Coordinates: 28.61°N 80.49°E
- Country: Nepal
- Province: Sudurpashchim Province
- District: Kanchanpur District

Population (1991)
  - Total: 9,796
- Time zone: UTC+5:45 (Nepal Time)

Parasan (परासन) is a village and later it became Parasan VDC which is now in Punarbas Municipality in Kanchanpur District in Sudurpashchim Province of south-western Nepal. The former village development committee was merged to form a new municipality on 18 May 2014. At the time of the 1991 Nepal census it had a population of 9796 people living in 1615 individual households.

== Economy ==
Parasan has been one of the village development committees which have been subject to the Nepali government's Land Reform Program, which was launched in 1964.
