= Adarsh Vidya Niketan Secondary School =

Adarsh Vidya Niketan
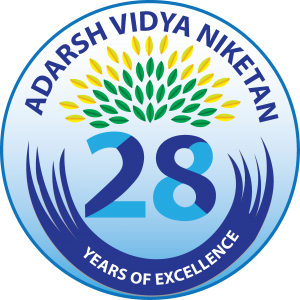

Location
- Bhimduttnagar; Nepal
- Coordinates: 28.9711°N 80.1750°E

Information
- Motto: Education For All
- Established: 1993
- Principal: Bhoj Raj Pant
- Affiliation: National Examination Board "NEB Nepal".
- Website: www.avnss.edu.np

Adarsh Vidya Niketan is a higher secondary school located at Bhimduttnagar, Kanchanpur District, Nepal. Also known as AVN, it is located in Far-western Development Region. It conducts various programs every week, including social awareness programs. Bhoj Raj Pant is the principal of AVN. Seema Joshi is the coordinator.

The school has a campus at Bhimduttnagar known as Adarsh Vidya Niketan. It is a management college.

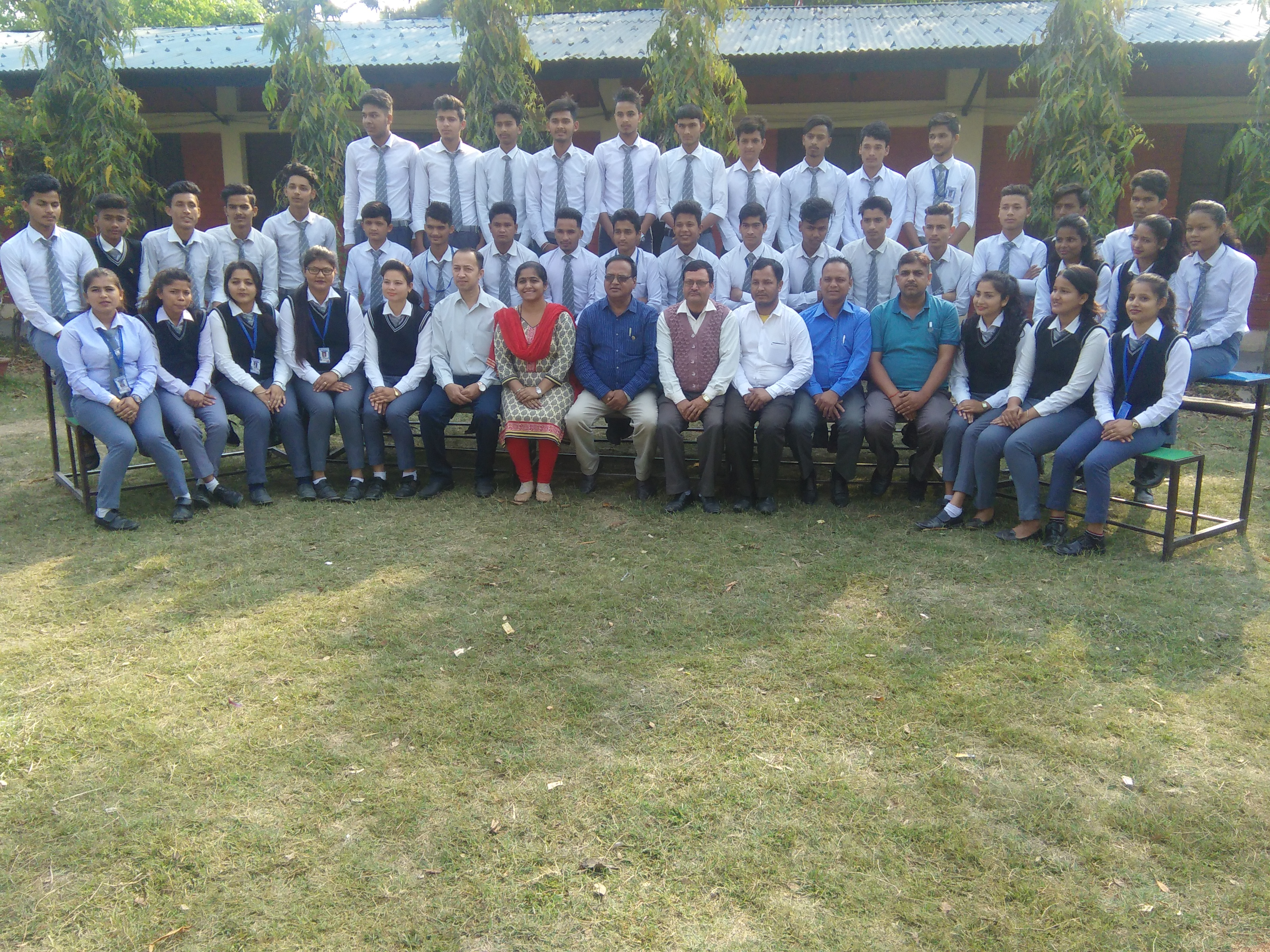
2075 Batch photo

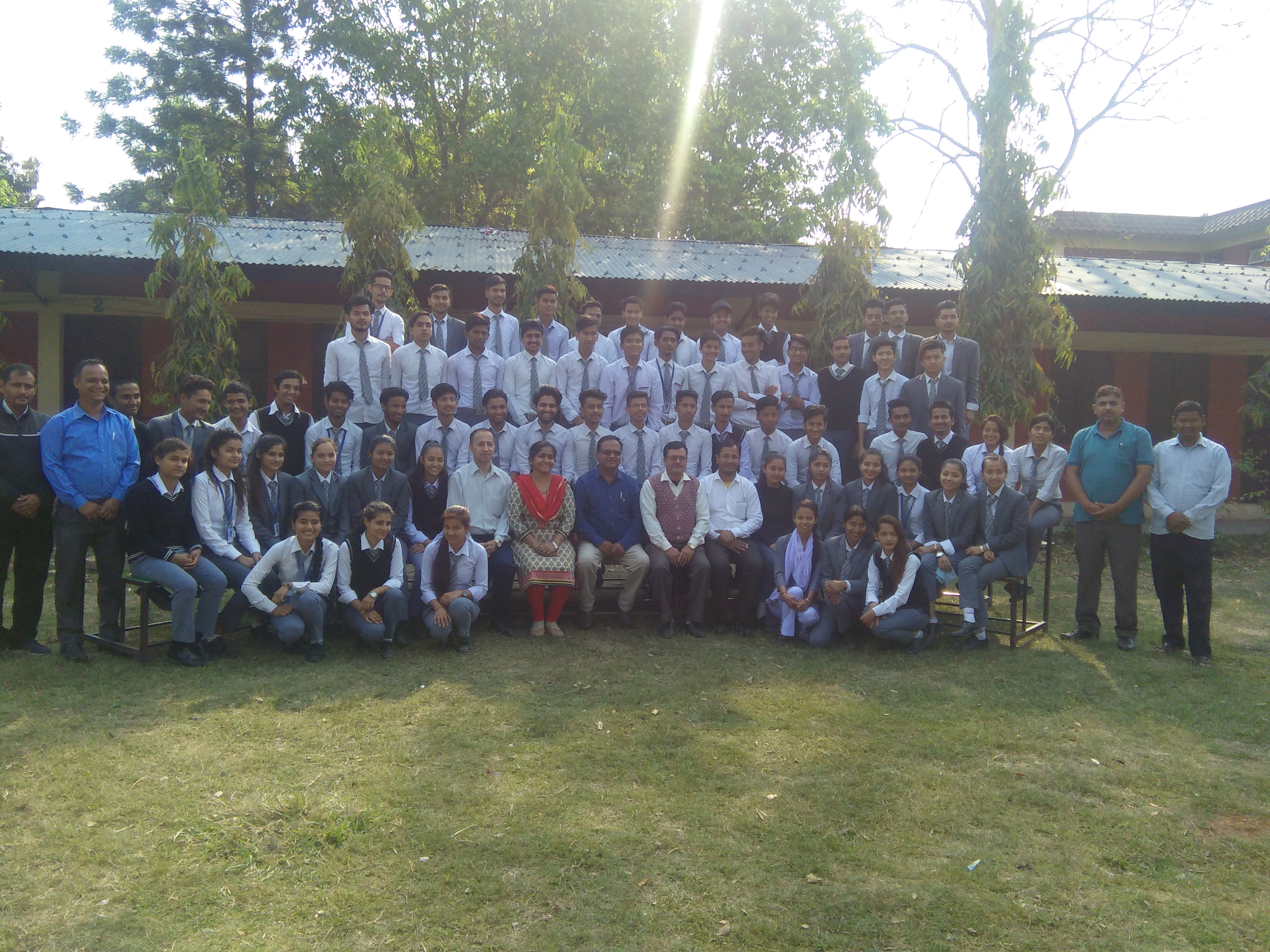
2075 12th Batch
