= Bimala Rai Paudyal =

Nepalese politician

- विमला राई पौड्याल
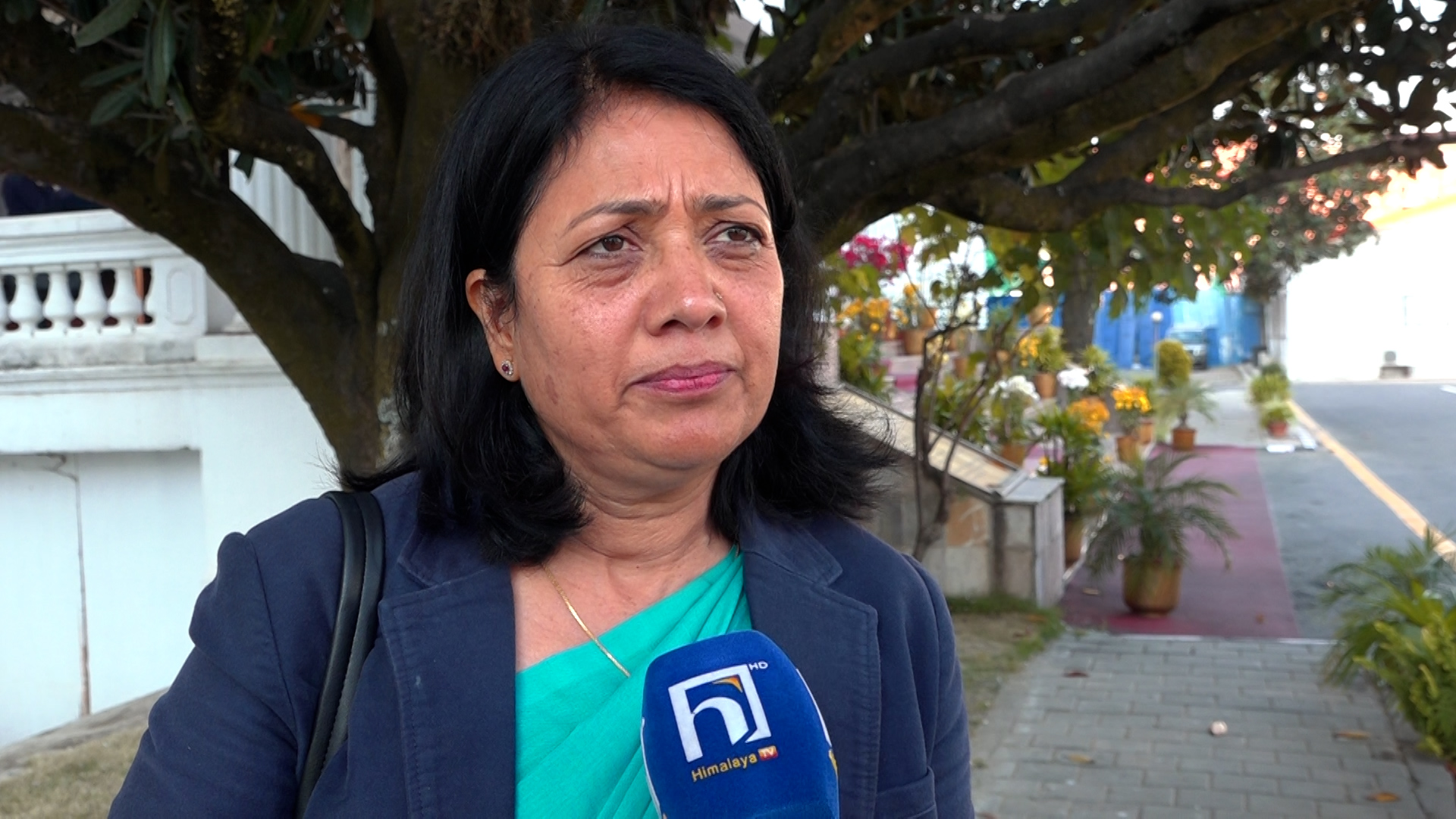

48th Minister of Foreign Affairs
- In office 17 January 2023 – 27 February 2023
- President: Bidya Devi Bhandari
- Prime Minister: Pushpa Kamal Dahal
- Preceded by: Narayan Khadka
- Succeeded by: Narayan Prakash Saud

Nominated Member of Parliament, Rastriya Sabha
- Incumbent
- Assumed office 10 March 2018
- Appointed by: Bidya Devi Bhandari

Personal details
- Born: Morang District, Nepal
- Party: Communist Party of Nepal (Unified Marxist–Leninist)

Bimala Rai Paudyal is a Nepalese politician. She served as the Minister of Foreign Affairs in the Government of Nepal during January- February 2023, becoming the third woman to hold this position. Paudyal also serves as a nominated Member of the National Assembly of the Federal Parliament of Nepal. She is affiliated with the Communist Party of Nepal (Unified Marxist–Leninist).

Paudyal holds a PhD in Development Studies from the International Institute of Social Studies in the Netherlands, an MA in Economics and Management of Rural Development, a Post Graduate Diploma in Development Administration from Manchester University in the UK, and a BSC in Agriculture Economics from Tribhuvan University in Nepal.

She is also an adjunct Professor of Development Studies at the Agriculture and Forestry University in Nepal. Before entering politics, Paudyal worked with government agencies, INGOs, bilateral organizations, and NGOs. She represented Nepal in Climate Parliament and the International Parliamentary Network for Education (IPNEd).
