= Deepak Raj Bohara =

Nepalese Politician

- दीपकराज बोहरा

Member of Parliament, Pratinidhi Sabha
- Elected
- Assumed office 27 March 2026
- Preceded by: Narayan Prakash Saud
- Constituency: Kanchanpur 2

Personal details
- Party: Rastriya Swatantra Party
- Profession: Politician; Journalist

Deepak Raj Bohara (Note: Nepali: दीपकराज बोहरा) is a Nepalese politician serving as a member of parliament from the Rastriya Swatantra Party. He is the member of the 3rd Federal Parliament of Nepal elected from Kanchanpur 2 constituency in 2026 Nepalese general election securing 33,952 votes defeating Narayan Prakash Saud of the Nepali Congress. He is a central committee member and the party secretariat of Rastriya Swatantra Party. He previously worked at Nepal Television, News24, and Galaxy 4k media network.
