= Deepak Prakash Bhatt =

Nepalese politician

- दीपकप्रकाश भट्ट
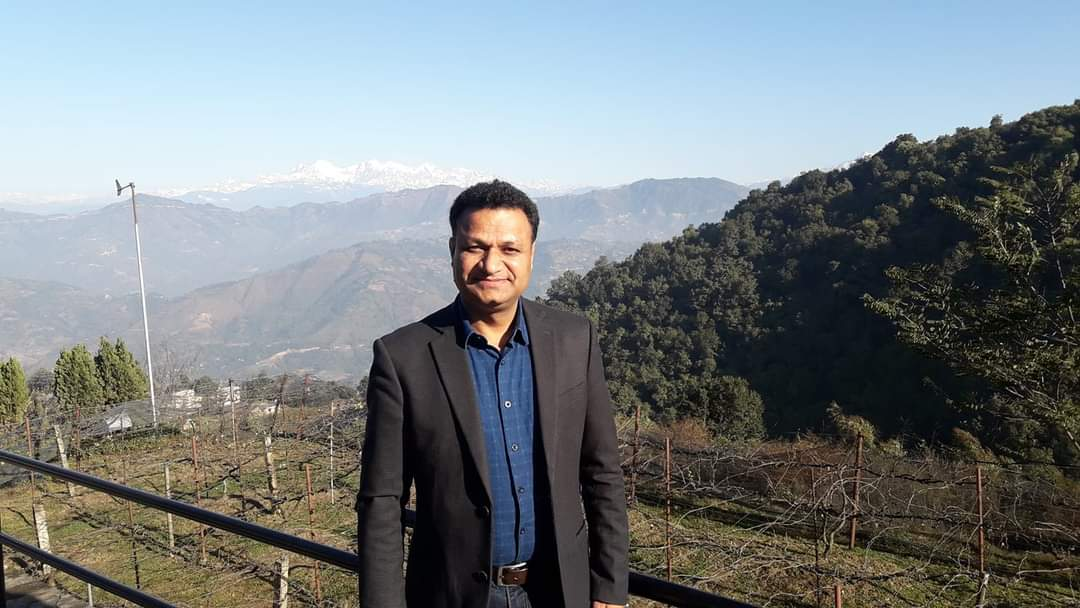

Member of Parliament, Pratinidhi Sabha
- In office 4 March 2018 – 18 September 2022
- Preceded by: Bahadur Singh Thapa
- Constituency: Kanchanpur 3

Personal details
- Born: 11 August 1972 (age 53) Kanchanpur District
- Party: CPN (UML)
- Education: Jawaharlal Nehru University (PhD)

Deepak Prakash Bhatt is a Nepalese politician who is serves as the Member of House of Representatives (Nepal) from Kanchanpur-3, Province No. 7. He is a member of the Nepal Communist Party.
