= Suda, Nepal =

Suda सुडा
- Village development committee
- Location within Nepal Location within Asia
- Country: Nepal
- Province: Sudurpashchim Province
- District: Kanchanpur District

Population (1991)
  - Total: 12,948

Suda is a ward number 7 of Bedkot Municipality in Kanchanpur District in Sudurpashchim Province of south-western Nepal. At the time of the 1991 Nepal census, it had a population of 12,948 people living in 1947 individual households.
