= Shuklaphanta =

Municipality in Sudurpashchim Province, Nepal

Sukhlaphanta Municipality शुक्लाफाटा नगरपालिका
- Municipality
- Nickname: sunapa
- Location in Nepal
- Coordinates (Jhalari-Pipaladi): 28°57′26″N 80°17′17″E
- Country: Nepal
- Regions: Western
- Province: Sudurpashchim Province
- District: Kanchanpur District

Government
  - Mayor: Rana Bahadur Mahara (NC)
  - Deputy Mayor: Kalpana Joshi Panta (NC)

Population (2011)
  - Total: 47,360
- 2011 Nepal census
- Time zone: UTC+5:45 (Nepal Time)
- Area code: +977-099
- Website: http://shuklaphantamun.gov.np

Shuklaphanta is a municipality in Kanchanpur District in Sudurpashchim Province of south-western Nepal. The new municipality was formed by merging two existing villages—Jhalari and Pipaladi—on 18 May 2014. The office of the municipality is that of the former Jhalari village development committee.

== Demographics ==
At the time of the 2011 Nepal census, Shuklaphanta Municipality had a population of 47,360. Of these, 61.7% spoke Doteli, 24.5% Tharu, 4.9% Baitadeli, 3.3% Achhami, 2.4% Nepali, 1.2% Magar, 0.5% Bajhangi, 0.5% Darchuleli, 0.3% Bajureli, 0.2% Hindi, 0.2% Sign language, 0.1% Maithili, 0.1% Surel and 0.2% other languages as their first language.

In terms of ethnicity/caste, 38.7% were Chhetri, 24.6% Tharu, 18.9% Hill Brahmin, 4.6% Kami, 4.0% other Dalit, 2.8% Thakuri, 1.8% Damai/Dholi, 1.3% Magar, 1.3% Sarki, 0.7% Sanyasi/Dasnami, 0.6% Lohar, 0.1% Badi, 0.1% Kathabaniyan, 0.1% Musalman, 0.1% Rajput, 0.1% Tamang, and 0.2% others.

In terms of religion, 98.1% were Hindu, 1.0% Christian, 0.7% Prakriti, 0.1% Buddhist and 0.1% Muslim.

In terms of literacy, 68.5% could read and write, 2.4% could only read and 29.1% could neither read nor write.

== Villages ==
- Bansaha
