= Beldandi Rural Municipality =

Rural Municipality in Sudurpashchim Province, Nepal

Beldandi Rural Municipality बेलडाँडी गाउँपालिका
- Rural Municipality
- बेलडाँडी गाउँपालिका Beldandi Rural Municipality (Nepal)
- Coordinates: 28.773°N 80.264°E
- Country: Nepal
- Province: Sudurpashchim Province
- District: Kanchanpur District

Government
  - Type: Local government
  - Chairperson: Dhan Bahadur Chettri Thapa
  - Administrative Head: Ganesh Datta Bhatta

Area
  - Total: 36.7 km^{2} (14.2 sq mi)

Population (2011 census)
  - Total: 21,949
  - Density: 598/km^{2} (1,550/sq mi)
- Time zone: UTC+05:45 (Nepal Standard Time)
- Website: http://beldandimun.gov.np

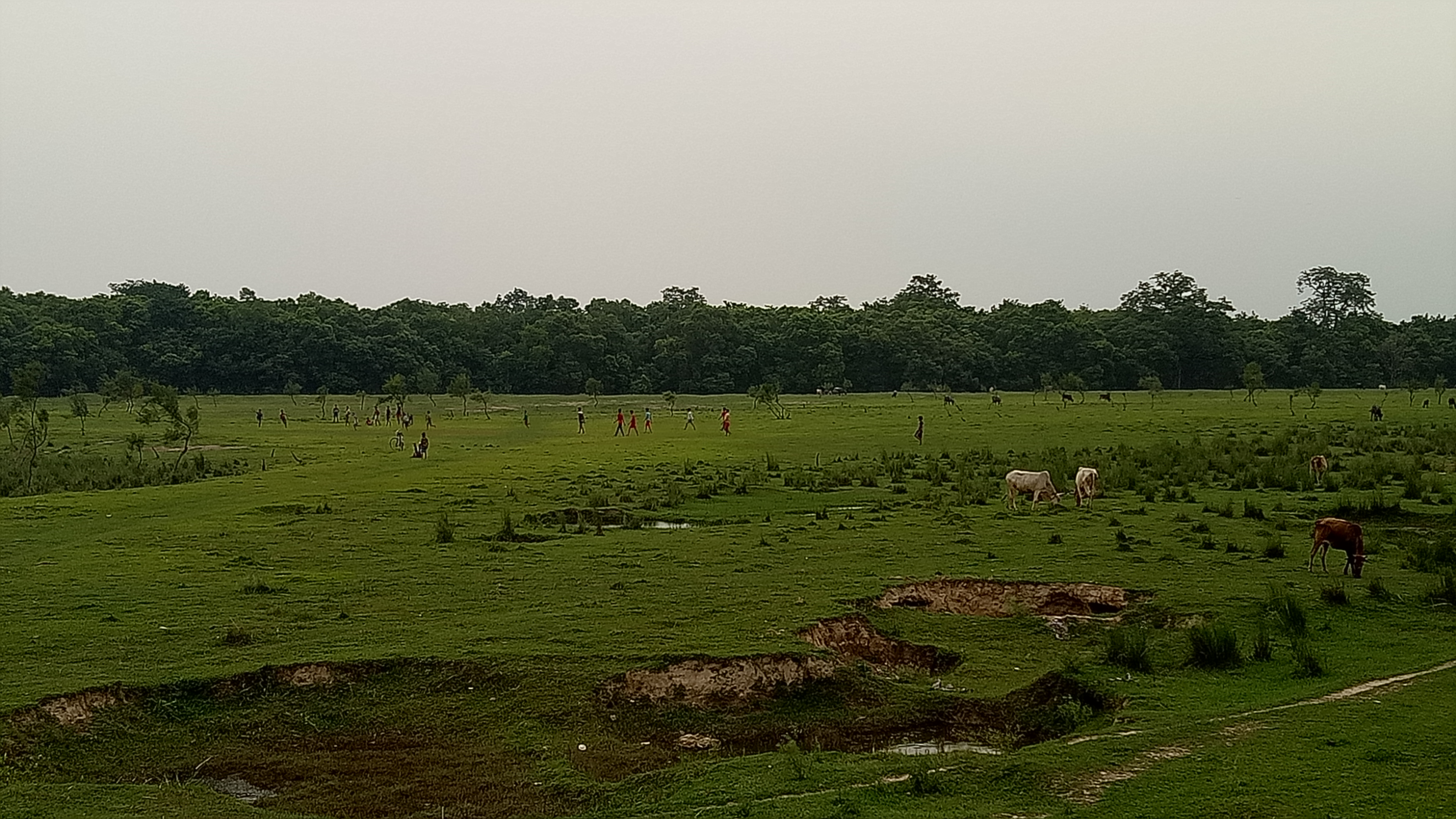

Beldandi (Nepali: बेलडाँडी) is a Gaupalika in Kanchanpur District in the Sudurpashchim Province of far-western Nepal. Beldandi has a population of 21949.The land area is 36.7 km^{2}.
