= Jhalari =

Jhalari झलारी
- Village development committee
- Location in Nepal
- Coordinates: 28.96°N 80.39°E
- Country: Nepal
- Province: Sudurpashchim Province
- District: Kanchanpur District

Population (1991)
  - Total: 10,590
- Time zone: UTC+5:45 (Nepal Time)
- Area code: 099-40XXX

Jhalari झलारी is a Village Development Committee in Kanchanpur District in Sudurpashchim Province of South-Far-Western Nepal. At the time of the 1991 Nepal census it had a population of 10,590 people living in 1702 individual households.

== Wards ==
Shuklaphanta is a municipality in Kanchanpur District in Sudurpashchim Province of south-western Nepal.

Ward No.1: गणेशपुर, गणेशपुर चौधरी टोल, मल्लो चौराहा, तल्लो चौराहा, भोरकुण्डा, लौटाहा, खजुवापट्टी, वन्साह गाँऊ, बैशाखा शिबिर

Ward No. 2: गुल्लरपट्टि, लक्ष्मीपुर, ढकनिया, रानीपुर

Ward No. 3: जोनापुर, पिपलाडी, मौरिफाँटा, बागबजार, आमबगिया

Ward No. 4: असैना, ढाँणा, सिकलपट्टी, आशापूर, अछामिटोल

Ward No. 5: गर्जमुनी, वनसमिति, खल्ला टोल, बैशाखा टोल

Ward No. 6: कमलताल टोल:- वडा नं. ७ को सिमा देखि नहरको पुर्व १० नं. सिमा सम्म, बैजनाथ टोल: वडा नं. ७ को सिमाना देखि नहरको पश्चिम बिच बाटोको पुर्व १० को सिमा सम्म, शिव शक्ति टोल राम बहादुर ऐरको घर देखि बिचको बाटोको पश्चिम र बनसमिति बजार हुदै वडा नं. १० को सिमा सम्म

Ward No. 7: सिमलफाँटा, जुडा, कालापानी, शान्तीपुर, स्टेशनपुर, झण्डाभोज, पिताम्बर

Ward No. 8: फुलेली, पारीफाटा, भमरभोज, बेलडाडी, नौखरी

Ward No. 9: सिसैया क, सिसैया ख, खिरुपाटा टोल, लालपनिया टोल, अछामी टोल, मुक्ति टोल

Ward No. 10: साविकको झलारी गाउ विकास समिति वडा नं ३ र ७ लाई मिलाएर वडा नं १० बनाईएको हो । १० नं. वडाको वडा कार्यालय झलारीमा अवस्थित छ ।

== Administration ==
The administrative office of Shuklaphanta is a municipality is located in the north of Jhalari Bazzar. Main market of Jhalari Bazaar is divided into two sides by Mahendra Rajmarga. The office of Village Development Committee is approximately 900 meter to the north of Mahendra Highway.

== Medicine and amenities ==
This VDC has got one Health Post and One Sub-Health Post.

The Sundevi Temple, Mudka Baba, and many temples of Baba Baijanath are the religious places of Jhalari VDC. As like Shuklaphanta Wildlife Reserve is second main place to visit in Jhalari VDC. The reserve is home to animals like elephant, tigers, rhinos, 12 horned deer and other animals.

== Bibliography ==
- Shuklaphanta Municipality
- Shuklaphanta Municipality
- "General Post Office (गोश्वारा हुलाक कार्यालय)". GPO Nepal.
