= Daiji, Nepal =

Coordinates: 28°57′N 80°17′E

Daijee, Now Daijee VDC and Suda VDC become Bedkot Municipality is a village development committee in Kanchanpur District in Sudurpashchim Province of south-western Nepal. It is one of the tourist places in the Farwestern Region with the Bedkot Lake itself and Linga, a famous pilgrimage site. Plus, Suklaphantha National Park lies in the eastern part of Bedkot.
