= Janak Singh Dhami =

Nepalese politician

The Honourable Janak Singh Dhami
- जनकसिंह धामी

Member of Parliament, Pratinidhi Sabha
- Incumbent
- Assumed office 26 March 2026
- Preceded by: Tara Lama Tamang
- Constituency: Kanchanpur 1

Personal details
- Citizenship: Nepalese
- Party: Rastriya Swatantra Party
- Other political affiliations: Nepali Congress (Till Jan 2026)
- Profession: Politician

Janak Singh Dhami (Nepali: जनकसिंह धामी) is a Nepalese politician serving as a member of parliament from the Rastriya Swatantra Party. He is the member of the 7th Pratinidhi Sabha elected from Kanchanpur 1 constituency in 2026 Nepalese General Election securing 24,332 votes and defeating his closest contender Bina Magar of the Nepali Communist Party. He was involved in the parliamentary journey from the Nepali Congress until January 2026.
