= Nar Bahadur Dhami =

Nepali politician

- नर बहादुर धामी

Member of Parliament, Pratinidhi Sabha
- In office 4 March 2018 – 18 September 2022
- Preceded by: Narayan Prakash Saud
- Constituency: Kanchanpur 2

Personal details
- Born: 4 January 1979 (age 47) Kanchanpur District
- Party: CPN UML

Nar Bahadur Dhami is a Nepali communist politician and a member of the House of Representatives of the federal parliament of Nepal. He was elected from Kanchanpur-2 constituency, representing CPN UML of the left alliance, defeating his nearest rival NP Saud of Nepali Congress by more than 8,000 votes.

He was also the CPN UML candidate for Kanchanpur-3 constituency in the second constituent assembly election, in 2013.
