= Jhilmila Lake =

Lake located in Nepal

- Jhilmila Tal
- Location within Nepal
- Location: Kanchanpur District
- Coordinates: 29.0680169°N 80.1846398°E
- Lake type: Natural lake
- Primary inflows: Natural spring
- Basin countries: Nepal
- Surface area: 4.3 ha (11 acres)
- Max. depth: 9 m (30 ft)
- Surface elevation: 668 metres (2,192 ft)

Jhilmila Lake is a 4.3 ha (11 acres) large natural lake in Bhimdatta Municipality of Kanchanpur District in Nepal. It is located at an elevation of about 668 m (2,192 ft) and has a maximum depth of 9 m (30 ft). Its basin area of 40.2 ha (99 acres) consists of marshes and meadows. It is surrounded by deciduous forest dominated by Sal, pine and rhododendron trees.

There is a temple also. It is also a home for many aquatic animals, especially different fish species.
