= Tekendra Prasad Bhatt =

Nepalese politician

- टेकेन्द्र प्रसाद भट्ट
- Incumbent
- Assumed office 2008
- Constituency: Kanchanpur-3

Personal details
- Party: Communist Party of Nepal (Maoist)

Tekendra Prasad Bhatt (Nepali: टेकेन्द्र प्रसाद भट्ट) is a Nepalese politician, belonging to the Communist Party of Nepal (Maoist). In the 2008 Constituent Assembly election he was elected from the Kanchanpur-3 constituency, winning 15076 votes.
