= Kalagaudi =

Kalagaudi Village कालागौडी Kalagaudi
- Village
- Location of Kalagaudi in Nepal
- Coordinates (Kalagaudi): 28°50′07″N 80°21′36″E
- Country: Nepal
- Regions: Far-Western
- Province: Sudurpashchim Province
- District: Kanchanpur District

Population (2021)
  - Total: roughly 7,000
- 2021 Nepal census
- Time zone: UTC+5:45 (Nepal Time)
- Postal code: 10400
- Area code: +977-99

Kalagaudi is a Nepalese village. Kalagaudi is located in the Kanchanpur District of Sudurpashchim Province of Nepal. As of the 2021 Nepal census, the village had a population of roughly 7,000. This village is facilitated with one health post and one secondary school.
