= Bedkot =

Bedkot Municipality बेदकोट
- Municipality
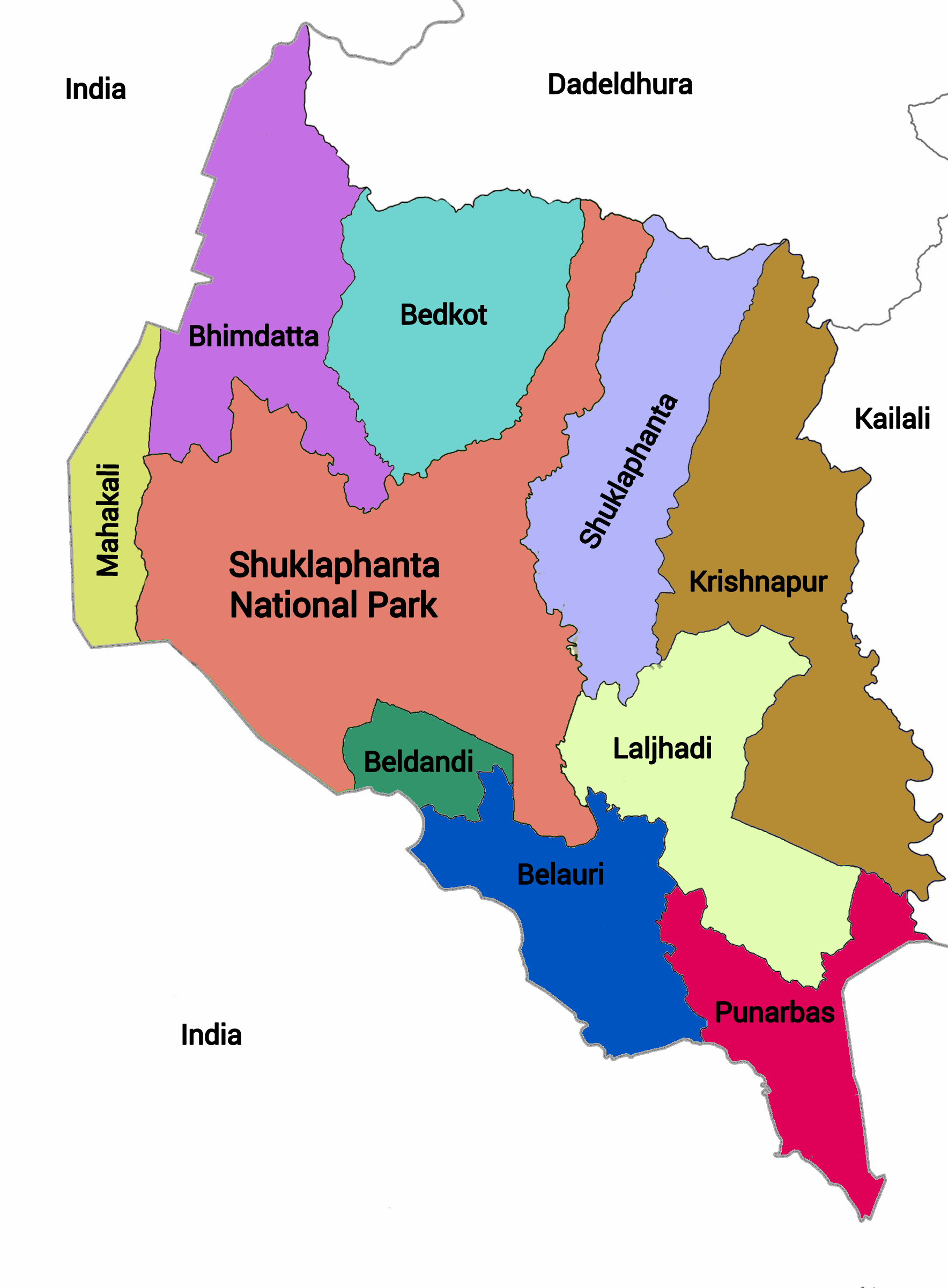
- Bedkot municipality in Kanchanpur district

- Location in Nepal Bedkot Municipality (Nepal)
- Coordinates: 28.95°N 80.23°E
- Country: Nepal
- Province: Sudurpashchim Province
- District: Kanchanpur District

Government
  - Mayor: Bhoj Raj Bohara (NC)
  - Deputy Mayor: Tulasi Joshi(NC)

Population (2011)
  - Total: 49,479
- Time zone: UTC+5:45 (Nepal Time)
- Website: http://bedkotmun.gov.np

Bedkot Municipality is in Kanchanpur District of Kanchanpur. Bedkot Municipality was formed on 18 September 2015 by merging Daiji and Suda VDCs. Bedkot Municipality Office is in Sisaiya Bazar.

It Has 11 numbers of ward at the first time but later on ward no.11 is renamed as ward no.10.

== Demographics ==
At the time of the 2011 Nepal census, Bedkot Municipality had a population of 49,490. Of these, 51.0% spoke Doteli, 18.7% Tharu, 7.7% Baitadeli, 7.2% Bajhangi, 4.5% Achhami, 4.2% Nepali, 4.1% Darchuleli, 1.3% Magar, 0.6% Bajureli, 0.1% Hindi, 0.1% Jumli, 0.1% Maithili, 0.1% Sign language, 0.1% Urdu and 0.1% other languages as their first language.

In terms of ethnicity/caste, 33.0% were Chhetri, 22.0% Hill Brahmin, 19.0% Tharu, 6.1% Kami, 5.6% Thakuri, 3.2% Sarki, 2.9% Damai/Dholi, 2.6% other Dalit, 1.9% Sanyasi/Dasnami, 1.8% Magar, 0.6% Lohar, 0.4% Dhanuk, 0.2% Gurung, 0.2% Musalman, 0.1% Badi and 0.2% others.

in terms of religion, 92.4% were Hindu, 4.9% Prakriti, 1.5% Buddhist, 0.9% Christian, 0.2% Muslim and 0.2% others.

In terms of literacy, 69.9% could read and write, 2.5% could only read and 27.6% could neither read nor write.

== Tourism ==
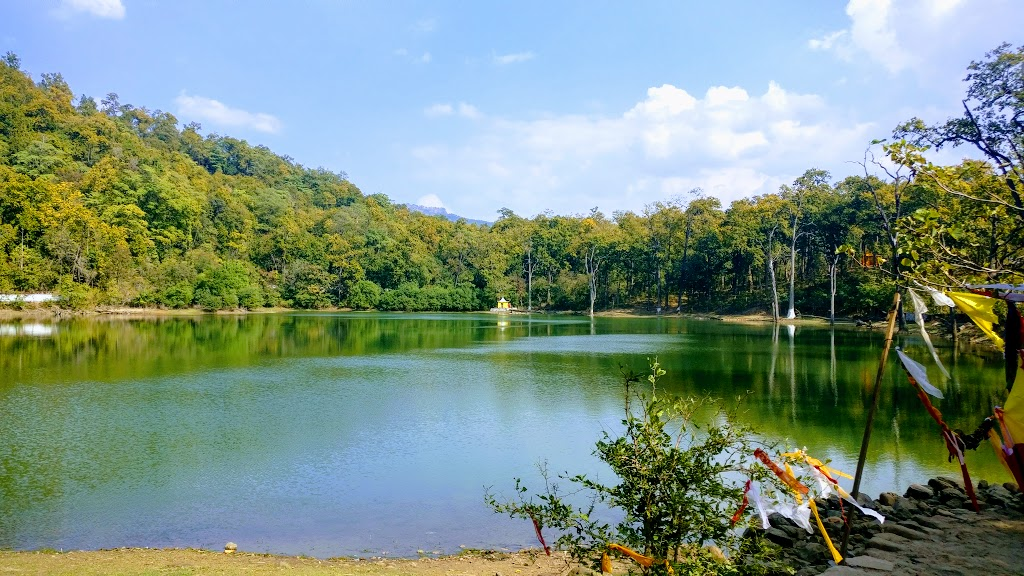
Bedkot lake

1. Bedkot Tal is in the Lap of Green mountain, Daijee, Kanchanpur. It is located at the junction point of Plain (Terai) and Mountainous (Pahad) region of Far West Nepal.

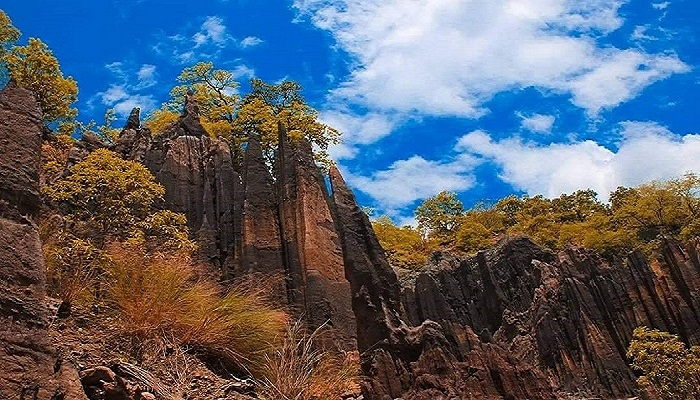
लिंगेस्वर धाम क्षेत्र

2. Linga Dham
