= Devi Lal Chaudhari =

Nepali politician

- देवीलाल चौधरी
- Incumbent
- Assumed office 2008
- Constituency: Kanchanpur-2

Personal details
- Party: Communist Party of Nepal (Maoist)

Devi Lal Chaudhari (Nepali: देवीलाल चौधरी) is a Nepalese politician, belonging to the Communist Party of Nepal (Maoist). In the 2008 Constituent Assembly election he was elected from the Kanchanpur-2 constituency, winning 18,284 votes.
