= Laljhadi Rural Municipality =

Laljhadi Rural Municipality लालझाँडी गाउँपालिका
- Rural Municipality
- लालझाँडी गाउँपालिका Laljhadi Rural Municipality (Nepal)
- Coordinates: 28.764°N 80.427°E
- Country: Nepal
- Province: Sudurpashchim Province
- District: Kanchanpur District

Government
  - Type: Local government
  - Chairperson: Madan Sen Badayak
  - Administrative Head: Sher Bahadur Buda

Area
  - Total: 154.65 km^{2} (59.71 sq mi)

Population (2011 census)
  - Total: 22,569
  - Density: 145.94/km^{2} (377.97/sq mi)
- Time zone: UTC+05:45 (Nepal Standard Time)
- Website: http://laljhadimun.gov.np

Laljhadi (Nepali: लालझाँडी) is a Gaupalika in Kanchanpur District in the Sudurpashchim Province of far-western Nepal. Laljhadi has a population of 22569.The land area is 154.65 km^{2}. It was formed by merging Shankarpur, Baise Bichwa (ward 1–4) and Dekhtabhul (ward 1–3, 5–7,9) VDCs.

== Demographics ==
At the time of the 2011 Nepal census, Laljhadi Rural Municipality had a population of 22,569. Of these, 76.7% spoke Tharu, 12.0% Doteli, 3.4% Magar, 2.7% Baitadeli, 2.0% Nepali, 1.5% Darchuleli, 0.8% Bajhangi, 0.2% Achhami, 0.1% Bajureli, 0.1% Hindi, 0.1% Maithili and 0.2% other languages as their first language.

In terms of ethnicity/caste, 77.0% were Tharu, 9.7% Chhetri, 3.5% Magar, 3.4% Hill Brahmin, 1.5% Sanyasi/Dasnami, 1.3% other Dalit, 1.0% Kami, 0.9% Thakuri, 0.5% Sarki, 0.3% Badi, 0.3% Damai/Dholi, 0.2% other Terai, 0.1% Hajjam/Thakur, 0.1% Limbu, 0.1% Lohar and 0.2% others.

In terms of religion, 92.5% were Hindu, 6.3% Christian, 0.6% Prakriti, 0.4% Baháʼí and 0.1% others.

In terms of literacy, 61.7% could read and write, 2.6% could only read and 35.7% could neither read nor write.
