= Punarbas =

Punarwas पुनर्वास
- Municipality
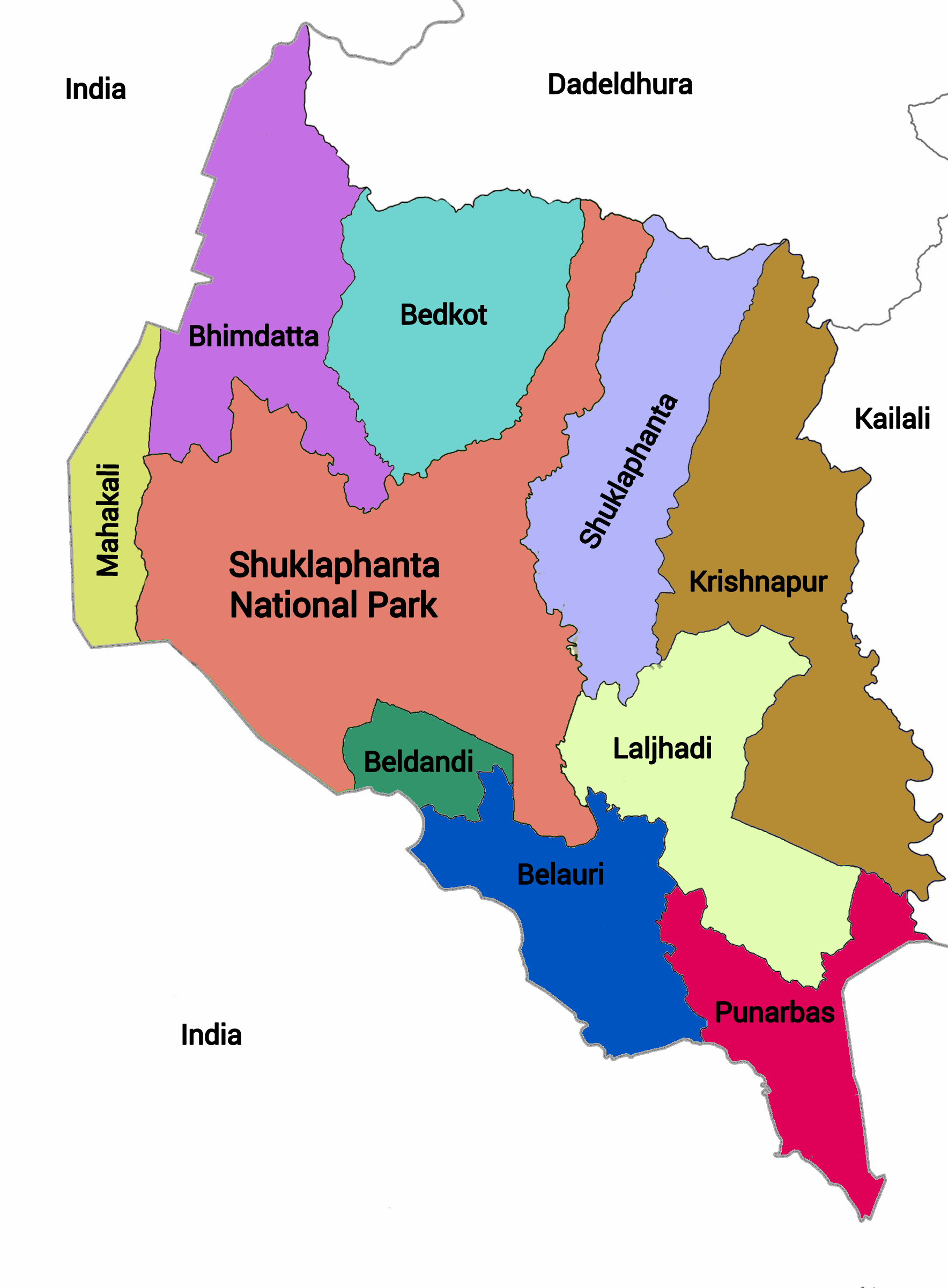
- Punarbas municipality in Kanchanpur district

- Location in Nepal Punarwas (Nepal)
- Coordinates: 28.75°N 80.33°E
- Country: Nepal
- Province: Sudurpashchim
- District: Kanchanpur

Government
  - Mayor: Toya Prashad Sharma (Nepali Congress)
  - Deputy Mayor: Bhuliya Kumari Rana (Nepali Congress)

Population (2011)
  - Total: 43,996
- Time zone: UTC+5:45 (NST)
- Website: www.punarbasmun.gov.np

Punarwas is a Municipality in Kanchanpur District in Sudurpashchim Province of south-western Nepal. The new Municipality was established on 18 May 2014 by merging the existing 3 Village Development Committees i.e. Parasan, Tribhuwanbasti and Kalika. At the time of the 2011 Nepal census, it had a population of 43,996 people living in Punarwas.

== Demographics ==
During the 2011 Nepal census, Punarbas Municipality had a population of 53,672. Of these, 34.0% spoke Nepali, 22.8% Doteli, 19.1% Tharu, 10.9% Tamang, 3.3% Bajureli, 2.1% Bajhangi, 1.8% Magar, 1.7% Achhami, 1.2% Dailekhi, 1.0% Baitadeli, 0.7% Gurung, 0.4% Newar, 0.3% Hindi, 0.1% Bhujel, 0.1% Maithili, 0.1% Majhi and 0.1% other languages as their first language.

In terms of ethnicity/caste, 24.3% were Chhetri, 19.3% Tharu, 14.1% Kami, 11.5% Tamang, 10.4% Hill Brahmin, 4.5% Thakuri, 3.1% Magar, 2.9% other Dalit, 2.9% Sarki, 2.7% Damai/Dholi, 1.3% Gurung, 0.7% Newar, 0.5% Lohar, 0.5% Sanyasi/Dasnami, 0.3% Badi, 0.2% Gharti/Bhujel, 0.2% Kumal, 0.2% Majhi, 0.1% Halwai, 0.1% Musalman, 0.1% Rai and 0.2% others.

In terms of religion, 84.1% were Hindu, 9.5% Christian, 6.0% Buddhist, 0.2% Prakriti, 0.1% Baháʼí and 0.1% Muslim.

In terms of literacy, 68.0% could read and write, 2.4% could only read and 29.6% could neither read nor write.
