= Belauri =

Municipality in Sudurpashchim Province, Nepal

Belauri Municipality बेलौरी नगरपालिका Shreepur
- Municipality
- Nickname: Belauri Bazzar
- Location in Nepal
- Coordinates: 28.79°N 80.31°E
- Country: Nepal
- Province: Sudurpashchim Province
- District: Kanchanpur District

Government
  - Mayor: Poti Lal Chaudhary (Maoist Center)
  - Deputy Mayor: Jogram Chaudhary (UML)

Population (2020)
  - Total: 53,544
- Time zone: UTC+5:45 (NST)
- Website: www.belaurimun.gov.np

Belauri, The former village development committee was converted into municipality, merging with existing Rampur Bilaspur, Laxmipur and Sreepur village development committee on 18 May 2014. At the time of the 1991 Nepal census it had a population of 14,280 people living in 1877 individual households.

== Demographics ==
At the time of the 2011 Nepal census, Belauri Municipality had a population of 53,609. Of these, 60.5% spoke Tharu, 15.3% Nepali, 11.8% Doteli, 3.3% Baitadeli, 2.8% Bajhangi, 1.8% Achhami, 1.7% Magar, 0.5% Hindi, 0.4% Bajureli, 0.4% Bote, 0.3% Darchuleli, 0.2% Khash, 0.2% Maithili, 0.2% Newar, 0.1% Awadhi, 0.1% Bhojpuri, 0.1% Dailekhi, 0.1% Jumli and 0.1% other languages as their first language.

In terms of ethnicity/caste, 60.7% were Tharu, 13.6% Chhetri, 9.7% Hill Brahmin, 5.2% Thakuri, 3.1% Kami, 2.2% Magar, 1.8% other Dalit, 0.8% Damai/Dholi, 0.6% Sanyasi/Dasnami, 0.4% Bote, 0.3% Gurung, 0.3% Lohar, 0.3% Newar, 0.3% Sarki, 0.2% Badi, 0.1% Terai Brahmin, 0.1% Hajjam/Thakur, 0.1% Kumal, 0.1% Teli, 0.1% other Terai and 0.1% others.

In terms of religion, 95.7% were Hindu, 3.7% Christian, 0.2% Buddhist, 0.1% Baháʼí and 0.1% Prakriti.

In terms of literacy, 70.7% could read and write, 2.3% could only read and 27.0% could neither read nor write.
