= Bhimdatta =

Municipality in Sudurpashchim Province, Nepal

Bhimdatta भीमदत्त Mahendranagar (महेन्द्रनगर)
- Municipality (नगरपालिका)
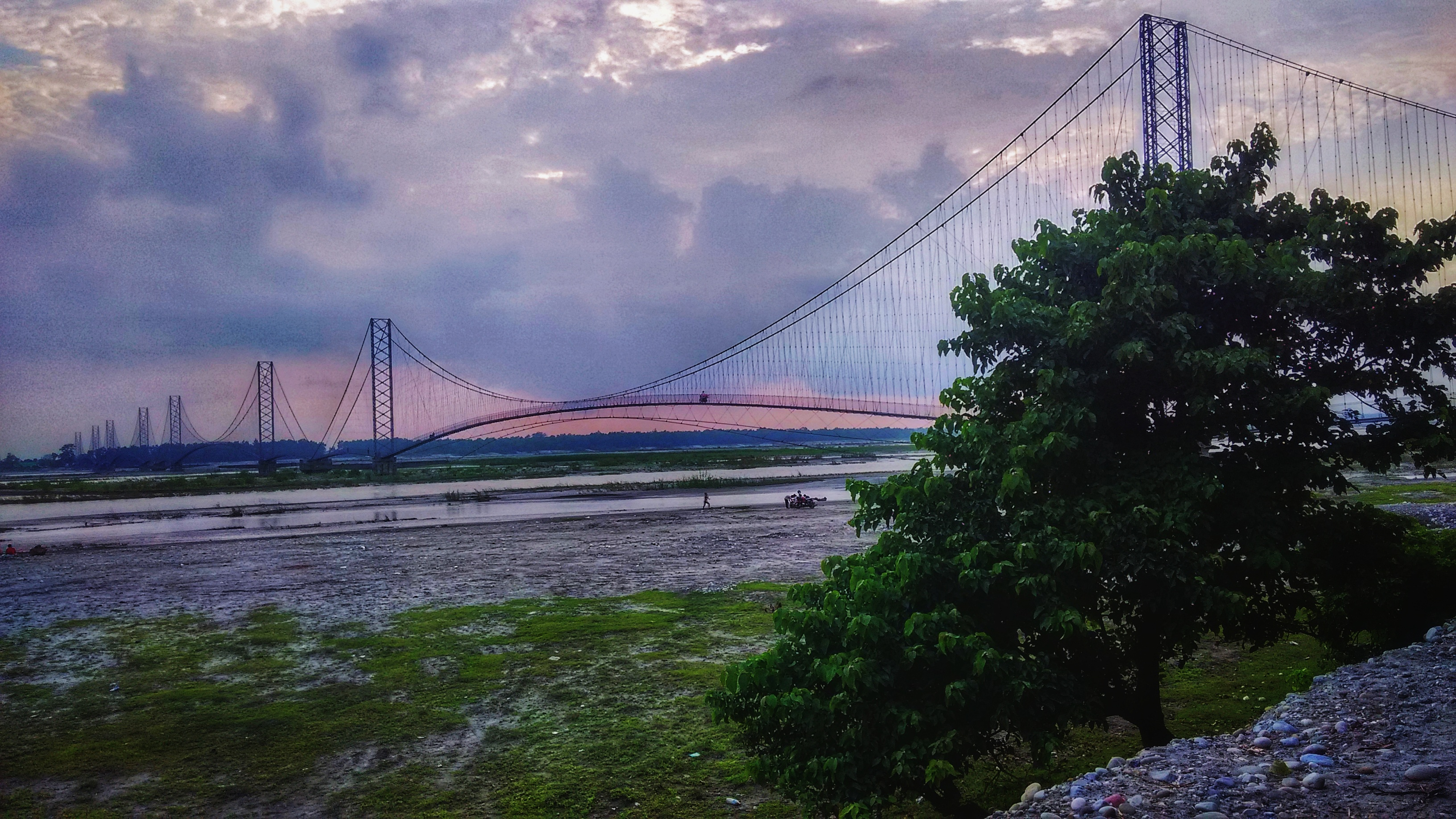
- Dodhara Chandani Bridge

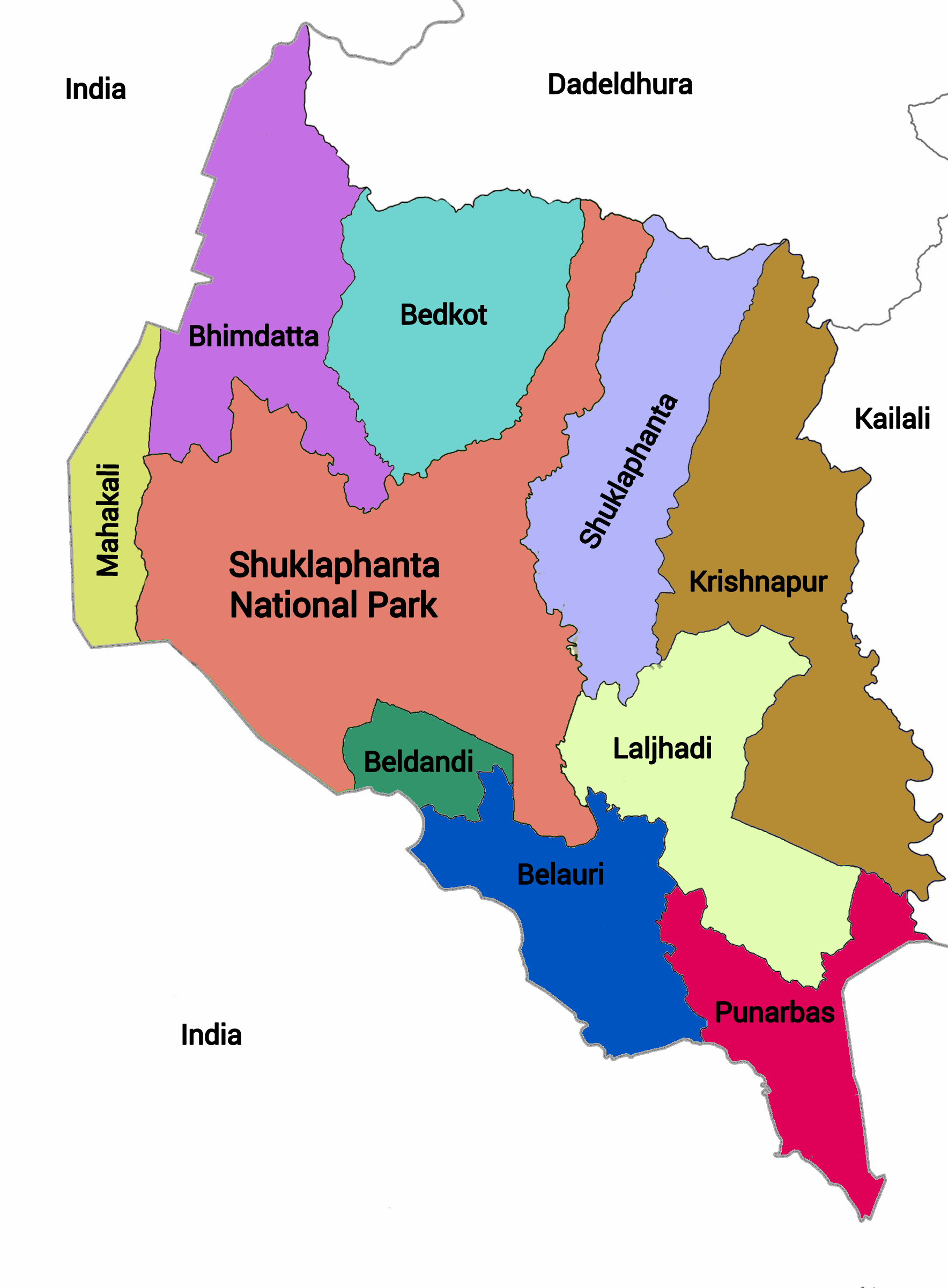
- Bhimdatta municipality in Kanchanpur District

- Location of Bhimdatta in Nepal Bhimdatta (Nepal)
- Coordinates: 28°55′N 80°20′E
- Country: Nepal
- Province: Sudurpashchim
- District: Kanchanpur

Government
  - Mayor: Padam Bogati
  - Deputy Mayor: Nilam Lekhak

Area
  - Total: 171.24 km^{2} (66.12 sq mi)
- Elevation: 229 m (751 ft)

Population (2021)
  - Total: 122,320
  - Density: 714.32/km^{2} (1,850.1/sq mi)
- Time zone: UTC+5:45 (NST)
- Post code: 10400
- Area code: 10406
- Literacy Rate: 77% (age 5+)
- Website: bheemdattamun.gov.np

Mahendranagar (Nepali: महेन्द्रनगर), officially known as Bhimdattanagar (Nepali: भिमदत्त), is a municipality in Kanchanpur District of Sudurpashchim Province, Nepal. The city and the municipality were named Mahendranagar in honour of the late King Mahendra of Nepal. After becoming a republic in 2008, the Mahendranagar municipality name was changed to Bhimdatta municipality in honour of the revolutionary farmer leader Bhimdatta Panta (1926-1953). It is surrounded by Bedkot Municipality in the east, Dadeldhura District in the north, Shuklaphanta National Park in the south and Uttarakhand, India in the west.

Mahendranagar is the 9th largest city in Nepal. It is 5 kilometres (3.1 mi) east of the Indian border and 700 kilometres (430 mi) west of Kathmandu. At the time of the 1991 Nepal census, it had a population of 62,050. According to the census of 2001, the city's population was 80,839. Bhimdatta is a hub of activity for industries running between India and Nepal. It is also a gateway to Shuklaphanta National Park, formerly Shuklaphanta Wildlife Reserve.

== Demographics ==
At the time of the 2011 Nepal census, Bhimdatta Municipality had a population of 106,666. Of these, 58.6% spoke Doteli, 13.3% Nepali, 9.7% Baitadeli, 8.0% Tharu, 4.1% Bajhangi, 1.6% Achhami, 1.3% Darchuleli, 1.2% Hindi, 0.7% Maithili, 0.4% Bajureli, 0.3% Magar, 0.1% Bengali, 0.1% Bhojpuri, 0.1% Dadeldhuri, 0.1% Newar, 0.1% Sonaha, 0.1% Tamang, 0.1% Uranw/Urau and 0.1% other languages as their first language.

In terms of ethnicity/caste, 32.4% were Chhetri, 25.3% Hill Brahmin, 9.6% Thakuri, 8.2% Tharu, 6.6% Kami, 6.2% other Dalit, 2.7% Damai/Dholi, 2.3% Sanyasi/Dasnami, 1.7% Sarki, 1.1% Magar, 0.7% Lohar, 0.4% Kathabaniyan, 0.4% Newar, 0.3% Gurung, 0.2% Badi, 0.2% Hajjam/Thakur, 0.2% Jhangad/Dhagar, 0.2% Musalman, 0.1% Bengali, 0.1% Terai Brahmin, 0.1% foreigners, 0.1% Halwai, 0.1% Limbu, 0.1% Rai, 0.1% Tamang, 0.1% Teli, 0.1% other Terai and 0.1% others.

In terms of religion, 98.6% were Hindu, 0.5% Christian, 0.3% Buddhist, 0.2% Muslim, 0.2% Prakriti and 0.1% others.

In terms of literacy, 77.3% could read and write, 1.7% could only read and 20.9% could neither read nor write.

== Society ==
The indigenous people living here are the Rana-Tharus, but there are also people from other parts mostly from the hill districts Baitadi, Darchula and Dadeldhura. The festivals celebrated by the ethnic Tharu people are Holi and Maghi. Tharu people celebrate Maghi as New Year, while Hill People primarily celebrate Gora (commonly called Gaura Parba). Deepawali or Diwali or Tihar is a major festival which is celebrated with Laxmi Puja, Gai Puja, and Bhai Tika on their respective days. Dashain is also a major festival here. A small population from western Nepal, mainly Arghakhachi, Gulmi, Pyuthan, etc., have settled here (mostly in Bhasi), even before local people of the same region settled from the hills of Far-west Nepal.

== Services ==
Bhimdatta is the business and educational hub of the Sudurpaschim Province. Since it is in close proximity to the border with India, Bhimdatta plays a major role in trade in the region. Students from neighbouring districts come for education. Far-western University, which teaches diversified disciplines ranging from economics to the humanities to the sciences, is the only university in the city. People here are mainly occupied by agriculture as Nepal is an agrarian society. Business is another source of empowering the local economy, which is concentrated in the bazaar area of Bhimdatta. Government services are a significant part of the economy. Being comparatively closer to the major industrial areas of India, Mahendranagar could serve as a portal for industrial exchange between India and Nepal.

== Transport and communication ==
Nepal Telecom and Ncell provide 3G and 4G facilities in the area.

Bhimdatta is connected to other parts of Nepal by East-West Highway, which is the only road that connects it to the rest of Nepal. There is a domestic airport in Bhimdatta which is out of service. Bus service connects Bhimdatta to all the other parts of the country. Bhimdatta is also connected by sub-highways to hill towns Dipayal, Baitadi, Amargadhi, and Darchula.

There is a customs post for goods and third-country nationals, while Indian and Nepalese nationals may cross the border freely. Banbasa, Uttarakhand state, India is the other side of the border. Bhimdatta is the nearest place in Nepal to the Indian state of Uttarakhand.

== Education ==
Mahendranagar is the home of the Far Western University; it has a number of colleges and educational institutes. Shree Siddhanath Science Campus is the first science campus in Mahendranagar and was established in 2033 B.S. It is a constituent campus of Tribhuvan University.

List of notable schools:

- Adarsh Vidya Niketan
- Radiant

== Tourism ==
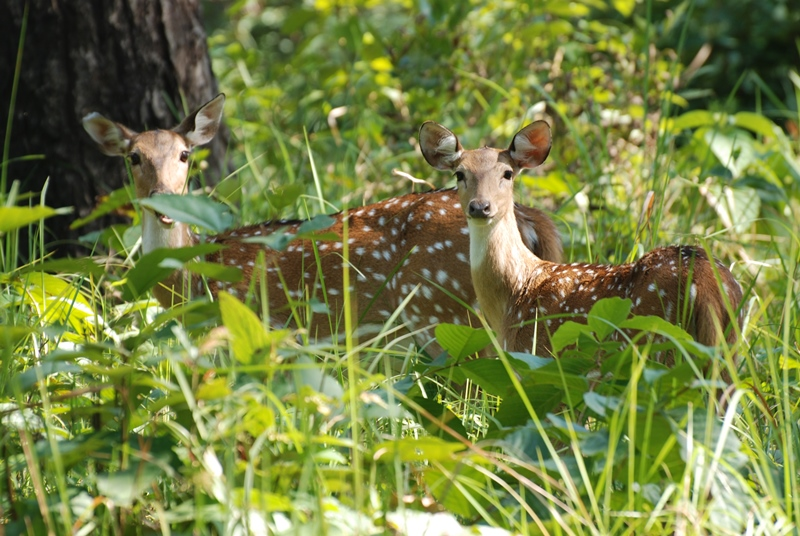
Shuklaphanta National Park

- Linga Dham
- Shuklaphanta National Park
- Jhilmila Lake
- Vishnu Temple

== Media ==
- Radio Mahakali 96.2 MHz
- Shuklaphanta FM 94.4 MHz
- Radio Nagarik FM 104.3 MHz

== Climate ==
Climate data for Bhimdatta (Mahendra Nagar), elevation 197 m (646 ft), (1991–2020 normals)
| Month | Jan | Feb | Mar | Apr | May | Jun | Jul | Aug | Sep | Oct | Nov | Dec | Year |
|---|---|---|---|---|---|---|---|---|---|---|---|---|---|
| Mean daily maximum °C (°F) | 20.0 (68.0) | 24.7 (76.5) | 30.1 (86.2) | 35.5 (95.9) | 37.1 (98.8) | 36.2 (97.2) | 33.3 (91.9) | 33.1 (91.6) | 33.1 (91.6) | 31.4 (88.5) | 27.5 (81.5) | 23.9 (75.0) | 30.5 (86.9) |
| Daily mean °C (°F) | 13.7 (56.7) | 16.8 (62.2) | 21.5 (70.7) | 26.8 (80.2) | 29.9 (85.8) | 30.7 (87.3) | 29.5 (85.1) | 29.3 (84.7) | 28.6 (83.5) | 25.0 (77.0) | 20.0 (68.0) | 16.1 (61.0) | 24.0 (75.2) |
| Mean daily minimum °C (°F) | 7.4 (45.3) | 8.8 (47.8) | 12.9 (55.2) | 18.0 (64.4) | 22.7 (72.9) | 25.2 (77.4) | 25.7 (78.3) | 25.4 (77.7) | 24.1 (75.4) | 18.6 (65.5) | 12.5 (54.5) | 8.3 (46.9) | 17.5 (63.4) |
| Average precipitation mm (inches) | 25.7 (1.01) | 38.5 (1.52) | 19.4 (0.76) | 17.2 (0.68) | 51.7 (2.04) | 254.4 (10.02) | 509.0 (20.04) | 524.7 (20.66) | 297.3 (11.70) | 55.4 (2.18) | 6.2 (0.24) | 15.5 (0.61) | 1,814.9 (71.45) |
Source 1: Department of Hydrology and Meteorology
Source 2: JICA (precipitation)
