= Krishnapur, Nepal =

Municipality in Sudurpashchim Province, Nepal

Krishnapur कृष्णपुर
- Municipality (नगरपालिका)
- Location in Nepal
- Coordinates: 28.88°N 80.35°E
- Country: Nepal
- Province: Sudurpashchim Province
- District: Kanchanpur District

Government
  - Mayor: Hem Raj Ojha (Nepali Congress)
  - Deputy Mayor: Dropadi Rana (Nepali Congress)

Population (2011)
  - Total: 36,706
- Time zone: UTC+5:45 (NST)
- Website: krishnapurmun.gov.np

Krishnapur is a municipality in Kanchanpur District in Sudurpashchim Province of the far-western development region of Nepal. In the 2011 national census, there were 36,706 people living in 6,723 individual households. It was formed as municipality in 2015 by merger of Krishnapur VDC, Raikwar Bichwa VDC and part of Dekathbhuli VDC.

== Demographics ==
At the time of the 2011 Nepal census, Krishnapur Municipality had a population of 56,643. Of these, 46.3% spoke Doteli, 35.6% Tharu, 4.5% Nepali, 4.1% Achhami, 3.1% Magar, 2.5% Baitadeli, 2.2% Bajhangi, 0.7% Darchuleli, 0.3% Bajureli, 0.2% Raji, 0.1% Hindi, 0.1% Maithili and 0.2% other languages as their first language.

In terms of ethnicity/caste, 36.2% were Tharu, 30.1% Chhetri, 12.6% Hill Brahmin, 5.8% Kami, 3.3% other Dalit, 3.2% Magar, 3.0% Thakuri, 1.6% Damai/Dholi, 1.3% Sanyasi/Dasnami, 0.9% Sarki, 0.5% Badi, 0.5% Lohar, 0.2% Raji, 0.1% Chamar/Harijan/Ram, 0.1% Halwai, 0.1% Kumal, 0.1% Newar, 0.1% Rajput, 0.1% Tamang and 0.1% others.

In terms of religion, 95.1% were Hindu, 2.7% Christian, 1.1% Buddhist, 0.8% Prakriti, 0.1% Baháʼí, 0.1% Muslim and 0.1% others.

In terms of literacy, 66.4% could read and write, 2.6% could only read and 31.0% could neither read nor write.

== Economy ==
Krishnapur Municipality is a growing city in Kanchanpur District. The main centre of Krishnapur is Gulariya bazar, located in centre part of Krishnapur Municipality. Other economic centres are Bani Bazar, Banka Bazar, Gulariya Bazar, Chini Mill, etc. The main occupation of people here is agriculture.
