= Kanchanpur District =

Kanchanpur District कञ्चनपुर जिल्ला
- District
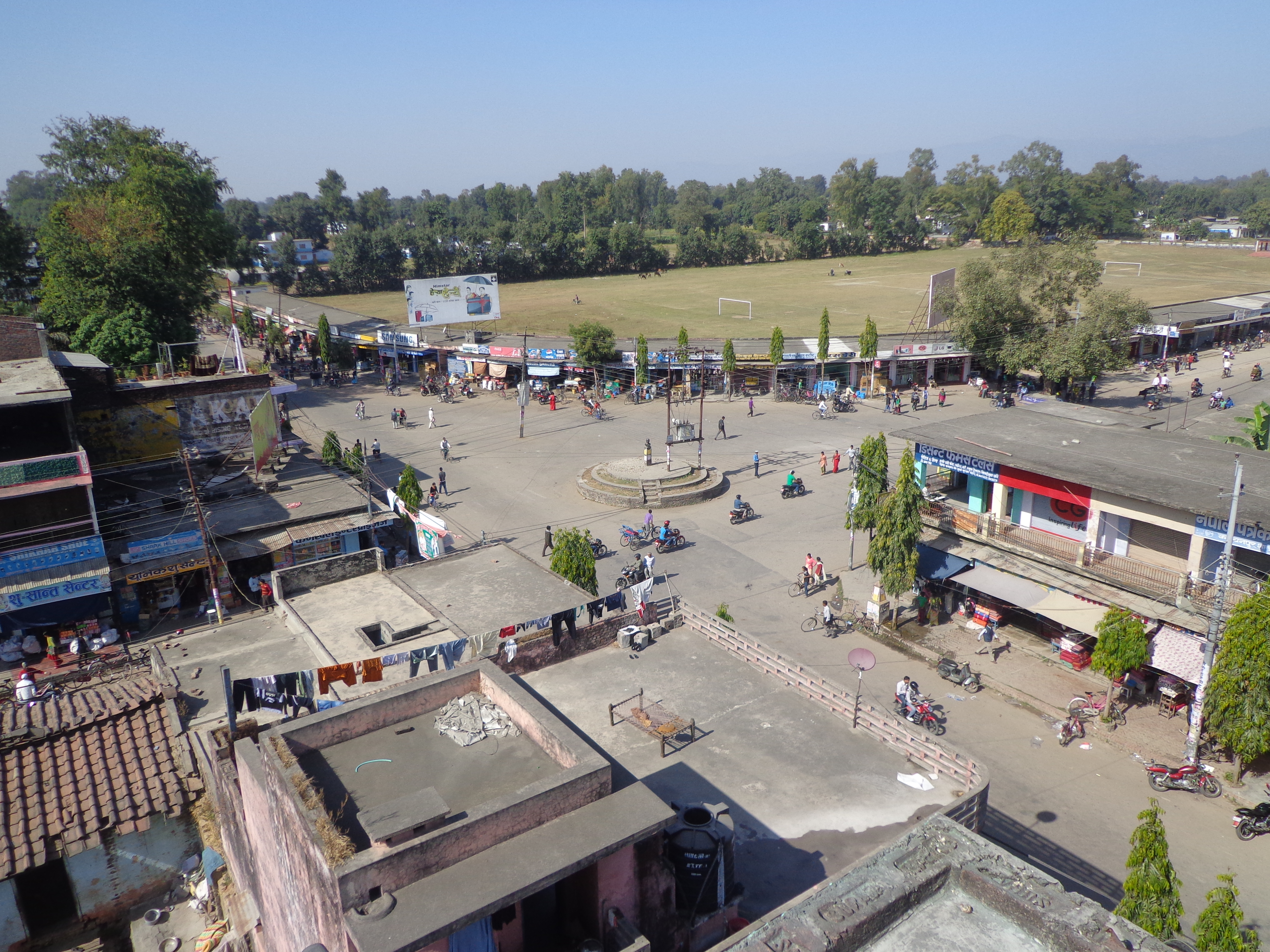
- Madan Chowk at Bhimdatta municipality

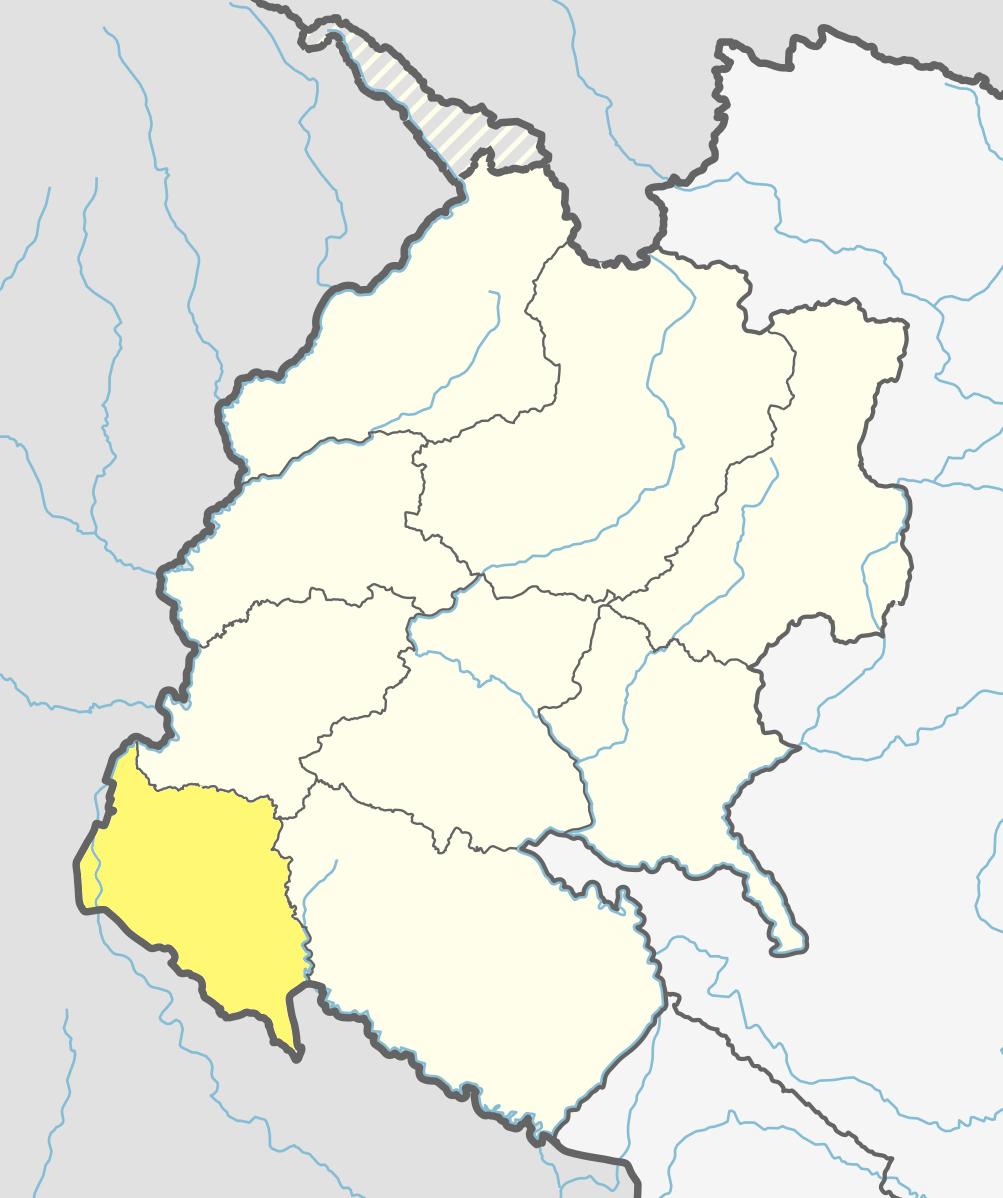
- Location of Kanchanpur District

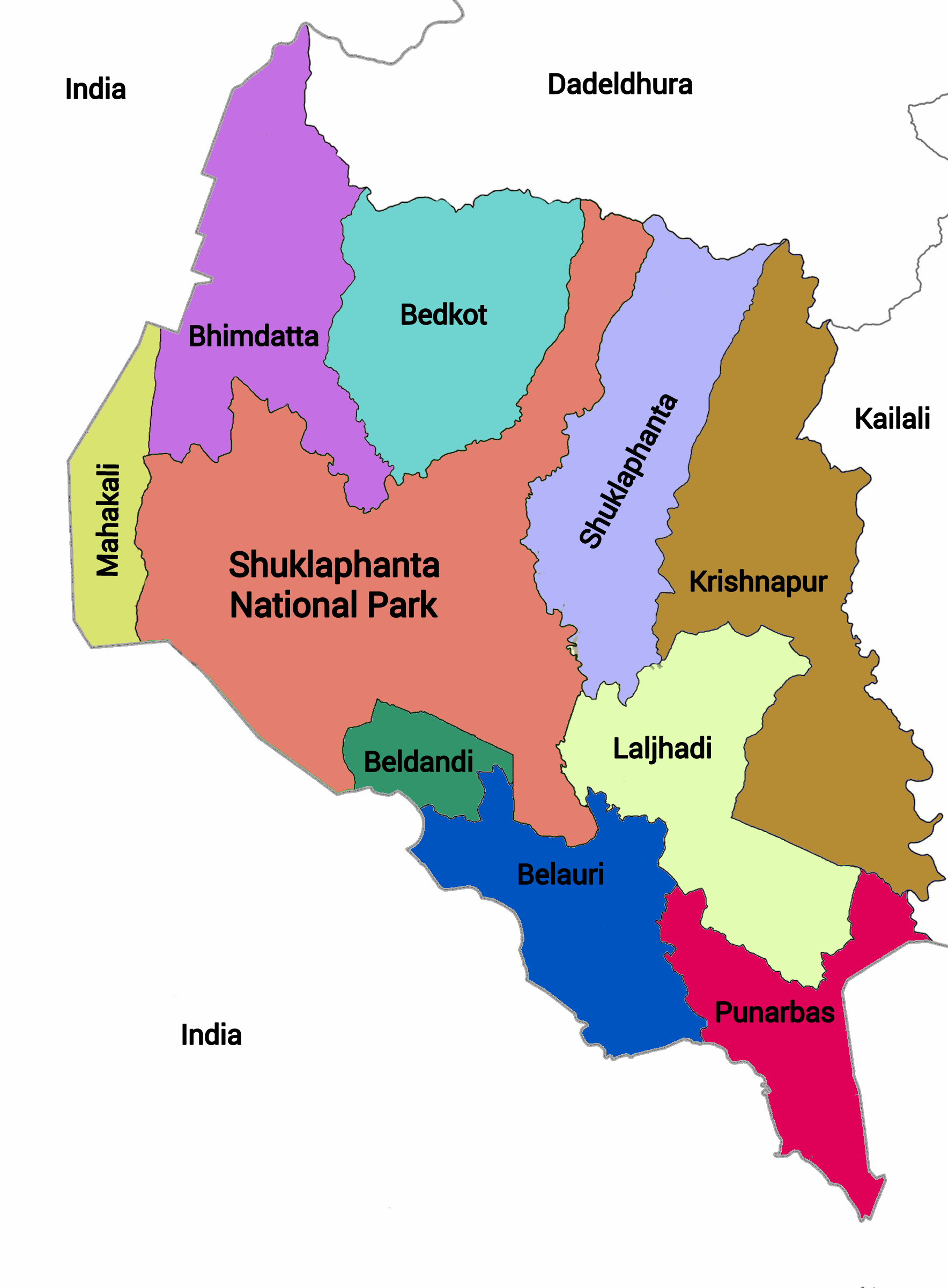
- Divisions of Kanchanpur District
- Coordinates: 28°50′N 80°20′E
- Country: Nepal
- Province: Sudurpashchim Province
- Established: 1860
- Administrative Headquarters: Bheemdatta
- Municipality: List: Urban; Bheemdatta; Punarbas; Bedkot; Dodhara Chandani; Shuklaphanta; Belauri; Krishnapur; Rural; Beldandi; Laljhadi

Government
  - Type: Coordination committee
  - Body: DCC, Kanchanpur
  - Head: Mr. Phairu Tamang
  - Deputy-Head: Mrs. Sanu Kumari Budthapa

Area
  - Total: 1,610 km^{2} (620 sq mi)

Population (2011)
  - Total: 451,248
  - Density: 280/km^{2} (726/sq mi)
- Time zone: UTC+05:45 (NPT)
- Main Language(s): Doteli (37.9%), Tharu (25.4%), Nepali (16.1%), Baitadeli (5.2%), others (15.4%)
- Major highways: Mahendra Highway
- Website: ddckanchanpur.gov.np

Kanchanpur District (Nepali: कञ्चनपुर जिल्ला [ˈkʌnt͡sʌnpur]), a part of Sudurpashchim Province in the Terai plain, is one of seventy-seven districts of Nepal. The district, with Bhimdatta as its district headquarters, covers an area of 1,610 square kilometres (620 sq mi) and had a population of 134,868 in 2001 and 171,304 in 2011. It is located in south-western of Nepal. It is bordered by Kailali district in the east, Dadeldhura district in the north and with India in the south and west.

Before the reunification of Nepal by Gorkha King Prithvi Narayan Shah, this district was part of the Doti Kingdom. Nepal lost it to the East India Company after the Anglo-Nepalese war (1814–1816). Then the Kingdom of Nepal and the East India Company followed by territorial concessions of Sugauli Treaty. Later on after the treaty of 1860, Nepal recovered this land along with Kailali, Banke and Bardiya. Its first headquarters was Belauri Municipality, and the current headquarter, Mahendranagr, was declared in 2019 B.S.

The majority of the population is ethnic Tharu community, and minor groups are the peoples that have migrated from the northern hilly region. The district is renowned for Shuklaphanta National Park and the 1,456.97 metres (4,780 ft) long multi-span suspension bridge over Mahakali River.

Jhilmila Lake, Bedkot Lake, Bandatal, Shovatal, and Vishnu Temple, Ranital are the other tourist attractions.

== Geography ==
The district expands from 28 degrees 38 minutes to 29 degrees 28 minutes Northern latitudes and 80 degrees 03 minutes to 80 degrees 33 minutes Eastern longitudes. It is situated at the end of westmost part of province and country on the corner of the south-west. Geographically it is on the terai, but the northern part of the district has some higher altitudes of elevation. The highest elevation of the district is 1528m, and the lowest is 176m. The main rivers of the region are Mahakali, Jobuda, Chaudhary, Mohana, Syal, Banhara, Sanbora and Doda

Climate Zone	Elevation Range	% of Area
Lower Tropical	below 300 m (1,000 ft)	85.2%
Upper Tropical	300 to 1,000 m (1,000 to 3,300 ft)	13.0%
Subtropical	1,000 to 2,000 m (3,300 to 6,600 ft)	1.8%

== Demographics ==
Historical population
Census year	Pop.	±% p.a.
1981	168,971	—
1991	257,906	+4.32%
2001	377,899	+3.89%
2011	451,248	+1.79%
2021	517,645	+1.38%
Source: Citypopulation

At the time of the 2021 Nepal census, Kanchanpur District had a population of 513,757. 8.05% of the population is under 5 years of age. It has a literacy rate of 79.65% and a sex ratio of 1135 females per 1000 males. 464,101 (90.33%) lived in municipalities.

Castes/ethnic groups in Kanchanpur district (2021)
1. Chhetri (30.9%)
2. Bahun (16.2%)
3. Tharu (13.8%)
4. Rana Tharu (11.7%)
5. Kami (7.82%)
6. Thakuri (5.46%)
7. Damai (3.17%)
8. Lohar (2.39%)
9. Sarki (2.38%)
10. Magar (1.36%)
11. Tamang (1.32%)
12. Others (3.53%)

Khas people make up a majority of the population with 67% of the population. Tharus and Rana Tharus are the largest minority with 26% of the population. Hill Janjatis, mainly Magars and Tamangs, are 3% of the population, while Madheshis (mainly the Lohar caste), are also 3% of the population.

Languages of Kanchanpur district (2021)
1. Nepali (43.6%)
2. Tharu (14.2%)
3. Doteli (12.8%)
4. Rana Tharu (11.1%)
5. Baitadeli (8.12%)
6. Bajhangi (2.78%)
7. Darchuleli (1.36%)
8. Tamang (1.18%)
9. Achhami (1.11%)
10. Dadeldhuri (1.09%)
11. Others (2.66%)

At the time of the 2021 census, 43.57% of the population spoke Nepali, 14.24% Tharu, 12.76% Doteli, 11.13% Rana Tharu, 8.12% Baitadeli, 2.78% Bajhangi, 1.36% Darchuleli, 1.18% Tamang and 1.09% Dadeldhuri as their first language. In 2011, 15.9% of the population spoke Nepali as their first language.

Religion in Kanchanpur District (2021)
Religion	Percent
Hinduism	95.54%
Christianity	3.40%
Buddhism	0.80%
Other or not stated	0.26%

== Divisions ==
Kanchanpur district is divided into 6 municipalities and 2 rural municipalities:

Municipalities

- Bedkot
- Belauri
- Bhimdatta
- Shuklaphanta
- Krishnapur
- Punarbas

Rural municipalities

- Laljhadi
- Beldandi

== Communication and media ==
Websites, Online News Portal, FM Stations and News Papers of Kanchanpur District

- MNR Yellow Pages. Local Search Engine
- NB Media Network
- Suklaphanta FM 99.4 MHz
- Radio Mahakali FM 96.2 MHz
- Radio Belauri 105 MHz
- Belauri Post Weekly
- Dishanirdesh Kanchan Post Weekly
- Farwest Times
- Chure Times
- Mahendranagar Post
- Abhiyan Daily
- Paschim Nepal Daily
- Dainik Khabar Daily
- New Janakranti Daily
- Radio Nagarik FM 104.3 MHz
- Radio Rastriya 89.8 MHz
- Radio Barasinga 102.2 MHz
- Radio Paschim Nepal 91.0 MHz
- Radio Kanchanpur 90.2 MHz
- Radio Pahichaan FM 105.3 MHz
- Radio Sudur Sanchar 100.4 MHz
- Radio Jhalari FM 105.9 MHz
- Prabhu FM 102.5 MHz

== Lakes In Kanchanpur District ==
- Banda lake
- Bedkot lake
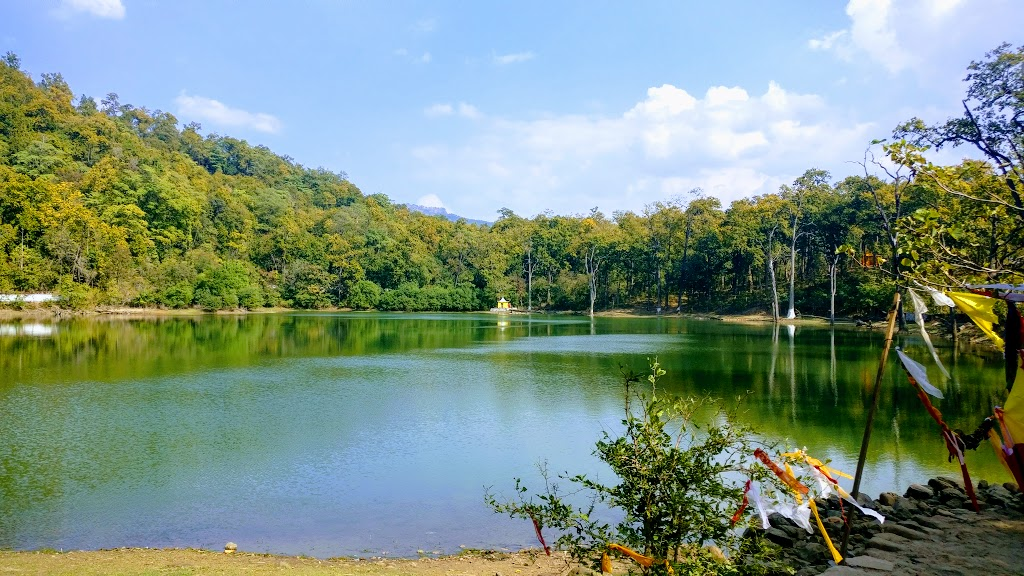
  Bedkot lake
- Pyara lake
- Jhilmila lake
- Shova lake
- Shuklaphanta lake
- Ranital
