= Khag Raj Bhatta cabinet =

Incumbent Council of Ministers of Sudurpashchim Province, since 2026

- 6th Council of Ministers of Sudurpashchim Province
- 2026–present
- Date formed: 14 August 2026

People and organisations
- Governor: Najir Miya
- Chief Minister: Khag Raj Bhatta
- Chief Minister's history: Member of the Sudurpashchim Provincial Assembly (2023–present); Leader of the Opposition in the Sudurpashchim Provincial Assembly (2023–2023, 2025–2026)
- No. of ministers: 10 members; Chief minister; 6 ministers; 3 minister of state
- Member parties: NCP; CPN (UML)
- Status in legislature: Provincial Assembly 33 / 53 (62%)
- Opposition party: Nepali Congress
- Opposition leader: Kamal Bahadur Shah

History
- Election: 2022
- Legislature term: 5 years
- Predecessor: Second Kamal Bahadur Shah cabinet

The Khag Raj Bhatta cabinet is the current and sixth provincial government of Sudurpaschim Province. It was formed on 14 August 2026, following his appointment as the fifth Chief Minister of province. Bhatta was appointed chief minister as per Article 168(2) of the constitution, after Kamal Bahadur Shah of the Nepali Congress resigned from the Chief Minister on 13 August 2026.

== History ==
Bhatta's claim for chief minister was supported by the Communist Party of Nepal (Unified Marxist–Leninist), alongside his own Nepali Communist Party. Chief Minister Bhatta and 4 others ministers including one minister of state took their oaths of office on 14 August 2026.

On 19 August 2026, Bhatta won a vote of confidence with 31 votes in favor, 15 votes against, out of the 46 members present in the 53-member Sudurpashchim Provincial Assembly. On 21 August 2026, the cabinet was expanded to include three ministers and two ministers of state.

== Council of ministers ==
| S.N. | Portfolio | Minister | Political Party | Assumed office | Left office |
|---|---|---|---|---|---|
Cabinet ministers
| 1 | Office of the Chief Minister and Council of Ministers | Khag Raj Bhatta | NCP | 14 August 2026 | Incumbent |
| 2 | Minister for Industry, Tourism, Forest and Environment | Prakash Rawal | NCP | 21 August 2026 | Incumbent |
| 3 | Minister for Social Development | Santosh Kumari Sharma Thapa | CPN (UML) | 14 August 2026 | Incumbent |
| 4 | Minister for Economic Affairs | Chakra Bahadur Malla | CPN (UML) | 14 August 2026 | Incumbent |
| 5 | Minister for Physical Infrastructure Development | Om Bikram Bhat | NCP | 21 August 2026 | Incumbent |
| 6 | Minister for Land Management, Agriculture and Cooperatives | Daman Bahadur Bhandari | CPN (UML) | 14 August 2026 | Incumbent |
| 7 | Minister for Internal Affairs and Law | Khushi Ram Dagoura Tharu | NCP | 21 August 2026 | Incumbent |
State ministers
| 8 | Minister of State for Industry, Tourism, Forest and Environment | Indira Giri | NCP | 21 August 2026 | Incumbent |
| 9 | Minister of State for Economic Affairs | Janaki Ayer Bam | CPN (UML) | 14 August 2026 | Incumbent |
| 10 | Minister of State for Physical Infrastructure | Janaki Devi Kunwar | NCP | 21 August 2026 | Incumbent |

== See also ==
- Third Hikmat Kumar Karki cabinet
