= List of ministries of Nepal =

The Government of Nepal exercises its executive authority through a number of government ministries. The ministries are headed by a cabinet minister, who sits in the Council of Ministers, and is sometimes supported by a minister of state.

== Federal government ==
This is a comprehensive list of all federal ministries of Nepal. The full list of ministries and ministers under the Balen Shah government formed after the 2026 Nepali general election.

S.N.	Ministry	नेपालीमा	Minister responsible	Ref.
1	Office of the Prime Minister and Council of Ministers	प्रधानमन्त्री तथा मन्त्रिपरिषद्को कार्यालय	Balendra Shah	
2	Ministry of Defence	रक्षा मन्त्रालय	Balendra Shah	
3	Ministry of Finance	अर्थ मन्त्रालय	Swarnim Wagle	
4	Ministry of Foreign Affairs	परराष्ट्र मन्त्रालय	Shishir Khanal	
5	Ministry of Energy, Water Resources and Irrigation	ऊर्जा, जलस्रोत तथा सिँचाइ मन्त्रालय	Biraj Bhakta Shrestha	
6	Ministry of Home Affairs	गृह मन्त्रालय	Sudan Gurung	
7	Ministry of Infrastructure Development	पूर्वाधार विकास मन्त्रालय	Sunil Lamsal	
8	Ministry of Law, Justice and Parliamentary Affairs	कानुन, न्याय तथा संसदीय मामिला मन्त्रालय	Sobita Gautam	
9	Ministry of Science, Technology and Innovation	विज्ञान, प्रविधि तथा नवप्रवर्तन मन्त्रालय	Mahabir Pun	
10	Ministry of Women, Children, Gender and Sexual Minorities and Social Security	महिला, बालबालिका, लैङ्गिक तथा यौनिक अल्पसंख्यक र सामाजिक सुरक्षा मन्त्रालय	Sita Badi	
11	Ministry of Land Management, Cooperatives, Federal Affairs and General Administration	भूमि व्यवस्था, सहकारी, संघीय मामिला तथा सामान्य प्रशासन मन्त्रालय	Pratibha Rawal	
12	Ministry of Health and Food Safety	स्वास्थ्य तथा खाद्य स्वच्छता मन्त्रालय	Nisha Mehta	
13	Ministry of Education and Sports	शिक्षा तथा खेलकुद मन्त्रालय	Sasmit Pokharel	
14	Ministry of Culture, Tourism and Civil Aviation	संस्कृति, पर्यटन तथा नागरिक उड्डयन मन्त्रालय	Khadak Raj Paudel	
15	Ministry of Information and Communication	सूचना तथा सञ्चार मन्त्रालय	Bikram Timilsina	
16	Ministry of Agriculture, Forests and Environment	कृषि, वन तथा पर्यावरण मन्त्रालय	Geeta Chaudhary	
17	Ministry of Youth, Labour and Employment	युवा, श्रम तथा रोजगार मन्त्रालय	Ramjee Yadav	
18	Ministry of Industry, Commerce and Supplies	उद्योग, वाणिज्य तथा आपूर्ति मन्त्रालय	Deepak Kumar Sah	

== Provincial government ==
The ministries of provinces in Nepal are as follows.

=== Koshi Province ===
S.N.	Ministry	Nepali	Minister responsible	Ref.
1	Office of the Chief Minister and Council of Ministers	मुख्यमन्त्री तथा मन्त्रिपरिषद्को कार्यालय	Hikmat Kumar Karki	
2	Ministry of Economic Affairs and Planning	आर्थिक मामिला तथा योजना मन्त्रालय	Bidur Kumar Lingthep	
3	Ministry of Physical Infrastructure Development	भौतिक पूर्वाधार विकास मन्त्रालय	Jivan Acharya	
4	Ministry of Social Development	सामाजिक विकास मन्त्रालय	Geeta Timsina	
5	Ministry of Water Supply, Irrigation and Energy	खानेपानी, सिँचाई तथा ऊर्जा मन्त्रालय	Tilchan Pathak	
6	Ministry of Internal Affairs and Law	आन्तरिक मामिला तथा कानुन मन्त्रालय	Gombu Sherpa	
7	Ministry of Tourism, Forests and Environment	पर्यटन, वन तथा वातावरण मन्त्रालय	Khinu Langwa Limbu	
8	Ministry of Industry, Agriculture and Cooperatives	उद्योग, कृषि तथा सहकारी मन्त्रालय	Ram Prasad Mahato	
9	Ministry of Health	स्वास्थ्य मन्त्रालय	Indra Mani Parajuli	

=== Madhesh Province ===
S.N.	Ministry	Nepali	Minister responsible	Ref.
1	Office of the Chief Minister and Council of Ministers	मुख्यमन्त्री तथा मन्त्रिपरिषद्को कार्यालय	Krishna Prasad Yadav	
2	Ministry of Finance	अर्थ मन्त्रालय	Yubaraj Bhattarai	
3	Ministry of Home, Communication and Law	गृह, सञ्चार तथा कानुन मन्त्रालय	Fakira Mahato	
4	Ministry of Forests and Environment	वन तथा वातावरण मन्त्रालय	Shankar Prasad Chaudhary	
5	Ministry of Physical Infrastructure Development	भौतिक पूर्वाधार विकास मन्त्रालय	Mohammad Samir	
6	Ministry of Land Management, Agriculture and Cooperatives	भूमि व्यवस्था, कृषि तथा सहकारी मन्त्रालय	Shyam Prasad Patel	
7	Ministry of Health and Population	स्वास्थ्य तथा जनसंख्या मन्त्रालय	Nagendra Sah	
8	Ministry of Energy, Irrigation and Drinking Water	ऊर्जा, सिंचाई तथा खानेपानी मन्त्रालय	Jawahar Lal Kushwaha	
9	Ministry of Education and Culture	शिक्षा तथा संस्कृति मन्त्रालय	Rani Kumari Tiwari	
10	Ministry of Industry, Commerce and Tourism	उद्योग, वाणिज्य तथा पर्यटन मन्त्रालय	Kanish Patel	
11	Ministry of Labour and Transport	श्रम तथा यातायात मन्त्रालय	Sharada Devi Thapa	
12	Ministry of Sports and Social Welfare	खेलकुद तथा समाज कल्याण मन्त्रालय	Lakhan Das Tatma	

=== Bagmati Province ===
S.N.	Ministry	Nepali	Minister responsible	Ref.
1	Office of the Chief Minister and Council of Ministers	मुख्यमन्त्री तथा मन्त्रिपरिषद्को कार्यालय	Kiran Thapa Magar	
2	Ministry of Economic Affairs and Planning	आर्थिक मामिला तथा योजना मन्त्रालय	Saral Samyatri Paudel	
3	Ministry of Drinking Water, Energy and Irrigation	खानेपानी, ऊर्जा तथा सिँचाई मन्त्रालय	Raju Bista	
4	Ministry of Physical Infrastructure Development	भौतिक पूर्वाधार विकास मन्त्रालय	Bharat Bahadur KC	
5	Ministry of Internal Affairs, Law and Cooperatives	आन्तरिक मामिला, कानून तथा सहकारी मन्त्रालय	Kiran Thapa Magar	
6	Ministry of Health and Social Development	स्वास्थ्य तथा सामाजिक विकास मन्त्रालय	Gir Bahadur Tamang	
7	Ministry of Agriculture, Livestock, Forests and Environment	कृषि, पशुपन्छी, वन तथा वातावरण मन्त्रालय	Urmila Nepal	
8	Ministry of Industry, Tourism, Labour and Transport	उद्योग, पर्यटन, श्रम तथा यातायात मन्त्रालय	Rajendra Prajapati	

=== Gandaki Province ===
S.N.	Ministry	Nepali	Minister responsible	Ref.
1	Office of the Chief Minister and Council of Ministers	मुख्यमन्त्री तथा मन्त्रिपरिषद्को कार्यालय	Surendra Raj Pandey	
2	Ministry of Physical Infrastructure Development and Transport Management	भौतिक पूर्वाधार विकास तथा यातायात व्यवस्था मन्त्रालय	Nanda Prasad Neupane	
3	Ministry of Energy, Water Resources and Drinking Water	ऊर्जा, जलस्रोत तथा खानेपानी मन्त्रालय	Phanindra Devkota	
4	Ministry of Economic Affairs	आर्थिक मामिला मन्त्रालय	Jit Bahadur Sherchan	
5	Ministry of Agriculture, Land Management and Cooperatives	कृषि, भूमि व्यवस्था तथा सहकारी मन्त्रालय	Surendra Raj Pandey	
6	Ministry of Industry and Tourism	उद्योग तथा पर्यटन मन्त्रालय	Surendra Raj Pandey	
7	Ministry of Social Development, Youth and Sports	सामाजिक विकास, युवा तथा खेलकुद मन्त्रालय	Rekha Gurung	
8	Ministry of Health	स्वास्थ्य मन्त्रालय	Nanda Prasad Neupane	
9	Ministry of Forests and Environment	वन तथा वातावरण मन्त्रालय	Namdu Gurung	

=== Lumbini Province ===
S.N.	Ministry	Nepali	Minister responsible	Ref.
1	Office of the Chief Minister and Council of Ministers	मुख्यमन्त्री तथा मन्त्रिपरिषद्को कार्यालय	Chet Narayan Acharya	
2	Ministry of Agriculture, Land Management and Cooperatives	कृषि, भूमि व्यवस्था तथा सहकारी मन्त्रालय	Krishna Kushma Tharu	
3	Ministry of Energy, Water Resources and Irrigation	ऊर्जा, जलस्रोत तथा सिंचाई मन्त्रालय	Dilli Raj Bhusal	
4	Ministry of Health	स्वास्थ्य मन्त्रालय	Dipendra Kumar Pun	
5	Ministry of Physical Infrastructure Development	भौतिक पूर्वाधार विकास मन्त्रालय	Ratna Bahadur Khatri	
6	Ministry of Internal Affairs and Law	आन्तरिक मामिला तथा कानून मन्त्रालय	Bhandari Lal Ahir	
7	Ministry of Youth and Sports	युवा तथा खेलकुद मन्त्रालय	Santosh Kumar Pandey	

=== Karnali Province ===
S.N.	Ministry	Nepali	Minister responsible	Ref.
1	Office of the Chief Minister and Council of Ministers	मुख्यमन्त्री तथा मन्त्रिपरिषद्को कार्यालय	Mangal Bahadur Shahi	
2	Ministry of Economic Affairs and Planning	आर्थिक मामिला तथा योजना मन्त्रालय	Tekraj Pachhai	
3	Ministry of Physical Infrastructure and Urban Development	भौतिक पूर्वाधार तथा शहरी विकास मन्त्रालय	Milan Khadka Roka	
4	Ministry of Social Development	सामाजिक विकास मन्त्रालय	Jit Bahadur Malla	
5	Ministry of Industry, Tourism, Forest and Environment	उद्योग, पर्यटन, वन तथा वातावरण मन्त्रालय	Kalyani Khadka	
6	Ministry of Land Management, Agriculture and Cooperatives	भूमि व्यवस्था, कृषि तथा सहकारी मन्त्रालय	Jumkit Lama Karki	
7	Ministry of Water Resources and Energy Development	जलस्रोत तथा ऊर्जा विकास मन्त्रालय	Kal Bahadur Hamal	

=== Sudurpashchim Province ===
S.N.	Ministry	Nepali	Minister responsible	Ref.
1	Office of the Chief Minister and Council of Ministers	मुख्यमन्त्री तथा मन्त्रिपरिषद्को कार्यालय	Khag Raj Bhatta	
2	Ministry of Physical Infrastructure Development	भौतिक पूर्वाधार विकास मन्त्रालय	Om Bikram Bhat	
3	Ministry of Internal Affairs and Law	आन्तरिक मामिला तथा कानून मन्त्रालय	Daman Bahadur Bhandari	
4	Ministry of Land Management, Agriculture and Cooperatives	भूमि व्यवस्था, कृषि तथा सहकारी मन्त्रालय	Khushiram Dagarura Tharu	
5	Ministry of Economic Affairs	आर्थिक मामिला मन्त्रालय	Chakra Bahadur Malla	
6	Ministry of Social Development	सामाजिक विकास मन्त्रालय	Santosh Kumari Sharma Thapa	
7	Ministry of Industry, Tourism, Forest and Environment	उद्योग, पर्यटन, वन तथा वातावरण मन्त्रालय	Prakash Rawal	

== See also ==
- List of Nepal government organizations
