= All Nepal National Free Students Union =

All Nepal National Free Students Union may refer to:

- All Nepal National Free Students Union (UML)
- All Nepal National Free Students Union (Unified Socialist)
- All Nepal National Free Students Union (Sixth)
- All Nepal National Independent Students' Union (Revolutionary)
- All Nepal National Independent Students Union (Unified)

== See also ==
- All Nepal National Independent Students Union (disambiguation)
