= Prithvi Bahadur Singh =

Nepalese politician (1960–2023)

- पृथ्वी बहादुर सिंह

Minister for Internal Affairs and Law of Sudurpashchim Province
- In office 20 May 2023 – 20 June 2023
- Governor: Dev Raj Joshi
- Chief Minister: Kamal Bahadur Shah
- Preceded by: Ran Bahadur Rawal
- Succeeded by: Shiv Raj Bhatta

Member of the Sudurpashchim Provincial Assembly
- In office 30 December 2022 – 20 June 2023
- Preceded by: Arjun Bahadur Thapa
- Succeeded by: Daman Bahadur Bhandari
- Constituency: Bajhang 1 (A)

Personal details
- Born: 31 January 1960
- Died: 20 June 2023 (aged 63) Bajhang District, Nepal
- Cause of death: Road accident
- Party: Nepali Congress
- Spouse: Amrita Singh
- Occupation: Politician

Prithvi Bahadur Singh (Nepali: पृथ्वी बहादुर सिंह; 31 January 1960 – 20 June 2023) was a Nepalese politician who served as the Minister for Internal Affairs and Law of Sudurpashchim Province. He was a member of the Sudurpashchim Provincial Assembly, having won the 2022 Nepalese provincial election from Bajhang 1 (A) constituency.

Singh, along with his wife and sister-in-law, died in a road accident on 20 June 2023 while travelling from Dadeldhura to Chainpur, the district headquarters of Bajhang, when his vehicle plunged some 50 metres off the road onto the bank of the Kalanga River at Dharchhada in Kedarsyu Rural Municipality.

== Electoral history ==
=== 2022 provincial elections ===
==== Bajhang 1(A) ====
Candidate	Party	Votes	%
Prithvi Bahadur Singh	Nepali Congress	17,112	54.71
Aphilal Okheda	CPN (UML)	13,336	42.64
Others		830	2.65
Total		31,278	100.00
Valid votes		31,278	100.00
Invalid/blank votes		0	0.00
Total votes		31,278	100.00
Majority		3,776	
Nepali Congress gain from CPN (UML)			

=== 2017 general election ===
==== Bajhang 1 ====
Candidate	Party	Votes	%
Bhairav Bahadur Singh	CPN (Unified Marxist–Leninist)	34,602	54.64
Prithvi Bahadur Singh	Nepali Congress	26,910	42.49
Others		1,820	2.87
Total		63,332	100.00
Valid votes		63,332	100.00
Invalid/blank votes		0	0.00
Total votes		63,332	100.00
Majority		7,692	
CPN (Unified Marxist–Leninist) hold			
