= Khema Devi Bista =

Nepalese female politician

- खेमा देवी विष्ट

Member of the Sudurpashchim Provincial Assembly
- Incumbent
- Assumed office 30 December 2022

Personal details
- Born: Kailali District, Nepal
- Party: Rastriya Prajatantra Party
- Other political affiliations: Rastriya Prajatantra Party

Khema Devi Bista (Nepali: खेमा देवी विष्ट) is a Nepalese politician and currently serving as a member of the 2nd Sudurpashchim Provincial Assembly since 30 December 2022. In the 2022 Nepalese provincial election she was elected as a proportional representative from the Khas people category.
