= Ain Bahadur Mahar =

Nepalese politician

Honourable Ain Bahadur Mahar
- ऐन बहादुर महर
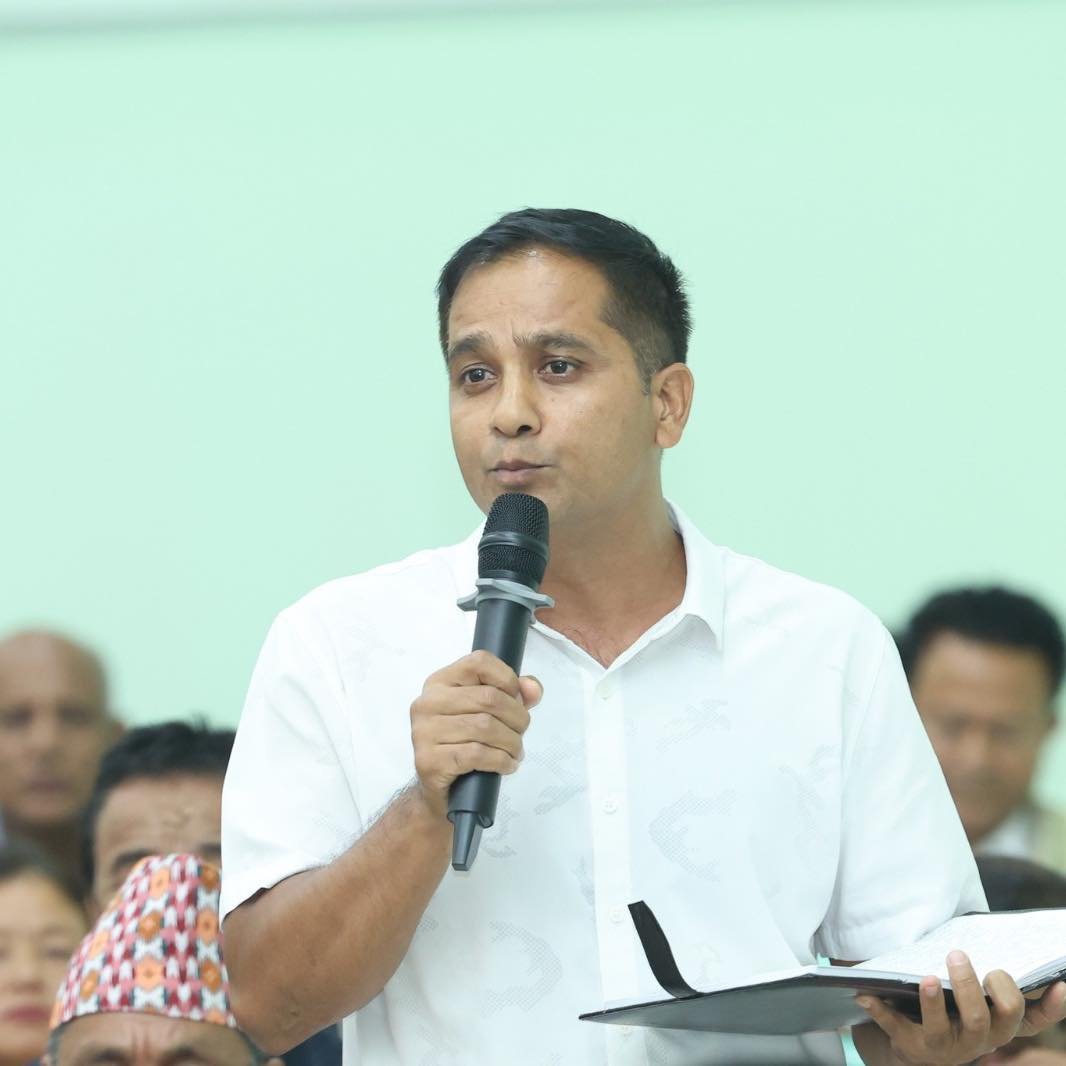
- Ain Bahadur Mahar

Member of Parliament, Pratinidhi Sabha
- Incumbent
- Assumed office 26 March 2026
- Preceded by: Bhanu Bhakta Joshi
- Constituency: Bajhang 1

Chief Whip for CPN (UML), 7th House of Representatives
- Incumbent
- Assumed office 24 April 2026

Personal details
- Born: 15 March 1984 (age 42)
- Party: CPN (UML)
- Spouse: Sanuja Shrestha
- Parents: Ram Dhoj Mahar (father); Ratna Devi Mahar (mother)

Ain Bahadur Mahar is a Nepalese politician currently a member of Parliament (MP) for Bajhang 1 from the CPN (UML). He is currently serving as the Chief Whip of CPN (UML).

== Early life and education ==
Mahar completed his SLC from Suni Pipalchaur High School. He completed his master's degree from Tri-Chandra Multiple Campus and bachelor's degree from Amrit Campus. He is currently pursuing an MPhil in Peace, Conflict and Development.

== Political career ==
Mahar started his political career with All Nepal National Free Students Union from Askal Campus in 1998. He became a central member at the 19th session of the ANNFSU held in Pokhara in 2007, a secretariat member in 2009, vice-president in 2013. He was also the president of ANNFSU for Karnali and Sudurpashchim. Mahar was the Kathmandu Valley in-charge of the Youth Force. He was elected as the president of the All Nepal National Free Students Union in May 2019.

He contested the 2022 general election from Bajhang 1 but lost. He was elected as a central committee member of CPN (UML) at the party's 11th convention. He was elected from Bajhang 1 at the 2026 general election.

== Legal issues ==
Mahar was arrested in connection with a shootout in Tri-Chandra College in 2009. He was arrested after a case was filed against him for defamation and character assassination in August 2025, but was released on bail in December 2025
