= Tulashi Devkota =

Nepalese female politician

- तुलसी देवकाेटा

Member of the Sudurpashchim Provincial Assembly
- Incumbent
- Assumed office 30 December 2022

Personal details
- Born: 14 April 1966 (age 60) Godawari, Kailali District, Nepal
- Party: Nepali Congress
- Spouse: Shankar Prasad Devkota
- Parents: Late Man Bahadur Bhandari (father); Durga Devi Bhandari (mother)
- Profession: Politician; Social Work

Tulashi Devkota (Nepali: तुलसी देवकाेटा) is a Nepalese politician and currently serving as the Chairperson of the Provincial Assembly Committee on Privileges. She also a member of the 2nd Sudurpashchim Provincial Assembly since 30 December 2022. In the 2022 Nepalese provincial election, she was elected as a proportional representative from the Khas people category.
