= Nirmala Devi Saud =

Nepalese female politician (born 1980)

Honourable Nirmala Devi Saud
- निर्मला देवी साउँद

Minister of State for Physical Infrastructure Development of Sudurpashchim Province
- In office 5 August 2024 – 15 July 2026
- Governor: Najir Miya
- Chief Minister: Kamal Bahadur Shah
- Preceded by: Sushila Budhathoki
- Succeeded by: Janaki Devi Kunwar

Member of the Sudurpashchim Provincial Assembly
- Incumbent
- Assumed office 30 December 2022

Personal details
- Born: 9 March 1980 (age 46) Chaurpati, Achham District, Nepal
- Party: Communist Party of Nepal (Unified Marxist–Leninist)
- Spouse: Man Bir Saud
- Parents: Jai Bahadur Saud (father); Cheeumati Saud (mother)
- Profession: Politician

Nirmala Devi Saud (Nepali: निर्मला देवी साउँद) is a Nepalese politician and currently serving as a member of the 2nd Sudurpashchim Provincial Assembly since 30 December 2022. In the 2022 Nepalese provincial election she was elected as a proportional representative from the Khas people category. She has previously served as the Minister of State for Physical Infrastructure Development from August 2024 to July 2026.

Saud served as the parliamentary party whip of the CPN UML in the Provincial Assembly from June 2023 to August 2024, and again in August 2026.
