= Bir Bhadur Thapa =

Nepalese politician (born 1973)

- बिर बहादुर थापा

Minister for Land Management, Agriculture and Cooperatives of Sudurpashchim Province
- In office 5 August 2024 – 15 July 2026
- Governor: Najir Miya
- Chief Minister: Kamal Bahadur Shah
- Preceded by: Tika Thapa
- Succeeded by: Daman Bahadur Bhandari

Minister for Forests, Environment and Cooperatives of Sudurpashchim Province
- In office 30 June 2024 – 4 July 2024
- Governor: Najir Miya
- Chief Minister: Dirgha Bahadur Sodari
- Preceded by: Position established
- Succeeded by: Position dissolved

Member of the Sudurpashchim Provincial Assembly
- Incumbent
- Assumed office 30 December 2022
- Preceded by: Tara Lama Tamang
- Constituency: Kanchanpur 1 (A)

Personal details
- Born: 4 June 1973 (age 53) Masta, Bajhang District, Nepal
- Party: Communist Party of Nepal (Unified Marxist–Leninist)
- Other political affiliations: Nepal Communist Party
- Spouse: Manasara Thapa
- Parents: Kalak Bahadur Thapa (father); Kali Devi Thapa (mother)
- Profession: Politician

Bir Bhadur Thapa (Nepali: बिर बहादुर थापा) is a Nepalese politician and currently serving as a member of the Sudurpashchim Provincial Assembly since 30 December 2022, having won the 2022 Nepalese provincial election from Kanchanpur 1 (A) constituency. Thapa has previously served as the Minister for Forests, Environment and Cooperative from 30 June to 4 July 2024 and as Minister for Land Management, Agriculture and Cooperatives from 5 August 2024 to 15 July 2026.

== Electoral history ==
=== 2022 provincial elections ===
==== Kanchanpur 1 (A) ====
Candidate	Party	Votes	%
Bir Bhadur Thapa	CPN (Unified Marxist–Leninist)	12,385	42.25
Bandhu Rana	Nepali Congress	11,027	37.62
Bhakta Bahadur Adhikari	Independent	2,512	8.57
Paltu Rana	Nagrik Unmukti Party	2,062	7.03
Khem Raj Lamichhane	Rastriya Prajatantra Party	1,327	4.53
Total		29,313	100.00
Majority		1,358	
CPN (Unified Marxist–Leninist) hold			
