= Lalita Sunar =

Nepalese female politician

- ललिता सुनार

Member of the Sudurpashchim Provincial Assembly
- Incumbent
- Assumed office 30 December 2022

Personal details
- Born: 31 October 1966 (age 59) Dhangadhi, Kailali District, Nepal
- Party: Nepali Congress
- Parents: Sitaram Sunar (father); Kamala Sunar (mother)
- Profession: Politician

Lalita Sunar (Nepali: ललिता सुनार) is a Nepalese politician and currently serving as a member of the 2nd Sudurpashchim Provincial Assembly since 30 December 2022. In the 2022 Nepalese provincial election she was elected as a proportional representative from the Dalit people category.
