= Surya Subedi =

British-Nepalese barrister and international law scholar

Surya P. Subedi OBE KC DCL LLD
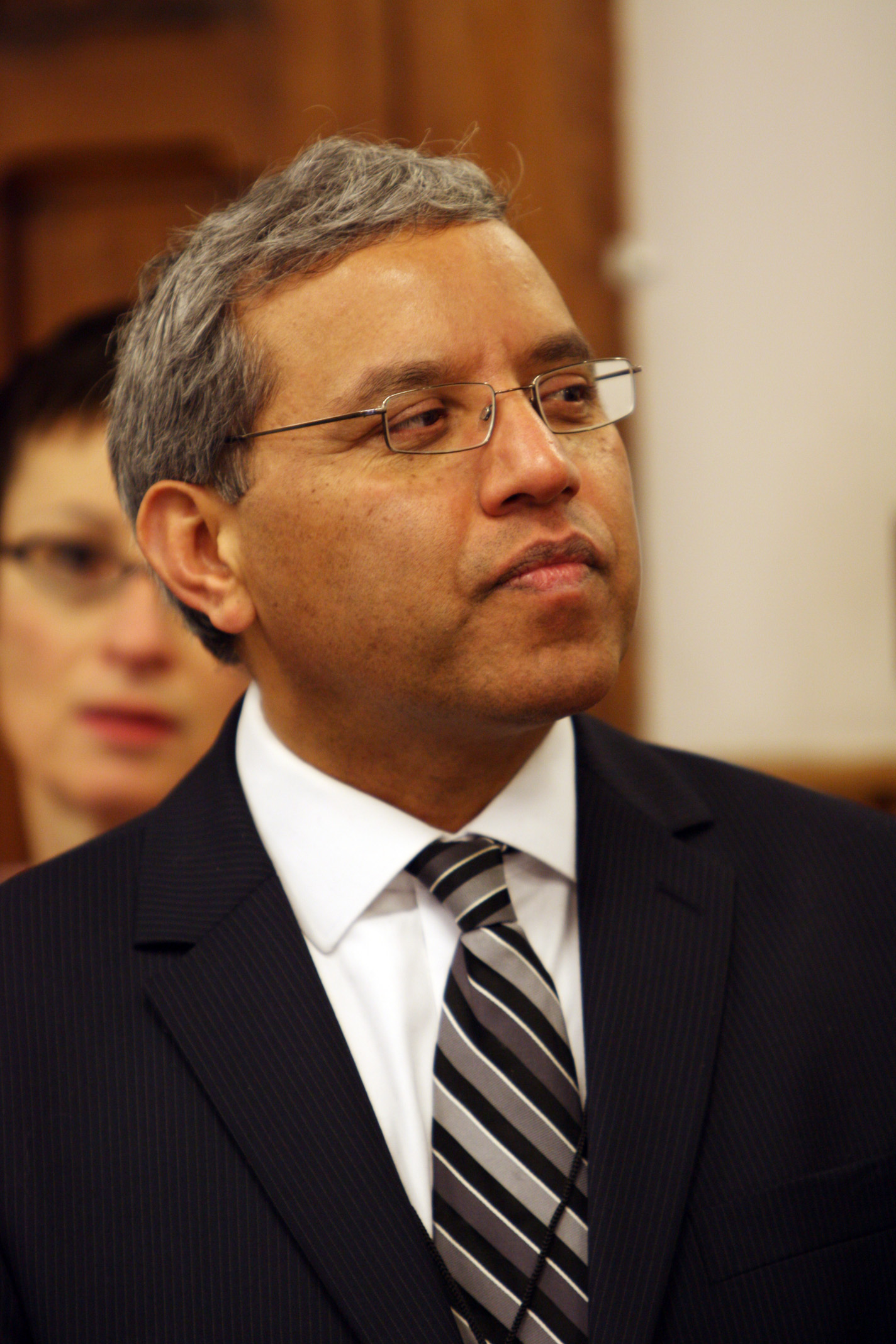
- Subedi in 2010

United Nations Special Rapporteur for Human Rights in Cambodia
- In office 2009–2015
- Preceded by: Yash Ghai
- Succeeded by: Rhona Smith

Personal details
- Born: Nepal
- Education: Tribhuvan University (LLB, MA); University of Hull (LLM, LLD); University of Oxford (DPhil, DCL)
- Occupation: jurist, legal scholar, diplomat
- Positions: Professor, Leeds (2004- ) Barrister, London (2007-); Member, Institut de Droit International (2011-)
- State Honours: Suprabal Gorkhadaxinbahu by the King of Nepal (1998); OBE by HM the Queen of the United Kingdom (2004); Prasidhha Prabal Jana Sewa Shree by the President of Nepal (2022)

Surya Prasad Subedi is a British-Nepalese jurist. He is Professor of International Law at the University of Leeds, a member of the Institut de Droit International, and a barrister in London. He also is a visiting professor on the international human rights law programme of the University of Oxford. He served as the United Nations special rapporteur for human rights in Cambodia for six years (2009-2015). He also served for five years, starting in 2010, on an advisory group on human rights to the British Foreign Secretary. In 2021, he was appointed legal procedural advisor to the World Conservation Congress of the International Union for Conservation of Nature held in Marseille, France. He has written a number of works on the theory and practice of international law and human rights and acted as a counsel in a number of cases before the international courts and tribunals, including the International Court of Justice. In 2022, he was appointed to the list of arbitrators under a post-Brexit free-trade treaty between the United Kingdom and the European Union - the Trade and Cooperation Agreement (TCA).

== Early life and education ==
Subedi was born in the village of Khodi in Nepal, in the foothills of the Himalayas, within the Annapurna mountain range. The medium of instruction in his primary school and lower secondary school was mostly Sanskrit, with some Nepali language instruction. His father, Pandit Hom Nath, was a teacher and his granduncle, Pandit Badri Nath, was the headmaster.

He began his higher education at Tribhuvan University, completing his LLB degree in 1981 and an MA in 1984.

In 1986, as a recipient of the British Council Scholarship (now known as the Chevening Scholarship), he moved to the United Kingdom to study for an LLM (awarded with Distinction in 1988) at the University of Hull. He received the Josephine Onoh Memorial Prize from the University of Hull as best LLM student of the year. Afterwards, Subedi continued his studies at the University of Oxford for a doctorate in law, which he received in 1993. His doctoral thesis won the Dasturzada Pavry Memorial Prize from the University of Oxford.

== Career ==
=== Law practice in Nepal ===
Subedi began his career in law as a public prosecutor in the Office of the Attorney-General of Nepal and, after promotion, proceeded to work for the Royal Commission on Judicial Reform and as Under-Secretary in the International Law Office of the Ministry of Law and Justice. He later served as advisor on international legal matters to King Birendra of Nepal and to the Ministry of Foreign Affairs.

=== British academia ===
Subedi began his academic career as a Lecturer in Law in 1993 at the University of Hull. After promotion, he became a Professor of Law in 1999 at Hull. He moved to the University of Leeds to become Professor of International Law.

Subedi was a co-founder and the founding chairperson of the Britain-Nepal Academic Council in 2000, serving in that capacity for ten years.

He was involved in the establishment of the Asian Society of International Law with its head office at the Faculty of Law of the National University of Singapore, and was chairman of the board of editors of the flagship publication of the society – the Asian Journal of International Law – published by Cambridge University Press. Prior to this, he was chief editor of the Asian Yearbook of International Law between 1999 and 2006 published by Martinus Nijhoff in The Hague. In addition, he is editor of a series of monographs on 'human rights and international law' published by Routledge (London/New York).

Subedi was elected to the Institut de Droit International in 2011 and made a Membre Titulaire in 2015. He was a member of the Executive Council of the International Law Association (ILA) between 2014 and 2017.

From 2015 to 2017, Subedi was a member of the Task Force on Investment Policy of the World Economic Forum in Davos and the International Centre for Trade and Sustainable Development in Geneva. As a result of the work of the Task Force, a report was published in 2016, which was then developed in the World Trade Organization (WTO) and led to the conclusion of negotiations on the text of an Investment Facilitation for Development Agreement in July 2023.

In 2020, Subedi was appointed as a member of the Expert Group on India-Nepal boundary issues. In early 2022, Subedi provided an opinion to the Government of Nepal concerning the U.S. Government’s proposed Millennium Challenge Corporation’s Nepal Compact. He also drafted an interpretive declaration which was used by the Government to ease the process of ratification.

In 2025, Subedi spoke before the Oxford Union, where he argued that the spread of liberal democracy to the Global South has resulted in the widespread advancement and protection of fundamental human rights, notwithstanding the shortcomings in their implementation and enforcement.

He has received a three-year Major Research Fellowship from the Leverhulme Trust to support his project examining the contribution of the Global South to the development of human rights.

He has taught and published in international human rights law, international investment law, WTO law, the law of the sea and international environmental law. His publications include:

1. 'The Workings of Human Rights, Law, and Justice: A Journey from Nepal to Nobel Nominee' (Routledge, London/New York, 2022). Drawing on the personal experience of a leading international jurist, this book offers insights into the powers bearing on international law and policymaking, the dynamics of human rights negotiations with governments, and the effects of their outcomes on the lives of their citizens.
2. ‘Human Rights in Eastern Civilisations: Some Reflections of a Former UN Special Rapporteur for Human Rights’ (Edward Elgar Publishing, England, 2021). It analyses the values of Eastern civilisations and their contribution to the development of the UN human rights agenda.
3. ‘Unilateral Sanctions in International Law’ (Hart Publishing, Oxford, 2021). It explores whether there are any rules in international law applicable to unilateral sanctions and if so, what these rules are.
4. ‘The Effectiveness of the UN Human Rights System: Reform and the Judicialisation of Human Rights’ (Routledge, London/New York, 2017). It "creates a modern vision of the United Nations that could function better in a multipolar world to help secure a better mode of living for more people around the world".
5. ‘International Investment Law: Reconciling Policy and Principle’ (Hart Publishing, Oxford). First published in 2008, as of 2024, it was in its 5th edition. It includes a critical overview of the law of foreign investment and deals with the tension between the law of foreign investment and other competing principles of international law, including human rights and environmental protection.
6. 'Land and Maritime Zones of Peace in International Law' (1996), Oxford Monographs in International Series, Clarendon: Oxford University Press, Oxford. This book provides a comprehensive and scholarly treatment of the attempts made during the Cold War period both inside and outside of the UN to create ‘zones of peace’ in various parts of the world. It examines the creation and status of zones of peace in the light of state practice and the relevant principles of international law. Based on this examination, the book identifies, through an analysis of certain already extant and emerging rules of international law, situations under which both land and maritime zone of peace could be created.
7. 'International Watercourses Law for the 21st Century: The Case of the River Ganges Basin' (Ashgate Publishing, UK, 2005). It presents a comprehensive and comparative view of the law of international watercourses with special reference to the issues facing the Ganges River basin. It provides an analysis of the development of international watercourses law and outlines the essentials of the UN Convention on non-navigational uses of international watercourses. Focusing on relations between three riparian states of the Ganges River and the potential for cooperation among these states, this volume also examines the domestic legal regimes of the area and the political dimension to the issues of sharing, managing, and conserving the waters of the river.

=== International law practice ===
Subedi is a barrister practicing out of Three Stone Chambers in London. He is a member of Middle Temple, one of the Inns of Court in London. He has appeared before the Crown Court and the Court of Appeal in England. Subedi has been a member of the London Court of International Arbitration (LCIA) since 2014. In April 2021, the flagship magazine of the Bar Council of England published a feature article on Subedi.

Subedi has advised governments in different countries on international legal matters and acted as a counsel in several cases before international courts and tribunals, including the International Court of Justice and the International Centre for Settlement of Investment Disputes (ICSID). Cases in which Subedi acted as a counsel include:

- Axiata Investments (UK) Limited and Ncell Private Limited v. The Federal Democratic Republic of Nepal – Arbitration under the Rules of the International Centre for Settlement of Investment Disputes (ICSID Case No. ARB/19/15)
- Application of the International Convention on the Elimination of All Forms of Racial Discrimination (Qatar v. United Arab Emirates) before the International Court of Justice
- Appeal Relating to the Jurisdiction of the ICAO Council under Article 84 of the Convention on International Civil Aviation (Bahrain, Egypt, Saudi Arabia and United Arab Emirates v. Qatar) before the International Court of Justice
- Appeal Relating to the Jurisdiction of the ICAO Council under Article II, Section 2 of the 1944 International Air Services Transit Agreement (Bahrain, Egypt and United Arab Emirates v. Qatar) before the International Court of Justice

In 2004, he was appointed by the WTO to the Roster of Panelists of its Dispute Settlement System. In 2012, he was designated to serve on the Panels of Conciliators and of Arbitrators of ICSID. In 2024, he was nominated as a conciliator and arbitrator under the United Nations Convention on the Law of the Sea by Nepal.

=== United Nations Special Rapporteur ===
The United Nations Human Rights Council voted unanimously for Subedi to be the UN Special Rapporteur for human rights in Cambodia at the 10th Session of the Council in 2009. On his appointment, Subedi said: "The main task would be to cast an impartial expert eye on the overall human rights situation in Cambodia and offer constructive advice to the Government to address the problems that exist with regard to the overall situation in the country". When he commenced his human rights work in the county, the Cambodian Prime Minister Hun Sen, asked publicly Subedi to go back to his own country and sort out the political issues in the country rather than lecturing the Government of Cambodia on how to improve the situation of human rights. The Prime Minister had been irked by the reports of Subedi stating that the judiciary and electoral commission were not independent in the country. Subedi was on the verge of being declared a persona non-grata in Cambodia by the Government. However, Subedi received support for his UN work from the international community, including the US President Barack Obama and the European Parliament.

Subedi continued to argue that the Government of Cambodia should carry out political reforms in the country, stating that as long as Cambodia was a member of the UN it had an obligation to promote and protect human rights. Eventually, Prime Minister Hun Sen was persuaded to come around to working with Subedi. Subedi pointed out related violations of human rights. During his six years of service for the UN, he produced a number of reports on judicial, parliamentary, electoral and land reform in Cambodia. A number of his recommendations, including those relating to judicial and electoral reform, have been implemented by the Government of Cambodia.

=== Restoration of democracy in Nepal ===
In Nepal, Subedi served time in prison during the struggle for democracy and human rights. He later assisted the Prime Minister of Nepal and other political leaders in resolving a 10-year Maoist conflict and in writing a new democratic constitution. In March 2024, at a ceremony in Kathmandu, the Prime Minister of Nepal, Pushpa Kamal Dahal, acknowledged Subedi's contribution to the writing of the new Constitution of Nepal, as well as his assistance to the country on other international legal matters, including the Millennium Challenge Corporation's Nepal Compact.

== Honours ==
=== In Nepal ===
King Birendra decorated Subedi with the Suprabal Gorkhadaxinbahu in 1998. The President of Nepal, Bidya Devi Bhandari, awarded him another high-level state honour, the Prasiddha Prabal Jana Sewa Shree, on the occasion of the Constitution Day of Nepal in 2022.

=== In the United Kingdom ===
==== QC (now KC) ====
Subedi was appointed a Queen's Counsel (QC) (Hon) in 2017 in recognition of his contribution to the development of international law and to the advancement of human rights. Appointments as Queen's (or King's) Counsel honoris causa are made by royal prerogative. Traditionally, honorary Silk has been awarded to legal academics and to some lawyers in public service for achievements beyond their normal responsibilities. Subedi was the first Nepali made Queen's Counsel. A press release of the British Government of January 2017 stated that Subedi had made "an exceptional contribution over a sustained period at the international level to develop international law and to advance human rights".

==== OBE ====
Prior to this, he was given an OBE in 2004 for his services to international law. He was the first Nepali who was not a royal, politician or military person to be awarded an OBE. Speaking at the OBE investiture on 19 October 2004 in London, the British Foreign Secretary stated that Subedi had "made a highly distinguished contribution to our understanding of international law, and to its evolution" and his work in international law had "spanned almost every aspect of it – with a special focus on issues ... which make a real difference to people's lives".

=== Academic honours ===
Subedi was awarded the degree of Doctor of Civil Law (DCL) by the University of Oxford in 2019. The fundamental purpose of this higher doctorate of the University of Oxford is to recognize excellence in academic scholarship. The University of Hull awarded him the Doctor of Laws (LLD) honoris causa in 2020. He was elected an Honorary Member of Nepal Academy in 2021. He was elected an Honorary Fellow of Exeter College of Oxford University in 2023.

In 2025, Subedi was honoured by the publication of a Festschrift, The Incoherence of Human Rights in International Law, which seeks to recognise his "immeasurable lifetime achievement and contribution to international law and human rights scholarship and practice".

=== Prizes named for Subedi ===
The Royal Asiatic Society launched an annual prize named after Subedi in 2022. The 'Surya P. Subedi Prize' is to be awarded to a book or an article on Nepal in English published anywhere in the world in any one calendar year.

Both of his British alma maters - the University of Oxford and the University of Hull - have established prizes in his name. The Subedi Prize for the best doctoral thesis (DPhil) of the year in law was established at the University of Oxford in 2020. Likewise, the Wilberforce Institute for the Study of Slavery and Emancipation at the University of Hull established a global essay prize on modern slavery or the protection of human dignity in his name in 2022.

== Public service ==
In his youth, Subedi led the students' union at Tribhuvan University in Nepal, a pro-human rights and democracy activity which earned him a three-month prison stay. Later in life, when living in the UK, he was involved in the establishment of the Non-Resident Nepali Association (NRNA) in 2003, to unite the Nepali diaspora.

Subedi served as a Governor of Beverley Grammar School, in Beverley, East Yorkshire from 1998 to 2001.

Starting in 2007, Subedi was progressively Trustee, Deputy Chair and Joint Co-Chair of the Britain Nepal Medical Trust and one of its Patrons starting in 2019.

He was appointed as the Crown Representative by Queen Elizabeth II on the Governing Board of SOAS University of London, 2007-2012.

In 2024, he was elected a Council member of the Royal Asiatic Society.

== Personal life ==
Subedi is married, with a son and a daughter.

Subedi is an avid hill walker and rambler. He participated in a 100 kilometer walk to raise funds in the aftermath of the April 2015 earthquake in Nepal. He has walked all of the Hadrian's Wall Path, from the east coast to the west coast.

== Publications ==
=== Books ===
- The Workings of Human Rights, Law, and Justice: A Journey from Nepal to Nobel Nominee (Routledge, London/New York, 2022).
- Human Rights in Eastern Civilisations: Some Reflections of a Former UN Special Rapporteur for Human Rights (Edward Elgar Publishing, Cheltenham, 2021).
- Unilateral Sanctions in International Law (Hart Publishing, Oxford, 2021).
- The Effectiveness of the UN Human Rights System: Reform and the Judicialisation of Human Rights (Routledge Publishing, London/New York, 2017).
- International Investment Law: Reconciling Policy and Principle (Hart Publishing, Oxford, 1st edition 2008, 2nd edition 2012, 3rd edition 2016, 4th edition 2020, and 5th edition 2024.
- International Trade and Business Law (Hanoi Law University), Vietnam, 1st edition 2012 and 2nd edition 2018, edited as part of an EU-Vietnam Multilateral Trade Assistance Project (MUTRAP) III.
- Dynamics of Foreign Policy and Law: A Study of Indo-Nepal Relations (Oxford University Press, 2005).
- International Watercourses Law for the 21st Century: The Case of the River Ganges Basin (Ashgate Publishing, UK, 2005).
- Contemporary Issues in International Law: A Collection of the Josephine Onoh Memorial Lectures (edited with Professors David Freestone and Scott Davidson), Kluwer Law International, The Hague/London (2002).
- Land and Maritime Zones of Peace in International Law (1996), Oxford Monographs in International Series, Clarendon: Oxford University Press, Oxford. Awarded the SPTL Prize for Outstanding Legal Scholarship from the British Society of Legal Scholars in 1997.
- Land-Locked Nepal in International Law (1989), K. Gautam, Kathmandu, Nepal.
- Nepalese Administrative Law (Ratna Book Publishers, Kathmandu, First edition 1985, Second edition 1987 and Third edition 1989).

=== Journal articles ===
- 'A Cross-Cultural Understanding of Human Rights in International Legal Discourse', Vol. 48, No. 3 (August 2026), Human Rights Quarterly, pp. 500-512
- 'Interlinkages between human rights, climate action and due diligence obligations of states: Potential impact on business organizations', Vol. 55, No. 6 (2025), Environmental Policy and Law, pp. 184–191
- ‘The Influence of Power in the Development of International Law with Special Reference to the Rights of Land-locked States’, Nepal Journal of Legal Studies, Vol. III (1) (2022-2023), March 2023, pp. 21–34.
- ‘Human Rights from East-West Perspectives’, Counsel (the flagship journal of the Bar Council of England), July 2022, pp. 32–34.
- ‘Legal Lamination to Transboundary Movement of Plastic Pollutants’ (with A. Pandey), Environmental Policy and Law (IOS Press) (2022), Vol. 52, No.2, pp. 133–143.
- ‘The Status of Dalit Women in Nepal’ in Asian Yearbook of Human Rights and Humanitarian Law (Vol: VI), 2022, pp. 43–53.
- ‘Declaration on the Right to Development, 1986’ in the United Nations Audio Visual Library of International Law (January 2021)
- ‘Changing notions of sovereignty and governance of water in India: An analysis of the Inter-State Water Disputes Tribunal’ (with A. Pandey), 26 The Journal of Water Law (2020), pp. 167–181.
- ‘Responsibility to Protect and the International Military Intervention in Libya in International Law: What Went Wrong and What Lessons could be Learnt from It?’ (with H. Teimouri), 23 (1) Journal of Conflict & Security Law (Oxford University Press, March 2018), pp. 1–30.
- ‘Life as a UN Special Rapporteur: The Role of UN Special Rapporteurs in Developing International Law, the Impact of Their Work, and Some Reflections of the UN Special Rapporteur for Human Rights in Cambodia’, (20) Asian Yearbook of International Law (2018), pp. 12–52.
- ‘The Future of International Investment Regulation: Towards a World Investment Organisation?’ (with Nicolette Butler), 64 (1) Netherlands International Law Review (April 2017), pp. 43–72.
- ‘The Disputes in the South China Sea and the United Nations Convention on the Law of the Sea’, 14 (1) Soochow Law Journal (January 2017), pp. 15–41.
- ‘The UN Human Rights Special Rapporteurs and the Impact of their Work: Some Reflections of the UN Special Rapporteur for Cambodia’, 6 (1) Asian Journal of International Law (Cambridge University Press, January 2016), pp. 1–14.
- ‘The Universality of Human Rights and the UN Human Rights Agenda: The Impact of the Shift of Power to the East and the Resurgence of the BRICS’, 55 (2) Indian Journal of International Law (Springer, 2015), pp. 177–207.
- ‘China’s Approach to Human Rights and the UN Human Rights Agenda’, 14 (3) Chinese Journal of International Law (Oxford University Press, 2015), pp. 437–464.
- ‘India’s New Bilateral Investment Promotion and Protection Treaty with Nepal: A New Trend in State Practice’, 28 (2) ICSID Review: Foreign Investment Law Journal (Oxford University Press, Fall, 2013), pp. 384–404.
- ‘Land Rights in Countries in Transition: A Case Study of Human Rights Impact of Economic Land Concessions in Cambodia’, 17 Asian Yearbook of International Law (2011), pp. 1–46.
- ‘A shift in paradigm in international economic law: From State-centric principles to people-centric policies’, 10 (3) Manchester Journal of International Economic Law (2013), pp. 314–335.
- ‘The WTO, Tuna and Dolphins: Has the Environment Lost another Battle?’ (with James Watson), 31 Delhi Law Review (2012) pp. 21–43.
- ‘Problems and Prospects for the Commission on the Limits of the Continental Shelf in Dealing with Submissions by Coastal States in Relation to the Ocean Territory Beyond 200 Nautical Miles’, 26 International Journal of Marine and Coastal Law (Martinus Nijhoff Publishers, The Hague, 2011), pp. 413–431.
- ‘Protecting Human Rights through the Mechanism of UN Special Rapporteurs’, 33 Human Rights Quarterly (The Johns Hopkins University Press, 2011), pp. 201–228.
- ‘The Notion of Free Trade and the First Ten Years of the World Trade Organization: How Level is the “Level Playing Field”?’, 53 (2) Netherlands International Law Review (Autumn 2006), pp. 273-296.
- ‘The Challenge of Reconciling the Competing Principles within the Law of Foreign Investment with Special Reference to the Recent Trend in the Interpretation of the Term “Expropriation”, 40 (1) International Lawyer (American Bar Association’s International Law Section, Spring 2006), pp. 121–141.
- ‘The Legal Regime Concerning the Utilization of the Water Resources of the River Ganges Basin’, 46 German Yearbook of International Law (2004), pp. 452–493.
- ‘The Road from Doha: The Issues for the Development Round of the WTO and the Future of International Trade’, 52 (2) International and Comparative Law Quarterly (April 2003), pp. 425–446.
- ‘The Concept in Hinduism of “Just War”’, 8 (2) Journal of Conflict and Security Law (Oxford University Press, 2003), pp. 339-361.
- ‘The Himalayan Frontier Policy of British-India and the Significance of the 1923 Treaty of Friendship between Great Britain and Nepal’, 27 Journal of the Britain-Nepal Society (London, December 2003), pp. 35–39.
- ‘The UN Response to International Terrorism in the Aftermath of the Terrorist Attacks in America and the Problem of the Definition of Terrorism in International Law’, 4 (3) International Law FORUM du droit international: The Journal of the International Law Association (August 2002), pp. 158–168.
- ‘Regulation of Shared Water Resources in International Law: The Challenge of Balancing Competing Demands’, 15 (1 & 2) Nepal Law Review (Faculty of Law, Tribhuvan University, July 2002), pp. 1–14.
- ‘Incorporation of the Principle of Sustainable Development into the Development Policies of the Asian Countries’, 32 (2) Environmental Policy and Law (International Council of Environmental Law, Bonn, April 2002), pp. 85–90.
- ‘The UN Monterrey International Conference on Financing for Development’, 4 (2) International Law FORUM du droit international: The Journal of the International Law Association (May 2002), pp. 52–53.
- ‘Hydro-diplomacy in South Asia: The Conclusion of the Ganges and the Mahakali River Treaties’, 93 (4) American Journal of International Law (October 1999), pp. 631–640.
- ‘Balancing International Trade with Environmental Protection: International Legal Aspects of Eco-labels’, 25 (2) Brooklyn Journal of International Law (Fall 1999), pp. 373–405.
- ‘Are the Principles of Human Rights “Western” Ideas? An Analysis of the Claim of the “Asian” Concept of Human Rights from the Perspectives of Hinduism’, 30 (1) California Western International Law Journal (Fall 1999), pp. 45–69.
- ‘The Legal Competence of the International Community to Create “Safe Havens” in “Zones of Turmoil”’, 12 (1) Journal of Refugee Studies (Oxford University Press, March 1999), pp. 23-35.
- ‘Constitutional Accommodation of Ethnicity and National Identity in Nepal’, 6 (1 & 2) International Journal on Minority and Group Rights (Kluwer Law International, The Hague, 1999), pp. 121–147.
- ‘Problems and Prospects for the Treaty on the Creation of a Nuclear-Weapon-Free Zone in Southeast Asia’, 4 (1) International Journal of Peace Studies (January 1999), pp. 63–78.
- ‘Environmental Inputs into the Planning Process and Access to Justice’, 28 (2) Environmental Policy and Law (May 1998), pp. 96–103.
- ‘The United Nations and the Indian Ocean and the South Atlantic as Zones of Peace and Co-operation’, 13 Ocean Yearbook (Chicago University Press, 1998), pp. 366–384.
- ‘Protection of Women Against Domestic Violence: The Response of International Law’, 2 (6) European Human Rights Law Review (1997), pp. 587–606.
- ‘Transit Arrangements between Nepal and India: A Study in International Law’, 2 (1) Geopolitics and International Boundaries (Frank Cass, London, 1997), pp. 175–196.
- ‘When is a Treaty a Treaty in Law? An Analysis of the Views of the Supreme Court of Nepal on a Bilateral Water Agreement between Nepal and India’, 5 Asian Yearbook of International Law (1996), pp. 201–210.
- ‘The Common Foreign and Security Policy of the European Union and Neutrality: Towards Coexistence?’, 42 (3) Netherlands International Law Review (1995), pp. 399–412.
- ‘The Doctrine of Objective Regimes in International Law and the Competence of the UN Security Council to Impose Territorial or Peace Settlements on States’, 37 German Yearbook of International Law (1994), pp 162–205.
- ‘India-Nepal Security Relations and the 1950 Peace and Friendship Treaty: Time for New Perspectives’, 34 (3) Asian Survey (University of California Press, 1994), pp. 273–284.
- ‘Neutrality in a Changing World: European Neutral States and the European Community’, 42 (2) International and Comparative Law Quarterly (London, March 1993), pp. 238–268.
- ‘The Marine Fishery Rights of Land-locked States with Particular Reference to the EEZ’, 2 (4) International Journal of Marine and Coastal Law (London, (1987), pp. 227–239.
- `Human Rights during Public Emergencies’, Obiter Dicta (Hull University Law Students Journal, England), Vol. 3, No. 3, 1988, pp. 25–31.

=== Chapters in books ===
- ‘International Investment Law’ in Malcolm Evans (ed.), International Law (6th edition, Oxford: Oxford University Press, 2024), pp. 768–794.
- ‘Reconciling Public Interests with Private Interests in International Investment Arbitration and Securing Effective Remedy for Investment-Related Human Rights Violations’ in Mahdev Mohan and Chester Brown (ed.), The Asian Turn in Foreign Investment (Cambridge University Press, 2021), pp. 363–378.
- ‘Enhancing State Responsibility from Environmental Implications of the South China Sea Dispute’, (with Amrisha Pandey) in Richard Barnes and Ronán Long (ed.), Frontiers in International Environmental Law: Oceans and Climate Challenges: Essays in Honour of David Freestone (Martinus Nijhoff/Brill, 2021), pp. 339–367.
- ‘The Role of the Commission on the Outer Limits of the Continental Shelf in the Governance of the Seas and Oceans’, in David Attard et al. (eds.) The IMLI Treatise on Global Ocean Governance (vol.1: UN and Global Ocean Governance), Oxford: Oxford University Press 2018, pp. 87–102.
- ‘International Investment Law’ in Malcolm Evans (ed.), International Law (5th edition, Oxford: Oxford University Press, 2018, pp. 717–742.
- ‘The Art of Negotiating Investment Treaties and Investment Contracts in a Changing World of International Investment Law’, in Americo B. Zampetti (ed.), Legal Assistance to Make Foreign Investment work better for Sustainable Development in the Least Developed Countries (Occasional Policy Paper Series of the United Nations on the Least Developed Countries (No. 2, 2017, United Nations, New York), pp. 11–14.
- ‘An Innovative Solution to an Ambitious Project: Dispute Resolution in the 1982 Convention on the Law of the Sea’, in Charles C. Jalloh and Olufemi Elias (eds.), Shielding Humanity: Essays in International Law in Honour of Judge Abdul G. Koroma (Martinus Nijhoff/Brill, The Hague, 2015), pp. 163–186.
- ‘International Law Response to Land Grabbing in Asia’, in Connie Carter and Andrew Harding (eds.), Land Grabs in Asia: What Role for the Law? (Routledge, Abingdon, 2015), pp. 24–34.
- ‘Human Rights Experts in the United Nations: A Review of the Role of the United Nations Special Procedures’, in Monika Ambrus et al. (eds.), The Role of ‘Experts’ in International and European Decision-making Process (Cambridge University Press, 2014), pp. 241–262.
- ‘WTO Dispute Settlement Mechanism as a New Technique for Settling Disputes in International Law’, in Duncan French, Matthew Saul and Nigel D. White (eds.), International Law and Dispute Settlement: New Problems and Techniques (Hart Publishing, Oxford, 2010), pp. 173–190.
- ‘Reassessing and Redefining the Principle of Economic Sovereignty of States’, in Duncan French (ed.), Global Justice and Sustainable Development (Brill, The Hague, 2010), pp. 403–410.
- ‘Post-conflict Constitutional Settlement in Nepal and the Role of the United Nations’, in Morly Frishman and Sam Muller (eds.), The Dynamics of Constitutionalism in the Age of Globalisation (Hague Academic Press, The Hague, 2010), pp. 71–87.
- ‘The Challenges to the National Security of Nepal and the Role of International Law and Foreign Policy’, in Rajan Bhattarai and Geja S. Wagle (eds.), Emerging Security Challenges of Nepal (Nepal Institute for Policy Studies, Kathmandu, 2010), pp. 65–110.
- ‘Access to Environmental Justice in a Politically Unstable Environment: A Case Study of Nepal’, in Andrew Harding (ed.), Access to Environmental Justice: A Comparative Study (Brill/Martinus Nijhoff, 2007), pp. 157–176.
- ‘The Status of International Humanitarian Law in Nepal’ (with Hari Phuyal), in V.S. Mani (ed.), Handbook of International Humanitarian Law in South Asia (Oxford University Press, New Delhi, 2007), pp. 86–91.
- ‘The Challenges Ahead for the World Bank and the International Monetary Fund with Regard to the Human Rights Agenda’, in C. Raj Kumar and D.K. Srivastava (eds.), Human Rights and Development: Law, Policy and Governance (LexisNexis, Butterworths, Hong Kong/Singapore/Malaysia in association with City University of Hong Kong, 2006), pp. 177–188.
- ‘Property Rights of Women in Nepal’ (with Ila Sharma), in Diane Ryland (ed.), An Era of Human Rights: International Legal Essays in Honour of Professor Jo Carby-Hall (Barmarick Publications, Enholmes Hall, Patrington, East Yorkshire, 2006), pp. 447–457.
- ‘The War on Terror and U.N. Attempts to Adopt a Comprehensive Convention on International Terrorism’, in Paul Eden and Therese O’Donnell (eds.), September 11, 2001: A Turning Point in International and Domestic Law? (Transnational Publishers, Inc., New York, 2005), pp. 207–225.
- ‘The Challenge of Managing the "Second Agricultural Revolution" through International Law: Liberalization of Trade in Agriculture and Sustainable Development’, in Nico Schrijver and Friedl Weiss (eds.), International Law and Sustainable Development: Principles and Practice (Martinus Nijhoff, The Hague, 2004), pp. 161–184.
- ‘Multinational Corporations and Human Rights’, in Karin Arts and Paschal Miyho (eds.), Responding to the Human Rights Deficit (Kluwer Law International, 2003), pp. 171–184.
- ‘Resolution of International Water Disputes: Challenges for the 21st Century’, in International Bureau of the Permanent Court of Arbitration, Resolution of International Water Disputes (Volume 6 in the PCA Peace Palace Papers series, The Hague, Kluwer Law International, 2003), pp. 33–47.
- ‘Sustainable Development Perspectives in International Economic Law’, in Asif H. Qureshi (ed.), Perspectives in International Economic Law (Kluwer Law International Law, The Hague, 2002), pp. 261–276.
- ‘Foreign Investment and Sustainable Development’, in Friedl Weiss et al. (eds.), Towards International Economic Law with a Human Face (Kluwer Law International, The Hague, 1998), pp. 413–428.
- ‘The United Nations and the Trade and Transit Problems of Land-locked States’, in Martin Glassner (ed.), The United Nations at Work (Praeger: Greenwood Publishing, Inc., Westport, Connecticut, 1998), pp. 134–160.

=== Published reports ===
- 'The situation of human rights in Cambodia', Sixth Report (2014) (U.N. Doc. A/HRC/27/70);
- Fifth Report (2013) (U.N. Doc. A/HRC/24/36);
- Fourth Report (2012) (U.N. Doc. A/HRC/21/63);
- Third Report (2011) (U.N. Doc. A/HRC/18/46);
- Second Report (2010) (U.N. Doc. A/HRC/15/46);
- First Report (2009) (U.N. Doc. A/HRC/12/40);
- An additional report entitled 'A Human Rights Analysis of Economic and other Land Concessions in Cambodia' (2012) UN Doc. A/HRC/21/63/Add.1.

=== Other online publications ===
- ‘Nepal-Britain Treaty of Friendship of 1923: An International Legal Perspective’, a presentation at a seminar organised jointly by the Embassy of Nepal and the London School of Economics on 14 June 2023
- ‘Foreign Policy of Nepal: Past, Present and Future’, the Inaugural Yadu Nath Khanal Memorial Lecture organised by the Ministry of Foreign Affairs, Kathmandu, 7 June 2022
- 'Human Rights and Constitutionalism in Nepal’, a public lecture delivered at the London School of Economics, on 13 February 2019
