= All Nepal National Free Students Union (UML) =

Student wing of CPN (UML)

Coordinates: 27°42′21.9″N 85°19′0.9″E

- ANNFSU flag
- Abbreviation: ANNFSU (UML)
- Founded: 14 May 1965; 61 years ago
- Type: Student wing
- Headquarters: Kathmandu
- Chairman: Deepak Dhami
- General Secretary: Anjana Shiwakoti
- Parent organisation: CPN (UML)

The All Nepal National Free Students' Union (Nepali: अखिल नेपाल राष्ट्रिय स्वतन्त्र विद्यार्थी युनियन, abbreviated as अनेरास्ववियु) is a political student organization in Nepal. The ANNFSU was founded in 1965. The original ANNFSU was later divided along ideological lines, and there are several organizations that emerged from it. The main ANNFSU grouping today is politically tied to the CPN (UML). As well as declaring itself a legitimate and independent students' organization of all progressive, democratic and patriotic students of Nepal, the mainstream ANNFSU is currently a member of the World Federation of Democratic Youth.

== History ==
The organization was founded in 1965 and was associated with the pro-China trend of the Nepalese communist movement. ANNFSU did however remain as a united organization, in spite of various splits within the radical communists. The ANNFSU gained prominence as an activist movement in a period when large sections of the established communist movement remained in jail.

Freedom was obtained by the Nepali people in 1950 after the end of Rana rule, but this newfound freedom was once again curtailed after King Mahendra's Proclamation of December 15, 1960, which ended the multiparty system and prohibited all political parties. During this time the presence of the All Nepal Student Federation began to weaken as it was not able to organize against the autocratic Panchayat regime. To help undermine the regime and establish the rights of Nepali citizens and students, many young people believed it was necessary to form a national student union. After three years of organizing (1962-1965), the All Nepal National Free Students’ Union was officially founded on May 14, 1965. However, this name was introduced through the 2nd National Convention in 1968. It is popularly called ANNFSU, with some students simply referring to the organization as "Akhil" or all.

The unity prevalent among different castes, creeds, cultures, sexes, ethnicities and other geographical sectors reflects the diversity of Nepal as a country. ANNFSU envisions the preservation of diverse nationalities by recognizing the diverse makeup of the country. The ANNFSU also works to protect the sovereignty of the nation, which includes carrying out a campaign to stop the encroachment of Nepali land, the protection of rights of citizens, and the proper use of natural resources. It has been carrying out a student-based movement in regards to three major issues: Nationality, a People-oriented education system, and Livelihood. Saluting the blood that was shed by the former leaders for nationality and national sovereignty, ANNFSU supports the idea of progressive Nationality for the prosperity of the Nepalese and Nepali students.

In 1979 ANNFSU was split. One section would be known as ANNFSU (Fifth) (which was tied to the Communist Party of Nepal (Marxist-Leninist)) and the other grouping became known as ANNFSU (Sixth) (which was connected to the Communist Party of Nepal (Fourth Convention)). The former group is the current mainstream ANNFSU connected to CPN(UML). A section of ANNFSU, which was in favor to support of multi-party democracy instead of the Panchayat autocracy regime in Nepal, established Nepal Progressive Student Union and went into the people to convince them to cast their votes in favor of multi-party democracy in the referendum.

In 1992 a section of the student wing of the Communist Party of Nepal (Marxist), the Nepal Progressive Students' Union, merged with ANNFSU. As of 2023, Samik Badal is the President of the organization. . Naresh Rokaya is the General Secretary.

== Departments ==
These departments are formed as per the arrangement made by the constitution. Each department consists of a single department head, a single secretary, and 2 women up to 9 members. The department head leads the department, prepares a work plan, and presents that in the meeting of the secretariat or the central committees. They also recommend the name of the members during the formation of the departments. They also have the duty to call regular meetings and take the lead in the implementation of the work plan. The department head maintains the work evaluation report of the members and presents it to the secretariat meeting every four months interval.

- Promotion Department
- Organization Department
- Department of Sports and Extra-curricular Activities
- Health Department
- Department of Creative and Social Concerns
- State Department
- Training Department
- Women's Department
- Publishing Department
- FSU Operating Department
- Education Department
- Work Department
- Science, Technology and Research Department
- Law Department
- Economics Department
- Foreign Affairs Department

== See also ==
- Nepal Revolutionary Students Union (the student wing of the Nepal Workers' and Peasants' Party)
- All Nepal National Free Students Union (Unified) (the student wing of the Communist Party of Nepal (Unity Centre-Masal))
- Nepal Progressive Student Federation (the student wing of the Communist Party of Nepal (United Marxist))
- All Nepal National Free Students Union (Revolutionary) (the student wing of the Communist Party of Nepal (Maoist)
- All Nepal Students Union ANSU (the student wing of the Communist Party of Nepal

Pragyik vidyarthi parishad Nepal (A political students organization )
