= Geeta Devi Mal =

Nepalese politician

Honourable Geeta Devi Mal
- गीता देवी माल

Minister of State for Industry, Tourism Forest and Environment of Sudurpashchim Province
- In office 20 May 2023 – 5 March 2024
- Governor: Dev Raj Joshi
- Chief Minister: Kamal Bahadur Shah
- Preceded by: Prakash Rawal

Member of the Sudurpashchim Provincial Assembly
- Incumbent
- Assumed office 30 December 2022

Personal details
- Born: 1 June 1984 (age 42) Ajaymeru , Dadeldhura District, Nepal
- Party: Nepali Communist Party
- Other political affiliations: Nepal Communist Party; Communist Party of Nepal (Maoist Centre)
- Spouse: Man Singh Mal
- Parents: Dev Singh Bhat (father); Guma Devi Bhat (mother)
- Profession: Politician

Geeta Devi Mal (Nepali: गीता देवी माल; born 1 June 1984) is a Nepalese politician and currently serving as a member of the 2nd Sudurpashchim Provincial Assembly. In the 2022 Nepalese provincial election she was elected as a proportional representative from the Khas people category. She has previously served as the Minister of State for Industry, Tourism Forest and Environment of Sudurpashchim Province.

Mal has served as a parliamentary party chief whip of the CPN (Maoist Centre) in the Provincial Assembly.
