= Sushila Budhathoki =

Nepalese politician

- सुशीला बुढाथाेकी
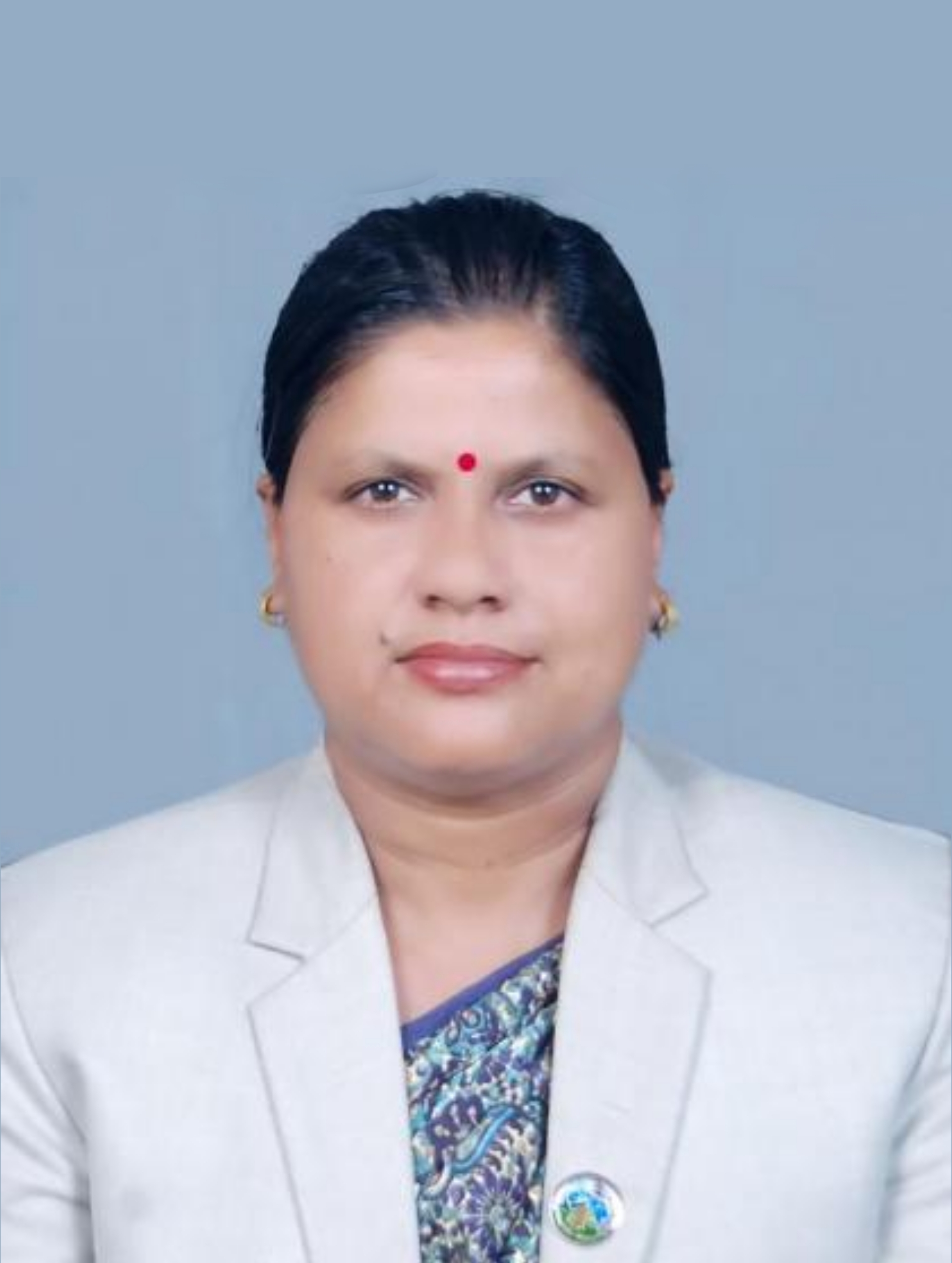
- Official portrait, 2018

Minister of State for Physical Infrastructure Development of Sudurpashchim Province
- In office 6 September 2022 – 11 January 2023
- Governor: Dev Raj Joshi
- Chief Minister: Trilochan Bhatta
- Preceded by: Kulbir Chaudhary
- Succeeded by: Nirmala Devi Saud

Member of the Sudurpashchim Provincial Assembly
- In office 21 January 2018 – September 2022

Personal details
- Party: Nepali Communist Party
- Other political affiliations: CPN (Unified Marxist–Leninist); CPN (Unified Socialist)

Sushila Budhathoki (Nepali: सुशीला बुढाथाेकी) is a Nepalese politician and who served as Minister of State for Physical Infrastructure Development in the Government of Sudurpashchim Province. She was also a member of the 1st Sudurpashchim Provincial Assembly. In the 2017 Nepalese provincial election, she was elected as a proportional representative from the Khas people category.

Budhathoki left the CPN (Unified Marxist–Leninist) to join the newly formed CPN (Unified Socialist) following the party split in 2021.
