= Tika Thapa =

Nepalese politician (born 1969)

Honourable Tika Thapa
- टिका थापा

Minister for Land Management, Agriculture and Cooperatives of Sudurpashchim Province
- In office 25 July 2024 – 5 August 2024
- Governor: Najir Miya
- Chief Minister: Dirgha Bahadur Sodari
- Preceded by: Himself; Position re-established
- Succeeded by: Bir Bahadur Thapa
- In office 30 April 2024 – 30 June 2024
- Governor: Najir Miya
- Chief Minister: Dirgha Bahadur Sodari
- Preceded by: Rameshwor Chaudhary
- Succeeded by: Himself; Position dissolved

Minister for Agriculture and Land Reform of Sudurpashchim Province
- In office 30 June 2024 – 25 July 2024
- Governor: Najir Miya
- Chief Minister: Dirgha Bahadur Sodari
- Preceded by: Position established
- Succeeded by: Position dissolved

Member of the Sudurpashchim Provincial Assembly
- Incumbent
- Assumed office 30 December 2022

Personal details
- Born: 13 July 1969 (age 57) Lamkichuha, Kailali District, Nepal
- Party: Nepali Communist Party
- Other political affiliations: Nagrik Unmukti Party
- Spouse: Ratan Thapa
- Parents: Dilliram Sharma (father); Kaushila Devi Sharma (mother)
- Profession: Politician

Tika Thapa (Nepali: टिका थापा) is a Nepalese politician and currently serving as a member of the 2nd Sudurpashchim Provincial Assembly since 30 December 2022. In the 2022 Nepalese provincial election she was elected as a proportional representative from the Khas people category.

Thapa served as the Chief Whip of the Nagrik Unmukti Party parliamentary party in the provincial assembly. She also served as Minister for Agriculture and Land Reform 30 June to 25 July 2024, and as Minister for Land Management, Agriculture and Cooperatives from 30 April to 30 June 2024 and again from 25 July to 28 July 2024.
