= Laxmi B.K. =

Nepalese female politician (born 1987)

Honourable Laxmi B.K.
- लक्ष्मी वि.क.

Minister for Internal Affairs and Law of Sudurpashchim Province
- In office 25 July 2024 – 5 August 2024
- Governor: Najir Miya
- Chief Minister: Dirgha Bahadur Sodari
- Preceded by: Hira Sarki
- Succeeded by: Hira Sarki

Minister for Education, Youth and Sports of Sudurpashchim Province
- In office 30 June 2024 – 25 July 2024
- Governor: Najir Miya
- Chief Minister: Dirgha Bahadur Sodari
- Preceded by: Position established
- Succeeded by: Position dissolved

Member of the Sudurpashchim Provincial Assembly
- Incumbent
- Assumed office 30 December 2022

Personal details
- Born: 14 December 1987 (age 38) Bhimdatta, Kanchanpur District, Nepal
- Party: Nepali Communist Party
- Other political affiliations: Communist Party of Nepal (Maoist Centre)
- Spouse: Diwani Ram Lohar
- Parents: Bir Bahadur B.K. (father); Chandra Devi B.K. (mother)
- Profession: Politician

Laxmi B.K. (Nepali: लक्ष्मी वि.क.) is a Nepalese politician and currently serving as a member of the 2nd Sudurpashchim Provincial Assembly since December 2022. In the 2022 Nepalese provincial election she was elected as a proportional representative from the Dalit people category. She has previously served as the Minister for Education, Youth and Sports from June to July 2024 and Minister for Internal Affairs and Law from July to August 2024.
