= Bhanu Bhakta Joshi =

Nepalese politician

- भानुभक्त जोशी

Minister of Federal Affairs and General Administration
- In office 6 March 2024 – 15 July 2024
- President: Ram Chandra Poudel
- Prime Minister: Pushpa Kamal Dahal
- Preceded by: Anita Devi Sah
- Succeeded by: Raj Kumar Gupta

Minister of Forests and Soil Conservation
- In office 13 February 2011 – 29 August 2011
- President: Ram Baran Yadav
- Prime Minister: Jhala Nath Khanal
- Preceded by: Deepak Bohara
- Succeeded by: Mohamad Wokil Musalman

Member of Parliament, Pratinidhi Sabha
- In office 22 December 2022 – 12 September 2025
- Preceded by: Bhairab Bahadur Singh
- Succeeded by: Ain Bahadur Mahar
- Constituency: Bajhang 1
- In office 14 December 1994 – 15 January 1999
- Preceded by: Arjun Jang Bahadur Singh
- Succeeded by: Arjun Jang Bahadur Singh
- Constituency: Bajhang 1

Member of the Constituent Assembly
- In office 28 May 2008 – 28 May 2012
- Preceded by: Arjun Jang Bahadur Singh (as Member of Parliament)
- Succeeded by: Man Prasad Khatri
- Constituency: Bajhang 1

Personal details
- Born: 25 July 1969 (age 56) Bajhang
- Party: Communist Party of Nepal (Unified Socialist)
- Other political affiliations: Nepal Communist Party

Bhanu Bhakta Joshi (Nepali: भानुभक्त जोशी) is a Nepalese politician, belonging to the CPN (Unified Socialist). In the 2008 Constituent Assembly election he was elected from the Bajhang-1 constituency, winning 13,955 votes and in 1994 Nepalese general election he was elected from Bajhang 1 (constituency), winning 12,603 votes. He also served as Minister for Forests and Soil Conservation in Jhalanath Khanal cabinet.

== Electoral history ==
2008 Constituent Assembly election

Bajhang-1

Party	Candidate	Votes
CPN (Unified Marxist–Leninist)	Bhanu Bhakta Joshi	13,955
CPN (Maoist)	Dev Raj Regmi	12,148
Nepali Congress	Arjun Jang Bahadur Singh	10,092
Others		2,248
Invalid votes		1,124
Result	CPN (UML) gain	
Source: Election Commission

1994 legislative elections

Bajhang-1

Party	Candidate	Votes
CPN (Unified Marxist–Leninist)	Bhanu Bhakta Joshi	12,603
Nepali Congress	Arjun Jang Bahadur Singh	6,640
Rastriya Prajatantra Party	Gagan Jang Bahadur Singh	2,906
Independent	Satya Ram Bhandari	2,607
Independent	Prem Bahadur Khati	729
Result	CPN (UML) gain	
