= Arjun Jang Bahadur Singh =

Nepali politician

Member of Parliament, Pratinidhi Sabha
- In office 28 April 2006 – 16 January 2008
- Preceded by: Himself (2002)
- Succeeded by: Bhanu Bhakta Joshi (as Member of the Constituent Assembly)
- Constituency: Bajhang 1
- In office 23 June 1999 – 22 May 2002
- Preceded by: Bhanu Bhakta Joshi
- Succeeded by: Himself (2006)
- Constituency: Bajhang 1
- In office 20 June 1991 – 11 July 1994
- Preceded by: Constituency created
- Succeeded by: Bhanu Bhakta Joshi
- Constituency: Bajhang 1

Personal details
- Party: Nepali Congress

Arjun Jang Bahadur Singh (Nepali: अर्जुन जंगबहादुर सिंह) is a Nepalese politician. He was elected to the Pratinidhi Sabha in the 1999 election on behalf of the Nepali Congress.

Singh was the NC candidate in the Bahjang-1 constituency for the 2008 Constituent Assembly election.
