= Indira Giri =

Nepalese female politician (born 1963)

Honourable Indira Giri
- इन्दीरा गिरी

Minister of State for Industry, Tourism, Forest and Environment of Sudurpashchim Province
- Incumbent
- Assumed office 21 August 2026
- Governor: Najir Miya
- Chief Minister: Khag Raj Bhatta
- Preceded by: Geeta Devi Mal

Minister of State for Land Management, Agriculture and Cooperatives of Sudurpashchim Province
- In office 9 March 2024 – 17 April 2024
- Governor: Najir Miya
- Chief Minister: Kamal Bahadur Shah
- Preceded by: Kailash Chaudhary

Member of the Sudurpashchim Provincial Assembly
- Incumbent
- Assumed office 30 December 2022

Personal details
- Born: 22 November 1963 (age 62) Dhangadi, Kailali District, Nepal
- Party: Nepali Communist Party
- Other political affiliations: Nagrik Unmukti Party
- Spouse: Ram Prasad Yogi
- Parents: Tul Bahadur Giri (father); Tara Maya Giri (mother)
- Profession: Politician

Indira Giri (Nepali: इन्दीरा गिरी) is a Nepalese politician and currently serving as the Minister of State for Industry, Tourism, Forest and Environment of Sudurpashchim Province. She is also serving as a member of the 2nd Sudurpashchim Provincial Assembly since 30 December 2022. In the 2022 Nepalese provincial election she was elected as a proportional representative from the Khas people category.

Giri has previously served as the Minister of State for Land Management, Agriculture and Cooperatives of Sudurpashchim Province.
