= Surendra Bahadur Pal =

Nepalese politician (born 1970)

Honourable Surendra Bahadur Pal
- सुरेन्द्र बहादुर पाल

Minister for Physical Infrastructure Development of Sudurpashchim Province
- In office 5 August 2024 – 15 July 2026
- Governor: Najir Miya
- Chief Minister: Kamal Bahadur Shah
- Preceded by: Kailash Chaudhary
- Succeeded by: Om Bikram Bhat

Minister for Economic Affairs of Sudurpashchim Province
- In office 10 June 2024 – 4 July 2024
- Governor: Najir Miya
- Chief Minister: Dirgha Bahadur Sodari
- Preceded by: Ghanshyam Chaudhary
- Succeeded by: Akkal Bahadur Rawal

Member of the Sudurpashchim Provincial Assembly
- Incumbent
- Assumed office 30 December 2022
- Preceded by: Prem Prakash Bhatta
- Constituency: Baitadi 1 (A)

Personal details
- Born: 21 November 1970 (age 55) Dilashaini, Baitadi District, Nepal
- Party: Communist Party of Nepal (Unified Marxist–Leninist)
- Spouse: Manisha Pal
- Parents: Bikram Bahadur Pal (father); Saraswati Pal (mother)
- Profession: Politician

Surendra Bahadur Pal (Nepali: सुरेन्द्र बहादुर पाल) is a Nepalese politician and currently serving as a member of the Sudurpashchim Provincial Assembly since 30 December 2022, having won the 2022 Nepalese provincial election from Baitadi 1 (A) constituency.

Pal has previously served as the Minister for Physical Infrastructure Development from August 2024 to July 2026 and as Minister for Economic Affairs from June to July 2024. Pal served as the parliamentary party chief whip of the CPN UML in the Provincial Assembly from June 2023 to June 2024 and again in August 2026.

== Electoral history ==
=== 2022 provincial elections ===
==== Baitadi 1 (A) ====
Candidate	Party	Votes	%
Surendra Bahadur Pal	CPN (UML)	12,831	33.64
Hari Mohan Bhandari	Independent	11,018	28.89
Bir Bahadur Bista	Nepali Congress	10,953	28.72
Narendra Bahadur Bista	CPN (Unified Socialist)	2,194	5.75
Rana Bahadur Bista	Rastriya Prajatantra Party	968	2.54
Others		178	0.47
Total		38,142	100.00
Valid votes		38,142	100.00
Invalid/blank votes		0	0.00
Total votes		38,142	100.00
Majority		1,813	
CPN (UML) gain			
