= Janaki Devi Kunwar =

Nepalese female politician (born 1988)

Honourable Janaki Devi Kunwar
- जानकी देवी कुँवर

Minister of State for Physical Infrastructure Development of Sudurpashchim Province
- Incumbent
- Assumed office 21 August 2026
- Governor: Najir Miya
- Chief Minister: Khag Raj Bhatta
- Preceded by: Nirmala Devi Saud

Member of the Sudurpashchim Provincial Assembly
- Incumbent
- Assumed office 30 December 2022

Personal details
- Born: 17 May 1988 (age 38) Chure, Kailali District, Nepal
- Party: Nepali Communist Party
- Other political affiliations: Communist Party of Nepal (Maoist Centre)
- Spouse: Bikram Singh Kunwar
- Parents: Chhabilal Poudel (father); Harikala Poudel (mother)
- Profession: Politician

Janaki Devi Kunwar (Nepali: जानकी देवी कुँवर) is a Nepalese politician and currently serving as the Minister of State for Physical Infrastructure Development of Sudurpashchim Province. She is also serving as a member of the 2nd Sudurpashchim Provincial Assembly since 30 December 2022. In the 2022 Nepalese provincial election she was elected as a proportional representative from the Khas people category.
