= Janaki Ayer Bam =

Nepalese female politician

- जानकी ऐर बम

Minister of State for Economic Affairs of Sudurpashchim Province
- Incumbent
- Assumed office 14 August 2026
- Governor: Najir Miya
- Chief Minister: Khag Raj Bhatta

Member of the Sudurpashchim Provincial Assembly
- Incumbent
- Assumed office 30 December 2023

Personal details
- Born: 28 November 1986 (age 39) Baitadi District, Nepal
- Party: Communist Party of Nepal (Unified Marxist–Leninist)

Janaki Ayer Bam (Nepali: जानकी ऐर बम) is a Nepalese politician and currently serving as the Minister of State for Economic Affairs of Sudurpashchim Province. She is also serving as a member of the 2nd Sudurpashchim Provincial Assembly. In the 2022 Nepalese provincial election she was elected as a proportional representative from the Khas people category.

Bam has served as a parliamentary party whip of the CPN (UML) in the Provincial Assembly.
