= Man Prasad Khatri =

Nepali politician

Member of the Constituent Assembly
- In office 21 January 2014 – 14 October 2017
- Preceded by: Bhanu Bhakta Joshi
- Succeeded by: Bhairab Bahadur Singh (as Member of Parliament)
- Constituency: Bajhang 1

Personal details
- Born: 27 December 1963 (age 62) Malumela–4, Bajhang
- Party: Communist Party of Nepal (Unified Marxist–Leninist)
- Parents: Abhiman Khatri; Dhauli Devi Khatri

Man Prasad Khatri (Nepali: मन प्रसाद खत्री) is a member of the 2nd Nepalese Constituent Assembly, representing the Communist Party of Nepal (Unified Marxist–Leninist). He won the Bajhang 1 seat in the 2nd CA assembly in 2013.
