= Kulbir Chaudhary =

Nepalese politician

- कुलवीर चौधरी

Minister of State for Physical Infrastructure Development of Sudurpashchim Province
- In office 8 April 2022 – 31 August 2022
- Governor: Dev Raj Joshi
- Chief Minister: Trilochan Bhatta
- Preceded by: Chun Kumari Chaudhari
- Succeeded by: Sushila Budhathoki

Member of the Sudurpashchim Provincial Assembly
- In office 21 January 2018 – 17 September 2022
- Preceded by: Constituency established
- Succeeded by: Diwan Singh Bista
- Constituency: Kanchanpur 1 (B)

Personal details
- Party: CPN (Unified Marxist–Leninist)
- Other political affiliations: CPN (Unified Marxist–Leninist); CPN (Unified Socialist)

Kulbir Chaudhary (Nepali: कुलवीर चौधरी) is a Nepalese politician who served as Minister of State for Physical Infrastructure Development in the Government of Sudurpashchim Province. He was a member of the Sudurpashchim Provincial Assembly, having won the 2017 Nepalese provincial election from Kanchanpur 1 (B) constituency.

Chaudhary later left the CPN (Unified Marxist–Leninist) to join the newly formed CPN (Unified Socialist) following the party split in 2021, but returned to the CPN (Unified Marxist–Leninist).

== Electoral history ==
=== 2017 provincial elections ===
==== Kanchanpur 1 (B) ====
Candidate	Party	Votes	%
Kulbir Chaudhary	CPN (UML)	16,158	53.14
Ram Lal Rana	Nepali Congress	10,223	33.62
Rajendra Prasad Joshi	Independent politician	1,640	5.39
Others		2,387	7.85
Total		30,408	100.00
Valid votes		30,408	95.41
Invalid/blank votes		1,462	4.59
Total votes		31,870	100.00
CPN (UML) gain			
Source: Election Commission
