= Millennium Challenge Corporation's Nepal Compact =

Millennium Challenge Corporation's Nepal Compact is a compact between the American aid agency Millennium Challenge Corporation (MCC) and the government of Nepal. Nepal was the first South Asian country to qualify for an MCC contract by passing 16 of the 20 policy indicators used by the MCC. The agreement was signed in Washington DC in September 2017; then Finance Minister of Nepal, Gyanendra Bahadur Karki, and then US deputy Secretary of State, John J. Sullivan, were present. This compact had begun developing on the request of Nepal in 2012 when Baburam Bhattarai was prime minister and Barsaman Pun was finance minister of Nepal.

Nepal's parliament ratified MCC compact on 27 February 2022 with a majority with certain interpretive declaration through understanding between all national parties.

In what would be the largest single grant Nepal has ever received, MCC would provide $500 million to be used for building transmission lines and for the maintenance of highways; Nepal would contribute $130 million to the projects.

== Political response ==
The compact became controversial in Nepal after then Deputy Assistant Secretary of State for South Asia David J. Ranz said that the MCC compact was a vital part of America's Indo-Pacific strategy. As the document says that it would supersede the country's laws in case of conflict, it needed to be ratified by the Nepalese parliament, according to the Nepal Treaty Act. Because lawmakers from within the major political parties were split on whether the compact was in Nepal's national interest, it was not brought for a vote in parliament for a long time.

The government eased the process by making interpretive declaration along with ratification from parliament. As a result, each national party voted for ratification and the compact was ratified on 27 February 2022.

=== Nepali Congress ===
The current ruling party of Nepal, the Nepali Congress gave a justification of 12 points on 15 February 2021 after its central working committee meeting. It included that MCC was not as advertised by some sources and leaders. The party also made a decision to launch an awareness campaign. It reported that MCC was a type of help (aid). Nepal would be helped by the construction of transmission lines and other infrastructure to be built as per the agreement. The party documents included the timeline of events from the starting of MCC to the release of the documents. It included the progress achieved during the governments led by Baburam Bhattarai, KP Sharma Oli, and the fourth term of Sher Bahadur Deuba in 2017. The party said it was necessary to remove the misconception in the general public that led to opposition to the aid. The party also requested political parties not to have a dual approach on MCC.

Many congress leaders spoke publicly on this matter including former party general secretary Shashanka Koirala, Prakash Sharan Mahat, Shekhar Koirala and Ram Chandra Poudel. Former party Vice president Bimalendra Nidhi said that having a dual nature, damaged the credibility of the country internationally. This was taken seriously by media who reported that Nepal's diplomacy and international relations were in continuous decline in recent years. Former finance minister Ram Sharan Mahat said that MCC was a game changer project so there would be no reason for a decline in support. Party general secretary, Gagan Thapa said that the party was adamant in its decision. He added that the party's perception wouldn't change whether it was in opposition or government. He said the party would be in support of rectifying MCC, breaking the illusion it was created for personal profit. Congress leader and former Defence minister Minendra Rijal said that the behaviour of Maoists had still not changed and they were thinking of making even Nepali Congress a red Congress.

=== CPN (UML) ===
The former ruling party and current chief opposition party of Nepal, the Communist Party of Nepal (Unified Marxist–Leninist) stood in support while in government.

Presently, its majority leaders are silent on the topic. Recently, it was reported that it would support in approving MCC from parliament if Nepali Congress would support removing the current speaker of parliament.

Both Nepali Congress and CPN (UML) reported that the people and party who brought MCC to Nepal are going against their own decision. Former Deputy prime minister and senior deputy chairman, Ishwar Pokhrel in his statement added that the speaker should condemn his decision to not let the MCC compact be tabled during the government led by KP Sharma Oli.

Former prime ministers and party president KP Sharma Oli condemned the works done by so-called krantikaris/revolutionaries, targeting the All Nepal National Independent Students' Union (Revolutionary), who threw stones at police and damaged the roads of Kathmandu. He alleged that their party chairman Prachanda stayed calm as a statue while sending cadres to protest. He asked them not to show a double standard. He suggested either leaving the government or to stop the destruction of public property. He questioned the government as to why the Maoists were still in government after the police were beaten.

=== CPN (Maoist Centre) ===
MCC compact entered Nepal during the premiership of Bhattarai while a committee was formed during second premiership of Dahal to rectify MCC. During premiership of Bhattarai, Barsaman Pun was the finance minister while Krishna Bahadur Mahara was the finance minister during premiership of Dahal. Maoist leaders Matrika Prasad Yadav, Bina Magar, Shakti Bahadur Basnet, Giriraj Mani Pokharel and Ram Bahadur Thapa were part of Second Oli cabinet which took MCC to parliament. At the time, they had given approval to table MCC.

Party president Pushpa Kamal Dahal "Prachanda" publicly maintained that the Millennium Challenge Corporation's (MCC) Nepal Compact could not be ratified without amending certain clauses. It was found that he was in favor of ratification as it was. MCC later released the letter dated September 29, 2021, in which Prachanda and Prime Minister of Nepal Sher Bahadur Deuba assured MCC that the compact would be ratified within four to five months. Major national newspapers criticized Prachanda's move, saying it would deteriorate Nepal's diplomatic strength and virtue.. Prachanda's doublespeak is actually well-chronicled in Nepal's contemporary history. How he utilized MCC for the gain of power has been recorded by Political Scientist Tika P. Dhakal in his 2025 book "Contours of Change in Nepal: Power, Politics and Paradox", with documented evidence of Dahal's ability to create his own sets of realities in the broad daylight.

They reported that it was dual nature of the party to both stay in government and protest at the same time for personal profit and vote swing. This move was highly criticized by people and medias.

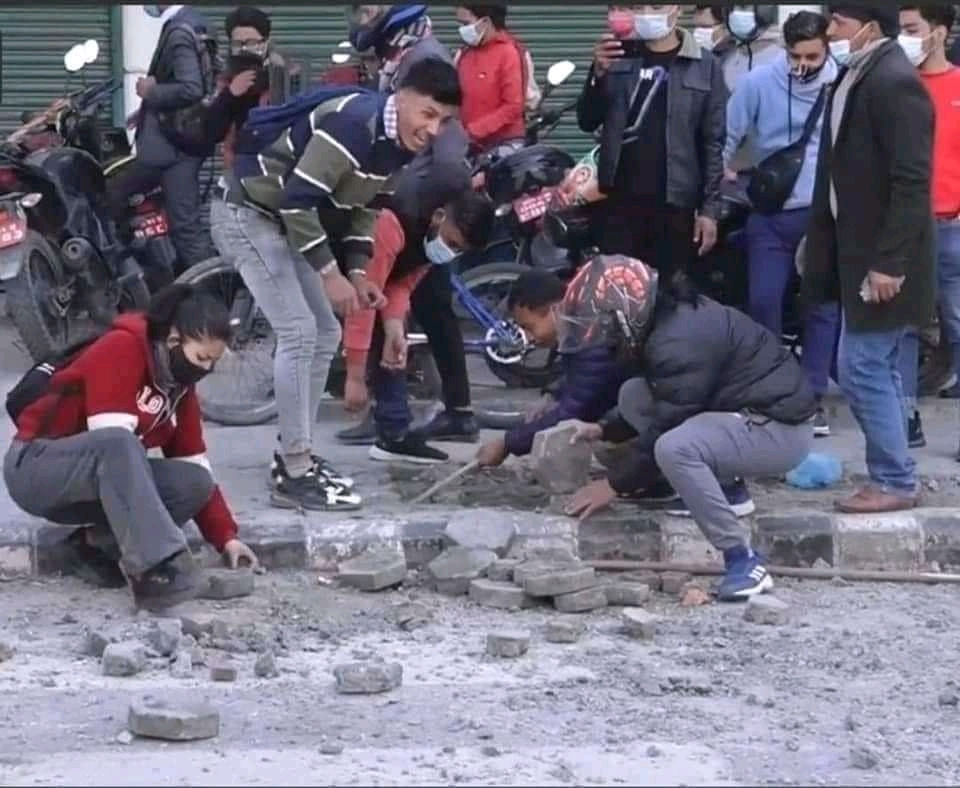
CPN (Maoist Centre) sister organisation, YCL and ANNISU (Revolutionary) leaders destroying public properties to attack police force

The party chairman had given approval to table MCC while several fellow politicians stood in opposition to the chairman's decision. They called for protests even on streets. Many police were attacked. Trees were broken, the blocks of footpath were removed to attack police as shown in picture. The branches of trees were broken. The Maoist cadets destroyed a boutique while the owner was saving police. Government had to pay for the loss. Leader of opposition and chairman of Communist Party of Nepal (Unified Marxist–Leninist), KP Sharma Oli condemned the decision of Maoists to stay in government while destroying public property at the same time. The Home Minister of Nepal, Bal Krishna Khan's and Prime minister asked the protesters to stay calm and not destroy public properties casing loss to the government and economy.

=== CPN (Unified Socialist) ===
One of the governing alliance members, the Communist Party of Nepal (Unified Socialist)'s chairman Madhav Kumar Nepal and senior leader Jhala Nath Khanal publicly denied the possibility of the compact getting tabled in parliament. If tabled, the party would vote in opposition.

The medias criticized the dual approach of the CPN (Maoist Centre) and the CPN (Unified Socialist) protesting in the streets while in government. They reported that the position of the party to both stay in government and protest at the same time was for personal profit and to swing voters.

=== People's Socialist Party, Nepal ===
The fifth largest party of Nepal and a junior ally in the current government, the People's Socialist Party, Nepal remains divided on this topic. A faction of the party stated that it had no opinion on the matter. It would support the CPN (Unified Socialist) and the CPN (Maoist Centre) without making its own approach.

The party's other faction, led by Baburam Bhattarai, stood in support of the project. Leader Bhattarai said that having a dual approach on the topic was wrong. He requested parties including the CPN (Maoist Centre) to stay out of the government rather than having a dual approach on the topic. This dual nature of CPN (Maoist Centre) and CPN (Unified Socialist) was also criticized by national medias.

=== Nepal Worker's and Peasant's Party ===
Though a small party with only one member in the house of representative Prem Suwal .This party always believed MCC to be a big threat to the nation. MCC agreement included various points to support their view such as by involving Indo Pacific Strategy. The agreement also states MCC to be superior to the Constitution of Nepal.

=== Loktantrik Samajwadi Party, Nepal ===
Though outside the government, the party made a decision to vote in support of getting the MCC passed. It reported that it would vote for acceptance if tabled in parliament. Senior leader Laxman Lal Karna said the party was clear to vote for MCC as it was a grant.

The party president Mahantha Thakur asked, "Why are the people against MCC silent on BRI?", aiming his comment at the communist parties in the ruling collision except for the Nepali Congress.

== Projects ==
MCC will provide $500 million, and Nepal will contribute $130 million for the programme which will complete two distinct projects in energy and transportation within five years. Nepal's contribution to the compact is the highest upfront contribution by a beneficiary country to an MCC programme. The Electricity Transmission Project intends to build a 318 km long 400KV transmission line with three high capacity sub-stations to more efficiently transfer power. The Hetauda-Damauli-Butwal transmission line will reach the Indian border, which will enable Nepal to export power from Nepalese hydropower projects which are expected to produce a surplus in the next decade. The Road Maintenance Project is intended to "improve the maintenance regime in Nepal". About 300 km of the East–West Highway will be improved and maintained, and MCC hopes to encourage and incentivise the Nepal government to spend more resources on periodic maintenance of key roads.

== Millennium Challenge Account–Nepal ==
Millennium Challenge Account–Nepal is the government agency in charge of managing the compact in Nepal. Its executive board is chaired by the Secretary of the Finance Ministry.

== History ==
MCC began developing the compact at the request of Nepal in 2012 when Baburam Bhattarai was prime minister and Barsaman Pun was finance minister of Nepal.

The compact was taken to parliament for ratification on 15 July 2019 when KP Sharma Oli was prime minister and Yuba Raj Khatiwada was finance minister of Nepal. MCC entered into effect on 30 August 2023.

On 2 February 2025, MCC provided an official notification to the Nepal government it would be immediately stopping payments for activities funded under the Nepal Compact, in order to comply with the 90-day freeze imposed by an executive order of US President Donald Trump on 20 January 2025. The program was resumed in July 2025.
