= Bhairab Bahadur Singh =

Nepalese politician

- भैरव बहादुर सिंह

Member of Parliament, Pratinidhi Sabha
- In office 4 March 2018 – 18 September 2022
- Preceded by: Man Prasad Khatri (as Member of the Constituent Assembly)
- Succeeded by: Bhanu Bhakta Joshi
- Constituency: Bajhang 1

Personal details
- Born: 25 April 1959 (age 66)
- Party: CPN (UML)

Bhairab Bahadur Singh is a Nepalese Politician and serving as the Member Of House Of Representatives (Nepal) elected from Bajhang-1, Province No. 7. He is member of the Nepal Communist Party.
