= Padam Bahadur Shahi =

Nepalese politician (born 1964)

- पदम बहादुर शाही

Member of the Sudurpashchim Provincial Assembly
- Incumbent
- Assumed office 30 December 2022
- Preceded by: Prakash Bahadur Shah
- Constituency: Bajura 1 (B)

Personal details
- Born: 29 March 1964 (age 62) Khaptad Chhededaha, Bajura District, Nepal
- Party: Nepali Congress
- Other political affiliations: Nepali Congress
- Spouse: Radhika Shahi
- Parents: Nar Bahadur Shahi (father); Chandra Devi Shahi (mother)
- Profession: Politician

Padam Bahadur Shahi (Nepali: पदम बहादुर शाही) is a Nepalese politician and currently serving as a member of the Sudurpashchim Provincial Assembly since 30 December 2022, having won the 2022 Nepalese provincial election from Bajura 1 (B) constituency.

== Electoral history ==
=== 2022 provincial elections ===
==== Bajura 1 (B) ====
| Candidate | Party | Votes | % |
|---|---|---|---|
| Padam Bahadur Shahi | Nepali Congress | 20,119 | 53.06 |
| Lal Bahadur Thapa | CPN (UML) | 17,521 | 46.21 |
| Others | | 277 | 0.73 |
| Total | | 37,917 | 100.00 |
| Majority | | 2,598 | |
| Nepali Congress hold | | | |
