= Prakash Bahadur Deuba =

Nepalese politician

- प्रकाश बहादुर देउवा

Minister for Physical Infrastructure Development of Sudurpashchim Province
- In office 10 February 2023 – 17 April 2024
- Governor: Dev Raj Joshi
- Chief Minister: Kamal Bahadur Shah
- Preceded by: Dirgha Bahadur Sodari
- Succeeded by: Kailash Chaudhary

Member of the Sudurpashchim Provincial Assembly
- Incumbent
- Assumed office 30 December 2022
- Preceded by: Dilli Raj Pant
- Constituency: Kailai 5 (B)

Personal details
- Born: Krishnapur, Kanchanpur, Sudurpashchim
- Party: Nepali Congress
- Education: Tribhuvan University, Kathmandu, Nepal

Prakash Bahadur Deuba (Nepali: प्रकाश बहादुर देउवा) is a Nepali politician and the current provincial assembly member from Kailali constituency No. 5 (B) and who had served as the Minister for Physical Infrastructure Development of Sudur Paschim Province He is member of Nepali Congress.

== Early life and career ==
Deuba was born on September 13, 1970, in Krishnapur, Kanchanpur of Far Western Province. Deuba was raised in a politically engaged household and his elder uncle, Sher Bahadur Deuba remains a former Nepali prime minister and a well-respected figure in the Far West. Deuba had a strong interest in politics as a result of his father's political activity, and while attending Tribhuvan University in Kathmandu, Nepal he started his political career on campus.
