= David Ranz =

American diplomat

Consulate General of the United States, Mumbai
- Incumbent
- Assumed office 27 August 2019
- President: Donald Trump; Joe Biden
- Preceded by: Edgard Kagan

Personal details
- Spouse: Taly Lind
- Education: Yale University, Princeton University

David J Ranz is a career member of the US Senior Foreign Service who has been serving as Consul General in Mumbai since August 2019. Ranz has served as Deputy Assistant Secretary of State for South Asia in the Bureau of South and Central Asian Affairs; and as Deputy Assistant Secretary of State for Pakistan. Ranz was also Director of the Office of Pakistan Affairs.

== Personal life ==
Ranz is married to Taly Lind, a Foreign Service Officer with the USAID, and has two children.

== Education ==
Ranz graduated summa cum laude from the Yale University and received his master's degree from the Princeton University.

== Career ==
Prior to his current appointment as Consul General in Mumbai, Ranz has served as

- Deputy Assistant Secretary of State for South Asia in the Bureau of South and Central Asian Affairs
- Deputy Assistant Secretary of State for Pakistan.
- Director of the Office of Pakistan Affairs.
- Acting Deputy Chief of Mission, U.S. Embassy in Cairo, Egypt
- Counselor for Political Affairs at the U.S. Embassy in Cairo, Egypt
- Spokesman and Counselor for Public Affairs, U.S. Embassy in Baghdad, Iraq

=== Deputy Assistant Secretary of State for South Asia ===
Ranz initiated various bilateral talks between Maldives and United States and committed $10 million support to the government of Maldives. He also welcomed renewed ties between India and Maldives.

=== Consul General of Mumbai ===
Local community hosted Namaste America special event to welcome Ranz. He signed MoU with the Ministry of Agriculture, Government of Maharashtra to promote collaboration between Maharashtra and United States of America. He was felicitated by the Ministry of Marathi language for building bilateral relations between US and Maharashtra through local Marathi language.

== Awards ==
He received several awards throughout his career.

- U.S. Department of State’s Herbert Salzman Award for International Economic Performance.
- U.S. Department of the Army Commander's Award for Public Service.
- Six State Department Superior Honor Awards
- Runner-up for James Clement Dunn Award for Excellence.
