= Santosh Kumari Sharma Thapa =

Nepalese female politician

- सन्तोष कुमारी शर्मा थापा

Minister for Social Development of Sudurpashchim Province
- Incumbent
- Assumed office 14 August 2026
- Governor: Najir Miya
- Chief Minister: Khag Raj Bhatta
- Preceded by: Vel Bahadur Rana Magar

Member of the Sudurpashchim Provincial Assembly
- Incumbent
- Assumed office 30 December 2023

Personal details
- Born: 11 February 1973 (age 53) Bajura District, Nepal
- Party: Communist Party of Nepal (Unified Marxist–Leninist)

Santosh Kumari Sharma Thapa (Nepali: सन्तोष कुमारी शर्मा थापा) is a Nepalese politician and currently serving as the Minister for Social Development of Sudurpashchim Province. She is also serving as a member of the 2nd Sudurpashchim Provincial Assembly. In the 2022 Nepalese provincial election she was elected as a proportional representative from the Khas people category.

Thapa has served as a parliamentary party deputy leader of the CPN (UML) in the Provincial Assembly and also a Minister in the Government of Sudurpashchim Province.
