= Governor of Sudurpashchim Province =

Nominal head of an Sudurpashchim Province, Nepal

- सुदूरपश्चिम प्रदेश प्रमुख
- Incumbent; Najir Miya since 15 March 2024
- Governor's Office; Government of Sudurpashchim Province
- Style: His Excellency
- Status: Head of state
- Reports to: President of Nepal
- Residence: Various
- Appointer: President of Nepal
- Term length: 5 years
- Inaugural holder: Mohan Raj Malla
- Formation: 2018 (8 years ago)
- Salary: 76,240 Nepalese rupees (NPR)

The Governor of Sudurpashchim Province is the nominal head of state of the Sudurpashchim Province of Nepal and a representative of the President of Nepal. The governor is appointed by the President for a term of five years. The governor's powers are mostly ceremonial and the executive powers of the governor are exercised by the chief minister of Sudurpashchim Province, who is the head of the executive of the state government of Sudurpashchim Province.

The incumbent, Najir Miya, is serving as the governor of Koshi Province since 15 March 2024.

== Selection process ==
Article 164 of the Constitution of Nepal states that:

1. being qualified for being a member of the Federal Parliament,
2. having completed the age of thirty five years, and
3. not being disqualified by any law.

== List of governors ==
No.	Name	Took office	Left office	Tenure
1	Mohan Raj Malla	19 January 2019	3 November 2019	288 days
2	Sharmila Kumari Panta	4 November 2019	3 May 2021	1 year, 180 days
3	Ganga Prasad Yadav	3 May 2021	9 November 2021	190 days
4	Dev Raj Joshi	11 November 2021	14 March 2024	2 years, 124 days
5	Najir Miya	15 March 2024	Incumbent	2 years, 176 days
