= Bajhang 1 =

Parliamentary constituency in Nepal

- Parliamentary constituency for the House of Representatives
- Bajhang 1 in Sudurpashchim Province; Protected areas in green

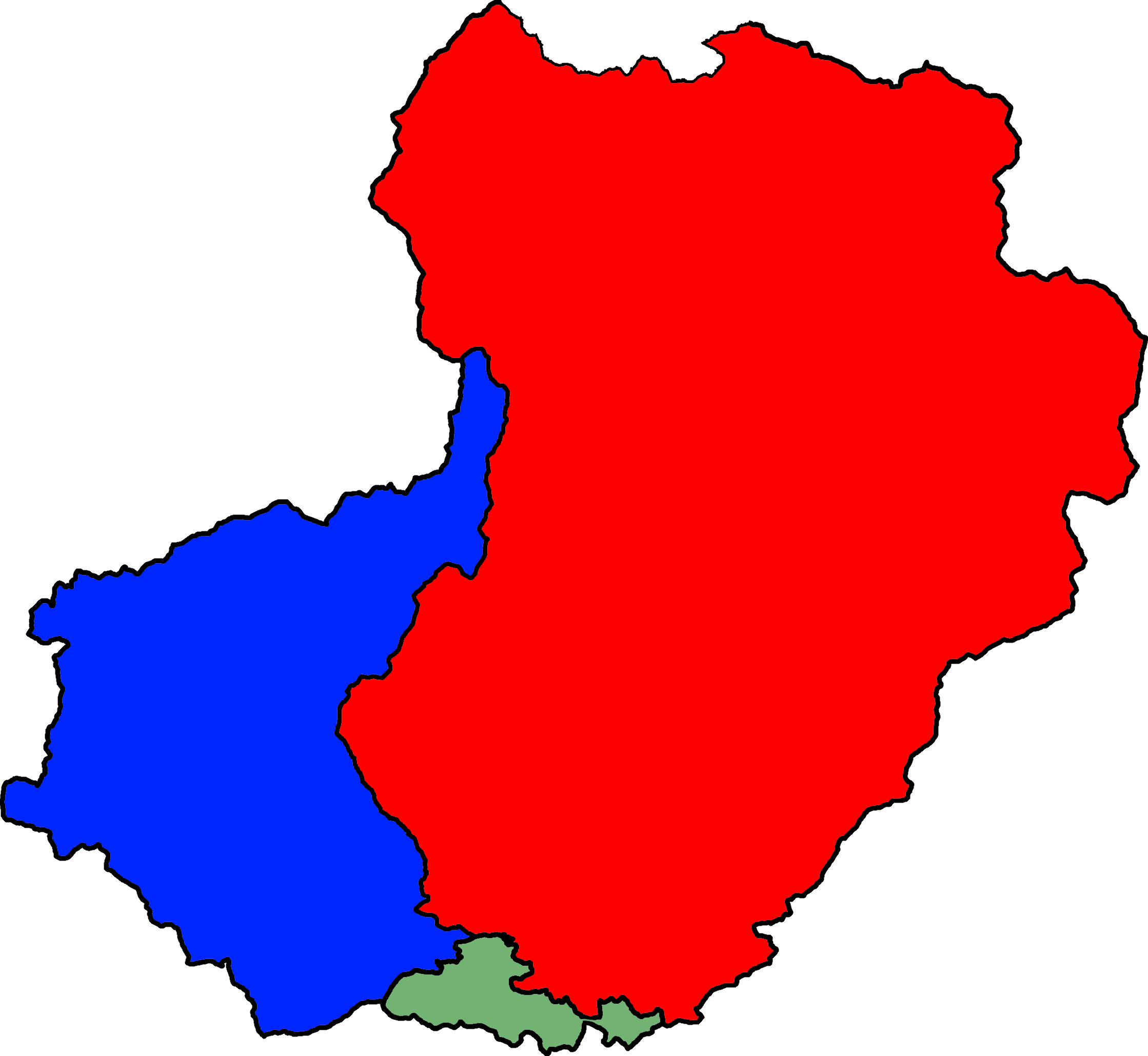
- Assembly segments Bajhang 1(A) (red) and Bajhang 1(B) (blue) within Bajhang District; Protected areas in green
- Province: Sudurpashchim Province
- District: Bajhang District
- Electorate: 104,275

Current constituency
- Created: 1991
- Number of members: 3
- Member of Parliament: Ain Bahadur Mahar, CPN(UML)
- Sudurpashchim MPA 1(A): Prithvi Bahadur Singh, Nepali Congress
- Sudurpashchim MPA 1(B): Bhim Bahadur Bhandari, Maoist Centre

Bajhang 1 is the parliamentary constituency of Bajhang District in Nepal. This constituency came into existence on the Constituency Delimitation Commission (CDC) report submitted on 31 August 2017.

== Incorporated areas ==
Bajhang 1 incorporates the entirety of Bajhang District.

== Assembly segments ==
It encompasses the following Sudurpashchim Provincial Assembly segment

- Bajhang 1(A)
- Bajhang 1(B)

== Members of Parliament ==
=== Parliament/Constituent Assembly ===
Election	Member	Party
1991	Arjun Jang Bahadur Singh	Nepali Congress
1994	Bhanu Bhakta Joshi	CPN (UML)
1999	Arjun Jang Bahadur Singh	Nepali Congress
2008	Bhanu Bhakta Joshi	CPN (UML)
2013	Man Prasad Khatri	CPN (UML)
2017	Bhairab Bahadur Singh	CPN (UML)
May 2018	Bhairab Bahadur Singh	Nepal Communist Party
March 2021	Bhairab Bahadur Singh	CPN (UML)
2022	Bhanu Bhakta Joshi	CPN (Unified Socialist)
2026	Ain Bahadur Mahar	CPN (UML)

=== Provincial Assembly ===
==== 1(A) ====
Election	Member	Party
2017	Arjun Bahadur Thapa	CPN (Unified Marxist-Leninist)
May 2018	Arjun Bahadur Thapa	Nepal Communist Party
March 2021	Arjun Bahadur Thapa	CPN (UML)
2022	Prithvi Bahadur Singh	Nepali Congress
2024 by-election	Daman Bahadur Bhandari	CPN (Unified Marxist–Leninist)

==== 1(B) ====
Election	Member	Party
2017	Devaki Malla (Thapa)	CPN (Maoist Centre)
May 2018	Devaki Malla (Thapa)	Nepal Communist Party
March 2021	Devaki Malla (Thapa)	CPN (Maoist Centre)
2022	Bhim Bahadur Bhandari	CPN (Maoist Centre)

== Election results ==
=== Election in the 2020s ===
==== 2026 general election ====
Candidate	Party	Votes	%
Ain Bahadur Mahar	CPN (UML)	18,543	33.82
Prakash Rasaili Snehi	Nepali Congress	16,304	29.73
Min Bahadur Kunwar	Nepali Communist Party	9,757	17.79
Shailesh Kumar Singh	Rastriya Swatantra Party	9,263	16.89
Bharat Malla	Communist Party of Nepal (Maoist)	520	0.95
Bishwa Prakash Jethara	Rastriya Prajatantra Party	405	0.74
Dal Bahadur Bohara	Nepal Workers Peasants Party	41	0.07
Total		54,833	100.00
Majority		2,239	
CPN (UML) gain			

==== 2024 by-election For Bajhang 1 (A) ====
Candidate	Party	Votes	%
Daman Bahadur Bhandari	CPN (UML)	11,613	39.09
Abhisek Bahadur Singha	Nepali Congress	11,346	38.20
Janak Bahadur Buda	CPN (Maoist Centre)	3,831	12.90
Others		2,915	9.81
Total		29,705	100.00
Majority		267	

Total Voters: 61748; Votes Cast:30337; Valid Votes: 29705; Invalid Votes: 632

==== 2022 general election ====
Candidate	Party	Votes	%
Bhanu Bhakta Joshi	CPN (Unified Socialist)	28,413	48.48
Ain Bahadur Mahar	CPN (UML)	27,412	46.77
Biswo Prakash Jethara	Rastriya Prajatantra Party	1,208	2.06
Others		1,580	2.70
Total		58,613	100.00
Majority		1,001	
CPN (Unified Socialist) gain			

==== 2022 provincial election ====
===== 1(A) =====
Candidate	Party	Votes	%
Prithvi Bahadur Singh	Nepali Congress	17,112	54.71
Aphilal Okheda	CPN (UML)	13,336	42.64
Others		830	2.65
Total		31,278	100.00
Majority		3,776	
Nepali Congress			

===== 1(B) =====
Candidate	Party	Votes	%
Bhim Bahadur Bhandari	CPN (Maoist Centre)	13,879	49.56
Lal Bahadur Rawal	CPN (UML)	11,337	40.48
Birendra Bahadur Malla	Rastriya Prajatantra Party	2,272	8.11
Others		515	1.84
Total		28,003	100.00
Majority		2,542	
CPN (Maoist Centre)			

=== Election in the 2010s ===
==== 2017 legislative elections ====
Party	Candidate	Votes
CPN (Unified Marxist–Leninist)	Bhairav Bahadur Singh	34,602
Nepali Congress	Prithvi Bahadur Singh	26,910
Others		1,820
Result	CPN (UML) hold	
Source: Election Commission

==== 2017 Nepalese provincial elections ====
===== 1(A) =====
Party	Candidate	Votes
CPN (Unified Marxist-Leninist)	Arjun Bahadur Thapa	17,868
Nepali Congress	Chandra Devi Joshi	13,197
Others		899
Invalid votes		1,181
Result	CPN (UML) gain	
Source: Election Commission

===== 1(B) =====
Party	Candidate	Votes
CPN (Maoist Centre)	Devaki Malla (Thapa)	16,743
Nepali Congress	Naresh Bahadur Singh	14,242
Others		851
Invalid votes		2,036
Result	Maoist Centre gain	
Source: Election Commission

==== 2013 Constituent Assembly election ====
Party	Candidate	Votes
CPN (Unified Marxist–Leninist)	Man Prasad Khatri	11,530
Nepali Congress	Arjun Jang Bahadur Singh	10,708
UCPN (Maoist)	Dev Raj Regmi	7,353
Others		1,930
Result	CPN (UML) hold	
Source: NepalNews

=== Election in the 2000s ===
==== 2008 Constituent Assembly election ====
Party	Candidate	Votes
CPN (Unified Marxist–Leninist)	Bhanu Bhakta Joshi	13,955
CPN (Maoist)	Dev Raj Regmi	12,148
Nepali Congress	Arjun Jang Bahadur Singh	10,092
Others		2,248
Invalid votes		1,124
Result	CPN (UML) gain	
Source: Election Commission

=== Election in the 1990s ===
==== 1999 legislative elections ====
Party	Candidate	Votes
Nepali Congress	Arjun Jang Bahadur Singh	14,209
CPN (Unified Marxist–Leninist)	Arjun Bahadur Thapa	13,827
CPN (Marxist–Leninist)	Keshav Raj Joshi	1,988
Rastriya Prajatantra Party	Gagan Jang Bahadur Singh	1,885
Rastriya Prajatantra Party (Chand)	Kummendra Rokaya	183
Invalid votes		601
Result	Congress gain	
Source: Election Commission

==== 1994 legislative elections ====
Party	Candidate	Votes
CPN (Unified Marxist–Leninist)	Bhanu Bhakta Joshi	12,603
Nepali Congress	Arjun Jang Bahadur Singh	6,640
Rastriya Prajatantra Party	Gagan Jang Bahadur Singh	2,906
Independent	Satya Ram Bhandari	2,607
Independent	Prem Bahadur Khati	729
Result	CPN (UML) gain	
Source: Election Commission

==== 1991 legislative elections ====
Party	Candidate	Votes
Nepali Congress	Arjun Jang Bahadur Singh	9,646
CPN (Unified Marxist–Leninist)		8,882
Result	Congress gain	

== See also ==
- List of parliamentary constituencies of Nepal
