= Chakra Bahadur Malla =

Nepalese politician

- चक्र बहादुर मल्ल

Minister for Economic Affairs of Sudurpashchim Province
- Incumbent
- Assumed office 14 August 2026
- Governor: Najir Miya
- Chief Minister: Khag Raj Bhatta

Member of the Sudurpashchim Provincial Assembly
- Incumbent
- Assumed office 30 December 2022
- Preceded by: Bharat Bahadur Khadka
- Constituency: Doti 1 (A)

Personal details
- Born: 2 May 1980 (age 46) Dhangadhi, Kanchanpur District, Nepal
- Party: Communist Party of Nepal (Unified Marxist–Leninist)

Chakra Bahadur Malla (Nepali: चक्र बहादुर मल्ल) is a Nepalese politician, belonging to the Communist Party of Nepal (Unified Marxist–Leninist) Party and currently serving as the Minister for Economic Affairs of Sudurpashchim Province. He also serves as a member of the Sudurpashchim Provincial Assembly and was elected from Doti 1 (A) constituency. Malla has served as a parliamentary party chief whip of the CPN (UML) in the Provincial Assembly.

== Electoral history ==
=== 2022 provincial elections ===
==== Doti 1 (A) ====
Candidate	Party	Votes	%
Chakra Bahadur Malla	CPN (UML)	27,210	52.83
Narendra Bahadur Singh	Nepali Congress	23,004	44.66
Others		1,295	2.51
Total		51,509	100.00
Majority		4,206	
CPN (UML) hold			
