= Daman Bahadur Bhandari =

Nepalese politician

- दमन बहादुर भण्डारी

Minister for Land Management, Agriculture and Cooperatives of Sudurpashchim Province
- Incumbent
- Assumed office 14 August 2026
- Governor: Najir Miya
- Chief Minister: Khag Raj Bhatta

Member of the Sudurpashchim Provincial Assembly
- Incumbent
- Assumed office 9 May 2024
- Constituency: Bajhang 1 (A)

Personal details
- Born: 28 May 1967 (age 59) Chhabis Pathibhera, Bajhang District, Nepal
- Party: Communist Party of Nepal (Unified Marxist–Leninist)

Daman Bahadur Bhandari (Nepali: दमन बहादुर भण्डारी) is a Nepalese politician and currently serving as the Minister for Land Management, Agriculture and Cooperatives of Sudurpashchim Province. Bhandari is also a member of the 2nd Sudurpashchim Provincial Assembly. In the 2024 by-election, he won the election from Bajhang 1(A) (constituency).

== Electoral history ==
=== 2024 by-election For Bajhang 1 (A) ===
Candidate	Party	Votes	%
Daman Bahadur Bhandari	CPN (UML)	11,613	39.09
Abhisek Bahadur Singha	Nepali Congress	11,346	38.20
Janak Bahadur Buda	CPN (Maoist Centre)	3,831	12.90
Others		2,915	9.81
Total		29,705	100.00
Majority		267	

Total Voters: 61748; Votes Cast:30337; Valid Votes: 29705; Invalid Votes: 632
