= Om Bikram Bhat =

Nepalese politician

Honourable Om Bikram Bhat
- ओम विक्रम भाट

Minister for Physical Infrastructure Development of Sudurpashchim Province
- Incumbent
- Assumed office 21 August 2026
- Governor: Najir Miya
- Chief Minister: Khag Raj Bhatta
- Preceded by: Surendra Bahadur Pal
Ministerial offices
Minister for Social Development of Sudurpashchim Province
In office 25 July 2024 – 5 August 2024
Governor	Najir Miya
Chief Minister	Dirgha Bahadur Sodari
Preceded by	Himself; Position re-established
Succeeded by	Megh Raj Khadka
In office 10 June 2024 – 30 June 2024
Governor	Najir Miya
Chief Minister	Dirgha Bahadur Sodari
Preceded by	Laxman Kishor Chaudhary
Succeeded by	Himself; Position dissolved
Minister for Health, Women and Children of Sudurpashchim Province
In office 30 June 2024 – 25 July 2024
Governor	Najir Miya
Chief Minister	Dirgha Bahadur Sodari
Preceded by	Position established
Succeeded by	Position dissolved

Member of the Sudurpashchim Provincial Assembly
- Incumbent
- Assumed office 30 December 2022
- Preceded by: Mohan Dutta Joshi
- Constituency: Kanchanpur 2 (A)

Personal details
- Born: 23 April 1987 (age 39) Ajayameru, Dadeldhura District, Nepal
- Spouse: Dipika Bhatt
- Parents: Dambar Bahadur Bhat (father); Nanda Devi Bhat (mother)
- Profession: Politician

Om Bikram Bhat (Nepali: ओम विक्रम भाट) is a Nepalese politician and currently serving as the Minister for Physical Infrastructure Development of Sudurpashchim Province since 2026. Bhat is also serving as a member of the Sudurpashchim Provincial Assembly since 30 December 2022, having won the 2022 Nepalese provincial election from Kanchanpur 2 (A) constituency.

Bhat had previously served as Minister for Health, Women and Children from 30 June to 25 July 2024 and, on two separate occasions, as Minister for Social Development, from 10 to 30 June 2024 and again from 25 July to 5 August 2024.

== Electoral history ==
=== 2022 provincial elections ===
==== Kanchanpur 2 (A) ====
Candidate	Party	Votes	%
Om Bikram Bhat	CPN(Maoist Centre)	10,938	35.15
Bachan Bahadur Singh	CPN (UML)	10,465	33.63
Geeta Chaudhary	Nagrik Unmukti Party	5,153	16.56
Chandrakant Bhandari	Rastriya Prajatantra Party	3,058	9.83
others		1,508	4.85
Total		31,122	100.00
Majority		477	
CPN(Maoist Centre) hold			
