= All Nepal National Independent Students Union (Unified) =

ANNFSU (Unified) flag

The All Nepal National free Students Union (Unified) (Nepali: अनेरास्ववियु एकिकृत) is a students organisation in Nepal. It is the students wing of the Communist Party of Nepal (Unity Centre-Masal).

ANNFSU (Unified) was formed on September 25, 2002, through the merger of the All Nepal National Free Students Union (Sixth) (students wing of Communist Party of Nepal (Masal)) and All Nepal National Independent Students Union (2022) (students wing of Communist Party of Nepal (Unity Centre)). The founding of the ANNFSU (Unified) occurred in the period of unification of CPN (Unity Centre) and CPN (Masal).

The 16th National conference of ANNFSU (Unified) elected a 51-member center committee to lead the organisation. Jivan gautam is the president of ANNFSU (Unified) and Jagrit Raymajhi is the general secretary of the organisation.

ANNFSU (Unified) actively took part in the protests against the royal regime in Nepal.
