= All Nepal National Independent Students Union (Sixth) =

Nepal students union merger

ANNFSU (Sixth) flag

All Nepal National Free Students Union (Sixth) (Nepali: अखिल (छैठौं)) was a students organisation in Nepal. It is the students wing of the Communist Party of Nepal (Fourth Convention), later of the Communist Party of Nepal (Unity Centre). In 2002, ANNFSU (Sixth) merged with the All Nepal National Independent Students Union (2022) (the students wing of Communist Party of Nepal (Masal), which had split off from ANNFSU (Sixth) in 1983) and formed the All Nepal National Independent Students Union (United).
