= 2nd Sudurpashchim Provincial Assembly =

2022 provincial election in Nepal

←	1st Assembly

Overview
- Legislative body: Sudurpashchim Provincial Assembly
- Jurisdiction: Sudurpashchim Province, Nepal
- Meeting place: District Coordination Committee Hall, Dhangadhi, Kailali District
- Term: 2 January 2023 –
- Election: 2022 provincial elections

Provincial Assembly
- Members: 53
- Speaker: Bhim Bahadur Bhandari (NCP (Note: Elected from CPN (Maoist Centre)))
- Deputy Speaker: Koili Devi Chaudhary (CPN (UML))
- Leader of the House: Kamal Bahadur Shah (NC)
- Leader of the Opposition: Khag Raj Bhatta (NCP)
- Party control: Government (29): Congress: 18; CPN (UML): 11; Opposition (23): NCP: 22; RPP: 1; Vacant (1)

The second Sudurpashchim Provincial Assembly was elected by the 2022 provincial elections on 20 November 2022. 87 members were elected to the assembly, 52 of whom were elected through direct elections and 35 of whom were elected through the party list proportional representation system. The first session of the assembly commenced from 2 January 2023.

== Leaders ==
=== Officers ===
- Speaker of the Assembly: Hon. Bhim Bahadur Bhandari, CPN (Maoist Centre)
- Deputy Speaker of the Assembly: Koili Devi Chaudhary, CPN (UML)
- Leader of the House:
  - Hon. Rajendra Singh Rawal, CPN (UML) (until 9 February 2023)
  - Hon. Kamal Bahadur Shah, Nepali Congress (until 10 February 2023 – 4 April 2024; since 5 August 2024)
  - Hon. Dirgha Bahadur Sodari, CPN (Unified Socialist) (until 2 August 2024)
- Leader of the Opposition:
  - Hon. Kamal Bahadur Shah, Nepali Congress (until 12 January 2023 – 9 February 2023; 18 April 2024 – 2 August 2024)
  - Hon. Khagaraj Bhatta, CPN (Maoist Centre) (until 27 February 2023)
  - Hon. Rajendra Rawal Singh, CPN (UML) (until 4 April 2024)
  - Man Bahadur Dhami, CPN (Maoist Centre) (since 5 August 2024)

=== Parliamentary party ===
- Parliamentary party leader of Nepali Congress: Hon. Kamal Bahadur Shah
- Parliamentary party leader of CPN (Maoist Centre): Hon. Khagaraj Bhatta
- Parliamentary party leader of CPN (UML): Hon. Rajendra Singh Rawal
  - Deputy parliamentary party leader of CPN (UML): Hon. Santosh Kumar Sharma
- Parliamentary party leader of Nagrik Unmukti Party: Hon. Rameshwar Chaudhary
- Parliamentary party leader of CPN (Unified Socialist): Hon. Dirgha Bahadur Sodari
  - Deputy parliamentary party leader of CPN (Unified Socialist): Hon. Prakash Rawal

=== Whips ===
- Chief Whip of Nagrik Unmukti Party: Hon. Laxman Kishor Chaudhary
  - Whip of Nagrik Unmukti Party: Hon. Ghanashyam Chaudhary
- Chief Whip of CPN (Unified Socialist): Hon. Naresh Kumar Shahi
  - Whip of CPN (Unified Socialist): Hon. Maya Panta

== Composition ==

Party	Seats					
Party	After election			At present		
Party	FPTP	PR	Total	FPTP	PR	Total
NCP	—	—	—	16	6	22
Congress	12	7	19	11	7	18
CPN (UML)	3	7	10	4	7	11
RPP	0	1	1	0	1	1
Vacant	—	—	—	1	—	1
Former members
Maoist Centre	8	3	11	8	3	11
Nagrik Unmukti Party	5	2	7	5	2	7
Unified Socialist	3	1	4	3	1	4
Independent	1	—	1	—	—	—
Total	32	21	53	32	21	53

== Members ==
Nepali Communist Party (22)
Constituency/PR group	Member	Portfolio & Responsibilities
Bajhang 1 (B)	Bhim Bahadur Bhandari	Speaker of the assembly
Dadeldhura 1 (A)	Khagaraj Bhatta	Leader of the Opposition (since 9 February 2023); Parliamentary party leader; Cabinet minister (until 9 February 2023)
Achham 1 (B)	Jhapat Bahadur Saud	
Achham 2 (A)	Akkal Bahadur Rawal	
Doti 1 (B)	Shiva Singh Oli	
Kailali 5 (A)	Ramesh Singh Dhami	
Darchula 1 (B)	Man Bahadur Dhami	
Kanchanpur 2 (A)	Om Bikram Bhatt	
Khas Arya	Gita Devi Mal	
Khas Arya	Janaki Devi Kunwar	
Dalit	Laxmi Bishwakarma	
Kailali 2 (B)	Rameshwar Chaudhary (Note: Elected from Nagarik Unmukti Party)	
Kailali 1 (B)	Laxman Kishor Chaudhary	
Kailali 3 (A)	Ghanashyam Chaudhary	
Kailali 1 (A)	Kailash Chaudhary	
Kailali 3 (B)	Khushiram Dagarura Tharu	
Khas Arya	Tika Thapa	
Khas Arya	Indira Giri	
Kailali 4 (A)	Dirgha Bahadur Sodari (Note: Elected from CPN (Unified Socialist))	
Kanchanpur 3 (A)	Prakash Rawal	
Bajura 1 (A)	Naresh Kumar Shahi	
Khas Arya	Maya Panta	

Nepali Congress (18)
Constituency/PR group	Member	Portfolio & Responsibilities
Kailali 2 (A)	Kamal Bahadur Shah	Chief Minister (since 9 February 2023); Leader of the Opposition (until 9 February 2023); Parliamentary party leader
Bajura 1 (B)	Padam Bahadur Shahi	
Achham 1 (A)	Megh Raj Khadka	
Achham 2 (B)	Man Bahadur Rawal	
Kailali 4 (B)	Prakash Bahadur Bam	
Kailali 5 (B)	Prakash Bahadur Deuba	
Darchula 1 (A)	Bikram Singh Dhami	
Baitadi 1 (B)	Shivaraj Bhatta	
Kanchanpur 1 (B)	Devan Singh Bista	
Kanchanpur 2 (B)	Bahadur Singh Thapa	
Kanchanpur 3 (B)	Vel Bahadur Rana Magar	
Khas Arya	Madhu Devi Bharati	
Khas Arya	Saraswati Khadka	
Khas Arya	Janu Kumari Dani	
Khas Arya	Dammari Mahara	
Khas Arya	Tulsi Devkota	
Dalit	Lalita Sunar	
Tharu	Gita Kumari Chaudhary	
Former members
Bajhang 1 (A)	Prithvi Bahadur Singh	Died on 20 June 2023

CPN (UML) (11)
Constituency/PR group	Member	Portfolio & Responsibilities
Khas Arya	Rajendra Singh Rawal	Chief Minister (until 9 February 2023); Parliamentary party leader
Tharu	Koili Devi Chaudhary	Deputy Speaker of the assembly
Khas Arya	Santosh Kumar Sharma	Deputy parliamentary party leader; Cabinet minister (until 9 February 2023)
Doti 1 (A)	Chakra Bahadur Malla	
Baitadi 1 (A)	Surendra Bahadur Pal	
Bajhang 1 (A)	Daman Bahadur Bhandari	Elected in a by-election on 29 April 2024
Kanchanpur 1 (A)	Bir Bahadur Thapa	
Khas Arya	Dharmaraj Pathak	
Khas Arya	Janaki Airee	
Khas Arya, Backward area	Nirmala Devi Saud	
Dalit	Hira Sarki	

Rastriya Prajatantra Party (1)
Constituency/PR group	Member	Portfolio & Responsibilities
Khas Arya	Khem Devi Bista	

Independent (1)
Constituency/PR group	Member	Portfolio & Responsibilities
Dadeldhura 1 (B)	Tara Prasad Joshi	

=== Changes ===
Constituency/PR group	Incumbent				Replacement			
Constituency/PR group	Name	Party	Date vacated	Reason	Name	Party	Date elected	Change
Bajhang 1 (A)	Prithvi Bahadur Singh	Congress	20 June 2023	Death	Daman Bahadur Bhandari	CPN (UML)	29 April 2024	By-election
Dadeldhura 1 (B)	Tara Prasad Joshi	Independent	19 January 2026	Resigned to contest general election				
