= Jwala Kumari Sah =

Nepali politician

- ज्वाला कुमारी साह

Minister of Agriculture and Livestock Development of Nepal
- In office 6 March 2024 – 3 July 2024
- President: Ram Chandra Poudel
- Prime Minister: Pushpa Kamal Dahal
- Preceded by: Beduram Bhusal
- Succeeded by: Ram Nath Adhikari
- In office 26 December 2022 – 27 February 2023
- President: Bidya Devi Bhandari
- Prime Minister: Pushpa Kamal Dahal
- Preceded by: Mrigendra Kumar Singh Yadav
- Succeeded by: Beduram Bhusal
- In office 10 June 2021 – 22 June 2021
- President: Bidya Devi Bhandari
- Prime Minister: KP Sharma Oli
- Preceded by: Padma Kumari Aryal
- Succeeded by: Basanta Kumar Nemwang

Member of Parliament, Pratinidhi Sabha
- In office 24 December 2022 – 12 September 2025
- Preceded by: Rambabu Kumar Yadav
- Succeeded by: Arvind Sah
- Constituency: Bara 3

Personal details
- Born: 27 October 1981 (age 44) Bara District
- Party: CPN (UML)
- Other party: CPN (Maoist Centre)

Jwala Kumari Sah is a Nepalese politician, belonging to the CPN (UML) currently serving as a member of the 2nd Federal Parliament of Nepal. In the 2022 Nepalese general election, she was ekected from the Bara 3 (constituency).

Sah is also a former member of the Constituent Assembly from the Madhesh Province Provincial Assembly (2074 BS). She has served as the state minister of land reform in 2067 BS and minister of tourism in 2068 BS. In Oli's cabinet, she also served as the agriculture minister for 13 days.

In 2022, she became a minister in Third Dahal Cabinet.
