= Beduram Bhusal =

Nepali politician

- बेदु राम भुसाल

Minister of Agriculture and Livestock Development
- In office 31 March 2023 – 4 March 2024
- President: Ram Chandra Paudel
- Prime Minister: Pushpa Kamal Dahal
- Vice President: Ram Sahaya Yadav
- Preceded by: Jwala Kumari Sah

Deputy chairman of CPN (Unified Socialist)
- Incumbent
- Assumed office 19 March 2023
- President: Madhav Kumar Nepal
- Preceded by: Position created

Member of Rastriya Sabha
- Incumbent
- Assumed office 4 March 2020
- Prime Minister: Sher Bahadur Deuba

Personal details
- Party: CPN (Unified Socialist)

Beduram Bhusal (Nepali: बेदु राम भुसाल) is a Nepalese politician belonging to CPN (Unified Socialist). Bhusal who is former Minister for Agriculture and Livestock Development for is also the deputy chairman of the CPN (Unified Socialist) party.

He is also member of Rastriya Sabha and is serving as leader of parliamentary party in the house.

== See also ==
- CPN (Unified Socialist)
