= National Trust for Nature Conservation =

Nepalese organization

- राष्ट्रिय प्रकृति संरक्षण कोष
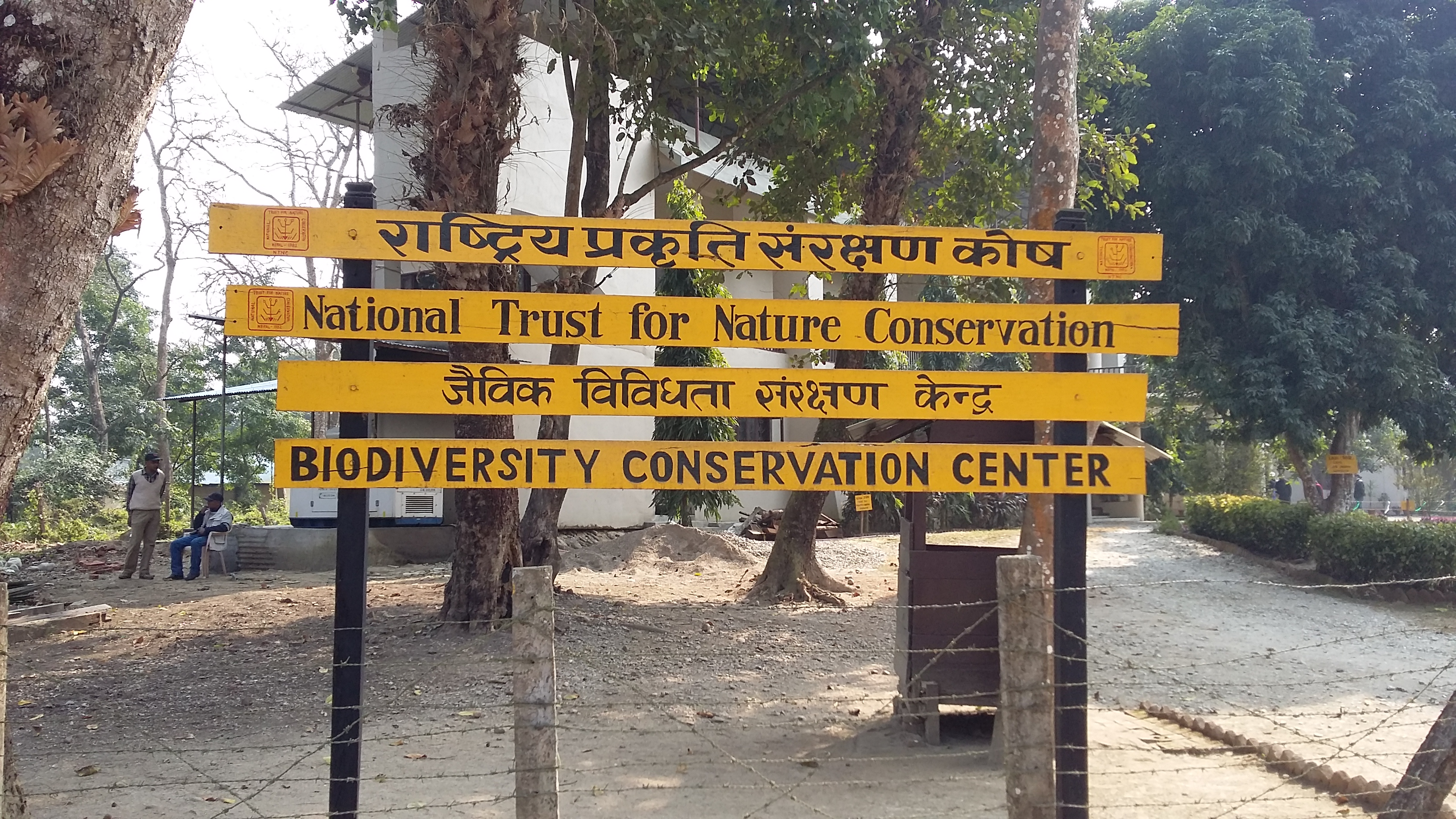
- National Trust for Nature Conservation
- Abbreviation: NTNC
- Formation: 1982
- Founder: King Birendra
- Type: NGO
- Purpose: Nature conservation
- Headquarters: Khumaltar, Lalitpur
- Patron: Balen Shah (Prime Minister)
- Chairperson: Geeta Chaudhary (Minister of Agriculture, Forests and Environment)
- Member-Secretary: Dr. Chiranjibi Prasad Pokharel
- Website: ntnc.org.np
- Formerly called: King Mahendra Trust for Nature Conservation

The National Trust for Nature Conservation (NTNC) (Nepali: राष्ट्रिय प्रकृति संरक्षण कोष), previously known as the King Mahendra Trust for Nature Conservation (Nepali: श्री ५ महेन्द्र प्रकृति संरक्षण कोष), is a Nepalese autonomous and not-for-profit organization working in the field of nature conservation.

The Trust works on nature and biodiversity conservation, clean energy and climate change, as well as cultural heritage protection, ecotourism, and sustainable development through active engagement of local communities.

== History ==
NTNC was established in 1982 as an autonomous, not-for-profit organization by a Legislative Act of Nepal. The founding member-secretary was Dr. Hemanta Raj Mishra. Mishra played a key role on bringing international donors to support the Trust. He was member secretary from 1982 to 1992.

== Activities ==
NTNC's mission is to conserve nature and natural resources in Nepal while meeting the needs of the people in sustainable way. Geographically, the Trust activities have spread from the sub-tropical plains of Chitwan, Bardia and Kanchanpur in the lowlands to the Annapurna and Manaslu region of the high Himalayas, including the trans-Himalayan region of Upper Mustang and Manang.

Currently, the projects of Trust are divided into three geographical areas—the lowland, the mid-hills (Kathmandu Valley) and the high mountains. The Trust's activities in the lowlands are based in and around the Koshi Tappu Wildlife Reserve, Chitwan National Park, the Bardia National Park, the Shuklaphanta National Park located in eastern, central and western Nepal, through the Koshi Conservation Center (KCC) in Sunsari, the Biodiversity Conservation Center (BCC) in Chitwan, the Bardia Conservation Program (BCP) in Bardia and the Shuklaphanta Conservation Program (SCP) in Kanchanpur. Similarly, the Annapurna Conservation Area Project (ACAP), the Manaslu Conservation Area Project (MCAP) and Gaurishankar Conservation Area Project (GCAP) are three protected areas managed by the Trust in the mountain region. The Central Zoo is the only project of the Trust in Kathmandu Valley.

The Trust's major thematic areas are species conservation, protected areas and ecosystems management, conservation economy, climate change, environmental education, and research and knowledge management. The Trust has also started work on urban environment conservation with the Bagmati River Conservation Project.

== Mission statement ==
"To promote, conserve and manage nature in all its diversity balancing human needs with the environment on a sustainable basis for posterity—ensuring maximum community participation with due cognizance of the linkages between economics, environment and ethics through a process in which people are both the principal actors and beneficiaries."

== Projects ==
NTNC works in several protected areas of Nepal, including:

- Annapurna Conservation Area Project (ACAP)
- Manaslu Conservation Area Project (MCAP)
- Gaurishankar Conservation Area Project (GCAP)
- Biodiversity Conservation Centre, Chitwan (BCC)
- Bardiya Conservation Program (BCP)
- Shuklaphanta Conservation Program (SCP)
- Koshi Conservation Center (KCC)
- Central Zoo

== See also ==
- Environmental issues in Nepal
