= Ministry of Agriculture, Forests and Environment =

Federal ministry of Nepal

Ministry of Agriculture, Forest and Environment
- कृषि, वन तथा पर्यावरण मन्त्रालय
- Emblem of Nepal

Ministry overview
- Formed: 14 May 2026; 3 months ago
- Preceding agencies: Ministry of Agriculture and Livestock Development; Ministry of Forests and Environment
- Jurisdiction: Government of Nepal
- Headquarters: Singha Durbar, Kathmandu
- Minister responsible: Geeta Chaudhary, Cabinet Minister
- Website: moald.gov.np

The Ministry of Agriculture, Forest and Environment is a federal ministry of Nepal responsible for the management of the country’s agricultural sector, forest resources, and environmental conservation efforts. It was established in its current form on 14 May 2026 following the merger of the former Ministry of Agriculture and Livestock Development and the Ministry of Forests and Environment.

As part of the Balendra Shah-led government's administrative restructuring reform, the ministry was formed by combining agricultural administration, forestry governance and environmental conservation responsibilities under a single federal ministry.

== List of ministers ==
This is a list of former ministers responsible for forest, environment and later agriculture, forest and environment affairs since the 2013 Nepalese Constituent Assembly election:

	Name	Party	Assumed office	Left office	Portfolio
Minister for Forest
1	Mahesh Acharya	Nepali Congress	25 February 2014		rowspan="2" |Minister for Forest
2	Agni Sapkota	Communist Party of Nepal (Maoist Centre)	19 October 2015		
Minister for Forests and Soil Conservation
3	Shankar Bhandari	Nepali Congress	26 August 2016	31 May 2017	rowspan="3" |Minister for Forests and Soil Conservation
4	Prime Minister Sher Bahadur Deuba	Nepali Congress	7 June 2017	11 September 2017	
5	Bikram Pandey	Rastriya Prajatantra Party	11 September 2017	15 February 2018	
Minister for Forests and Environment
6	Shakti Bahadur Basnet	Nepal Communist Party	16 March 2018	25 December 2020	Minister for Forests and Environment
7	Prem Ale	Nepal Communist Party	25 December 2020	4 June 2021	Minister for Forests and Environment
8	Narad Muni Rana	CPN UML	10 June 2021	22 June 2021	Minister for Forests and Environment
9	Krishna Gopal Shrestha	CPN UML	24 June 2021	12 July 2021	Minister for Forests and Environment
10	Ram Sahaya Yadav	People's Socialist Party, Nepal	8 October 2021	4 July 2022	Minister for Forests and Environment
11	Pradeep Yadav (Nepalese politician)	People's Socialist Party, Nepal	4 August 2022	14 October 2022	Minister for Forests and Environment
12	Birendra Prasad Mahato	People's Socialist Party, Nepal	24 May 2023	4 March 2024	Minister for Forests and Environment
13	Nawal Kishor Sah	People's Socialist Party (Nepal, 2024)	10 March 2024	8 July 2024	Minister for Forests and Environment
14	Aain Bahadur Shahi Thakuri	Nepali Congress	15 July 2024	9 September 2025	Minister for Forests and Environment
15	Sushila Karki	Independent	12 September 2025	12 December 2025	Prime Minister
16	Madhav Chaulagain	Independent	12 December 2025	27 March 2026	Minister for Forests and Environment
Minister for Agriculture, Forest and Environment
17	Geeta Chaudhary	Rastriya Swatantra Party	14 May 2026	Incumbent	Minister for Agriculture, Forest and Environment
