= Nepalu Chaudhary =

Nepalese politician

- नेपालु चौधरी

Chairperson of the Sudurpashchim Provincial Assembly Committee on Legislation and Provincial Affairs
- In office 8 September 2018 – 17 September 2022
- Preceded by: Office established
- Succeeded by: Diwan Singh Bista

Member of the Sudurpashchim Provincial Assembly
- In office 21 January 2018 – 17 September 022
- Preceded by: Constituency established
- Succeeded by: Ramesh Singh Dhami
- Constituency: Kailali 5 (A)

Personal details
- Party: Communist Party of Nepal (Unified Marxist–Leninist)
- Other political affiliations: Nepal Communist Party
- Profession: Politician

Nepalu Chaudhary (Nepali: नेपालु चौधरी) is a Nepalese politician who had served as the Chairperson of the Provincial Assembly Committee on Legislation and Provincial Affairs. Chaudhary served as a member of the Sudurpashchim Provincial Assembly, having won the 2017 Nepalese provincial election from Kailali 5 (A) constituency.

== Electoral history ==
=== 2017 provincial election ===
==== Kailali 5 (A) ====
Candidate	Party	Votes	%
Nepalu Chaudhary	CPN (UML)	17,367	52.54
Jiwan Rana	Nepali Congress	11,073	33.50
Jagannath Chaudhary	Rastriya Janata Party Nepal	2,815	8.52
Narayan Chaudhary	Bibeksheel Sajha Party	1,308	3.96
Others		489	1.48
Total		33,052	100.00
Valid votes		33,052	95.74
Invalid/blank votes		1,471	4.26
Total votes		34,523	100.00
Majority		6,294	
CPN (UML) gain			
Source: Election Commission
