= Ramesh Singh Dhami =

Nepalese politician (born 1983)

Honourable Ramesh Singh Dhami
- रमेश सिंह धामी

Minister for Industry, Tourism Forest and Environment of Sudurpashchim Province
- In office 20 May 2023 – 5 March 2024
- Governor: Dev Raj Joshi
- Chief Minister: Kamal Bahadur Shah
- Preceded by: Man Bahadur Dhami
- Succeeded by: Khushi Ram Dagaura Tharu

Member of the Sudurpashchim Provincial Assembly
- Incumbent
- Assumed office 30 December 2022
- Preceded by: Nepalu Chaudhary
- Constituency: Kailali 5 (A)

Personal details
- Born: 26 April 1983 (age 43) Mahakali Municipality, Darchula District, Nepal
- Party: Nepali Communist Party
- Other political affiliations: Nepal Communist Party; Communist Party of Nepal (Maoist Centre)
- Spouse: Nirmaya Thapa
- Parents: Dhukud Singh Dhami (father); Birma Devi Dhami (mother)
- Profession: Politician

Ramesh Singh Dhami (Nepali: रमेश सिंह धामी; born 26 April 1983) is a Nepalese politician and currently serving as a member of the Sudurpashchim Provincial Assembly, having won the 2022 Nepalese provincial election from Kailali 5 (A) constituency. Dhami has previously served as the Minister for Industry, Tourism Forest and Environment of Sudurpashchim Province.

== Electoral history ==
=== 2022 provincial elections ===
==== Kailali 5 (A) ====
| Candidate | Party | Votes | % |
|---|---|---|---|
| Ramesh Singh Dhami | CPN (Maoist Centre) | 9,387 | 26.74 |
| Nepalu Chaudhary | CPN (Unified Marxist–Leninist) | 9,262 | 26.39 |
| Shri Ram Chaudhary | Nagrik Unmukti Party | 7,864 | 22.41 |
| Pushkar Dutt Bhatta | Rastriya Prajatantra Party | 4,767 | 13.58 |
| Ramesh Singh Basnet | Independent | 3,819 | 10.88 |
| Total | | 35,099 | 100.00 |
| Valid votes | | 35,099 | 100.00 |
| Invalid/blank votes | | 0 | 0.00 |
| Total votes | | 35,099 | 100.00 |
| Majority | | 125 | |
| CPN (Maoist Centre) hold | | | |
