= Central Zoo =

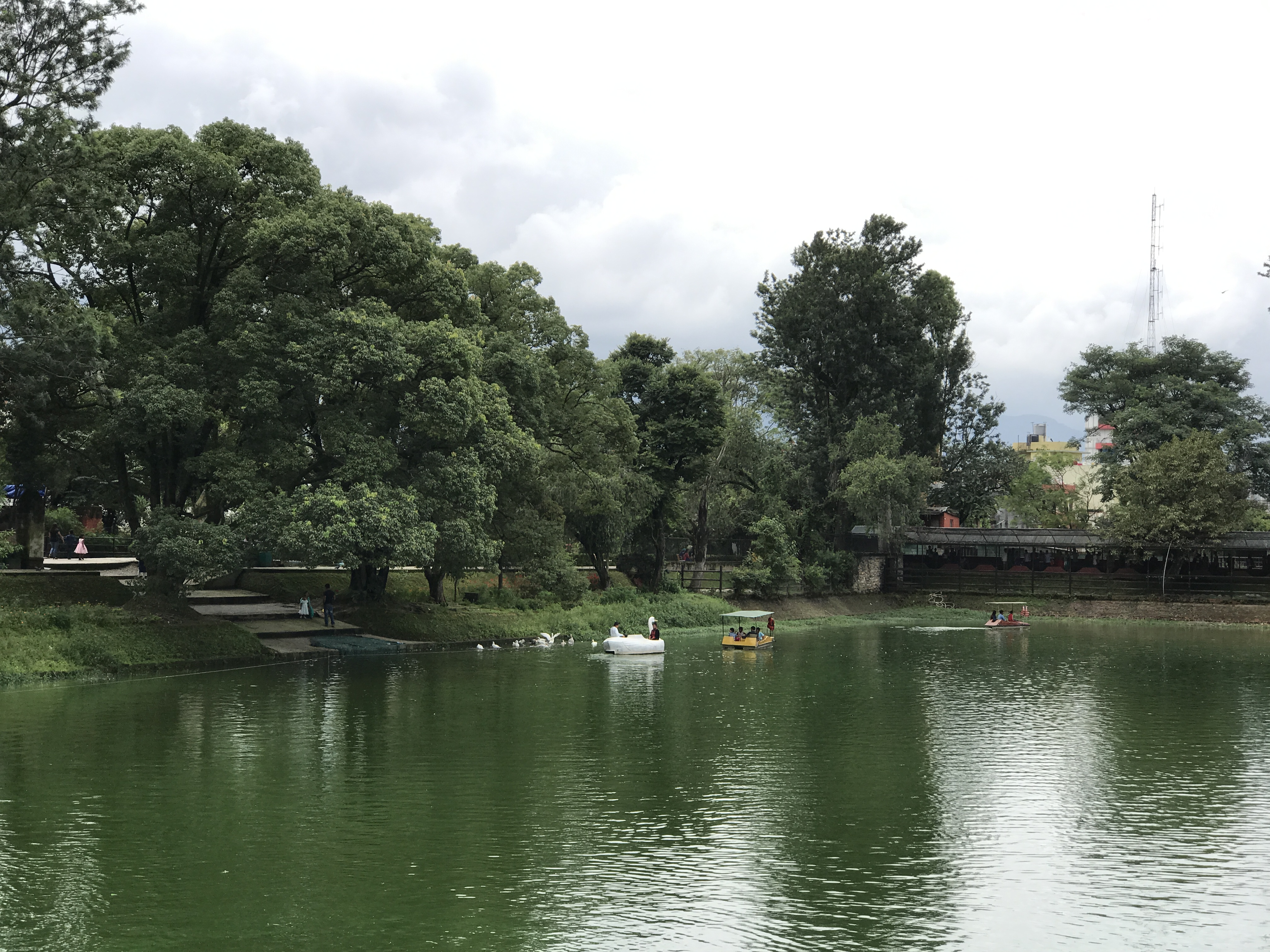
- Pond inside Central Zoo, Nepal
- Interactive map of Central Zoo
- 27.6731849°N 85.3109334°E
- Date opened: 1932 (private zoo); 1956 (opened to public)
- Location: Jawalakhel, Lalitpur, Nepal
- Land area: 6 ha
- No. of animals: 1292
- No. of species: 109
- Annual visitors: 1,000,000
- Website: Central Zoo NTNC

The Central Zoo (Nepali: सदर चिडियाखाना) is a 6-hectare (15-acre) zoo in Jawalakhel, Nepal. It is home to some 969 animals in 109 species, and is operated by the National Trust for Nature Conservation (NTNC). Although it was originally a private zoo, it was opened to the public in 1956.

During the Bhoto Jatra festival, celebrated near the zoo, the zoo may see upwards of 34,000 visitors in a single day after they come to see a historical jeweled vest at the culmination of the Rato Machchhindranath Jatra.

== History ==
The Central Zoo was established in 1932 by Rana Prime Minister Juddha Shumser as a private zoo; it came under government control in 1950. It was built under the engineering and project management of General Maheshwar Shamshere Rana (PM Juddha Shamshere's grandson) and his handpicked skilled and unskilled workforce. It was opened to the public in 1956, and in December 1995, the government handed over responsibility of the zoo to the National Trust for Nature Conservation. Although work is not complete, the NTNC has been upgrading the facilities so that animals can live in larger enclosures that simulate their natural environment. It is also working towards turning the zoo into a research and educational facility, as well as remaining a tourist attraction.

The central pond at the zoo is older than the zoo itself. It was built in the seventeenth century during the rule of King Siddhi Narsingh Malla, and at one time was the source of water for Patan.

== Animals ==
The zoo is home to about 870 animals in 109 species, including 15 of 38 endangered local species including Royal Bengal tigers and one-horned rhinoceros, as well as many animals from around the world including hippos, siamang, ostriches, chimpanzee, lemur, and many birds. It also has an aquarium for subtropical fish.

=== Mammals ===
Mammals at the zoo include:

Species	Scientific name	Photo{ (Note: The following photographs depict animals photographed inside the zoo)	Ref(s)
Proboscidea species
Asian elephant	Elephas maximus		
Perissodactyla species
Indian rhinoceros	Rhinoceros unicornis		
Carnivora species
Bengal tiger	Panthera tigris		
Snow leopard	Panthera uncia		
Black panther	Panthera pardus		
Clouded leopard	Neofelis nebulosa		
Indian leopard	Panthera pardus fusca		
Red panda	Ailurus fulgens		
Himalayan black bear	Ursus thibetanus		
Sloth bear	Melursus ursinus		
Striped hyena	Hyaena hyaena		
Golden jackal	Canis aureus		
Bengal Fox	Vulpes bengalensis		
Jungle cat	Felis chaus		
Leopard cat	Prionailurus bengalensis		
Common palm civet	Paradoxurus hermaphroditus		
Himalayan palm civet	Paguma larvata		
Large Indian civet	Viverra zibetha		
Small Indian civet	Viverricula indica		
Indian mongoose	Urva edwardsii		
Artiodactyl species
Wild water buffalo	Bubalus arnee		
Hippopotamus	Hippopotamus amphibius		
Himalayan blue sheep	Pseudois nayaur		
Himalayan goral	Naemorhedus goral		
Indian muntjac	Muntiacus vaginalis		
Indian hog deer	Axis porcinus		
Albino muntjac	Muntiacus vaginalis		
Spotted deer	Axis axis		
Swamp deer	Rucervus duvaucelii		
Sambar deer	Rusa unicolor		
Blackbuck	Antilope cervicapra		
Nilgai	Boselaphus tragocamelus		
Four-horned antelope	Tetracerus quadricornis		
Wild boar	Sus scrofa		
Primate species
Chimpanzee	Pan troglodytes		
Ring-tailed lemur	Lemur catta		
Siamang	Symphalangus syndactylus		
Mona monkey	Cercopithecus mona		
Patas monkey	Erythrocebus patas		
Vervet monkey	Chlorocebus pygerythrus		
Assam macaque	Macaca assamensis		
Common langur	Semnopithecus schistaceus		
Rhesus macaque	Macaca mulatta		
Rodent species
Albino crested porcupine	Hystrix cristata		
Crested porcupine	Hystrix cristata		
Indian palm squirrel	Funambulus palmarum		
Northern palm squirrel	Funambulus pennantii		

=== Reptiles ===
Reptiles at the zoo include:

Species	Scientific name	Ref(s)
Crocodilia species
Gharial	Gavialis gangeticus	
Chinese alligator	Alligator sinensis	
Mugger crocodile	Crocodylus palustris	
Squamata species
Bengal monitor	Varanus bengalensis	
Asian rock python	Python molurus	
Monocled cobra	Naja kaouthia	
Testudines species
Aldabra tortoise	Aldabrachelys gigantea	
Indian pond turtle	Melanochelys trijuga	
Indian roofed turtle	Pangshura tecta	
Tricarinate hill turtle	Melanochuelys tricarinata	
Yellow-headed temple turtle	Heosemys annandalii	
Red-eared slider	Trachemys scripta elegans	

=== Birds ===
Birds at the zoo include:

- Albino peacock
- Alexandrine parakeet
- Bar-headed goose
- Black kite
- Black-headed ibis
- Black-necked stork
- Blue rock pigeon
- Blue-and-yellow macaw
- Budgerigar
- Chestnut munia
- Chukar partridge
- Cockatiel
- Comb duck
- Common crane
- Common emerald dove
- Common kestrel
- Common ostrich
- Common quail
- Demoiselle crane
- Dusky eagle-owl
- Eastern barn owl
- Emu
- Eurasian eagle-owl
- Fantail pigeon
- Golden pheasant
- Great horned owl
- Great white pelican
- Grey heron
- Grey parrot
- Greylag goose
- Guinea fowl
- Himalayan monal
- Himalayan griffon vulture
- Indian silverbill
- Java sparrow
- Kalij pheasant
- Lady Amherst pheasant
- Lesser adjutant
- Lesser whistling duck
- Love bird
- Myna
- Oriental pied hornbill
- Peacock
- Rainbow lorikeet
- Red munia
- Red-breasted parakeet
- Reeve's pheasant
- Ring-necked pheasant
- Rose-ringed parakeet
- Ruddy shelduck
- Salmon-crested cockatoo
- Sarus crane
- Satyr tragopan
- Scarlet macaw
- Silver pheasant
- Speckled pigeon
- Spoonbill
- Spotted munia
- Sulphur crested cockatoo
- White cockatoo
- White stork
- White-naped crane
- Wood duck
- Zebra finch

=== Central Zoo animal overview ===
Animals in the Central Zoo of Nepal are in the following categories and numbers, as of April 2011:

Categories	Species	Number
Mammals	43	200
Reptiles	9	21
Fishes	14	232
Birds	80	500
Total	146	953

== Other facilities ==
The zoo includes a library, a children's small fun park, picnic areas and paddle boats on the lake. Fishing is allowed in the lake during some parts of the year.
