= Rambabu Kumar Yadav =

Nepalese politician

- राम बाबु कुमार यादव

Member of Parliament, Pratinidhi Sabha
- In office 4 March 2018 – 2022
- Preceded by: Farmullah Mansoor
- Constituency: Bara 3

Personal details
- Born: 29 May 1975 (age 50)
- Party: People's Socialist Party
- Other political affiliations: MJF-N; Federal Socialist Forum

Rambabu Kumar Yadav is a Nepalese politician, belonging to the People's Socialist Party, Nepal formerly serving as the member of the 1st Federal Parliament of Nepal. In the 2017 Nepalese general election he was elected from the Bara 3 constituency, securing 21336 (38.18%) votes.
