= Bara 3 =

Parliamentary constituency in Nepal

- Parliamentary constituency
- Bara 3 in Madhesh Province
- Province: Madhesh
- District: Bara District
- Major settlements: Kalaiya Submetroplitan City & Jitpursimra Submetropolitan City

Current constituency
- Created: 1991AD / 2048BS
- Number of members: 1 MP & 2 MPA
- Party: RSP = MP and CPN (UML) = MPA
- MP: माननीय अरविन्द साह
- 3 क: माननीय रबिन्द्र दास श्रेष्ठ
- 3 ख: माननीय मोहम्मद समिर

Bara 3 is one of four parliamentary constituencies of Bara District in Nepal. This constituency came into existence on the Constituency Delimitation Commission (CDC) report submitted on 31 August 2017 AD (Bhadra 15 2074 BS).

== Incorporated areas ==
Bara 3 incorporates wards 1-16 and 18-27 of Kalaiya Sub-metropolitan City, wards 5-7 of Pheta Rural Municipality, and wards 11-18 of Jitpur Simara Sub-metropolitan City.

Bara 3B incorporates wards 3, 5, 6, 9, 23, 8, 11, 7, 14, 18, 19, 25, 12, 13, 10, 20 of Kalaiya Submetro and 5 ,6, 7 of pheta gaupalika

== Assembly segments ==
It encompasses the following Province No. 2 Provincial Assembly segment

- Bara 3(A)
- Bara 3(B)

== Members of Parliament ==
=== Parliament/Constituent Assembly ===
Election	Member	Party
1991	Rishikesh Gautam	Nepali Congress
1994	Purushottam Paudel	CPN (Unified Marxist–Leninist)
1999	Rishikesh Gautam	Nepali Congress
2008	Pramod Prasad Gupta	Madhesi Jana Adhikar Forum, Nepal
2013	Farmullah Mansoor	Nepali Congress
2017	Rambabu Kumar Yadav	Janata Samjbadi Party, Nepal
2022	Jwala Kumari Sah	CPN (Unified Marxist–Leninist)
2026	Arvind Sah	Rastriya Swatantra Party

=== ३ क ===
Party	MPA	Elected Year
CPN Maoist	जवाला साह	2074BS
CPN UML	रवीन्द्र श्रेष्ठ	2079BS

=== ३ ख ===
Party	MPA	Year Elected
जसपा नेपाल	पारस प्रसाद साह	2074BS
नेकपा एमाले	मोहम्मद समीर	2079BS

== Election results ==
=== 2026 general election ===
Candidate	Party	Votes	%
Arvind Sah	Rastriya Swatantra Party	40,697	57.09
Farmullah Mansoor	Nepali Congress	10,052	14.10
Ram Babu Kumar Yadav	Janata Samjbadi Party, Nepal	6,884	9.66
Jwala Kumari Sah	CPN (UML)	5,271	7.39
Pramod Prasad Gupta	Janamat Party	3,899	5.47
Bharat Prasad Sah	Nepali Communist Party	1,751	2.46
Tirtha Bahadur Gurung	Ujyaalo Nepal Party	1,726	2.42
Rajendra Prasad Jaiswar	Rastriya Prajatantra Party	319	0.45
Mumataj Begam	Shram Sanskriti Party	142	0.20
Balakrishna Sharma	Rastriya Janamorcha	139	0.19
Samjhana Gole	Mongol National Organisation	127	0.18
Ram ekbal Raut	Nepal Majdoor Kisan Party	56	0.08
Sanjay Kumar Sahani	Jana Adhikar Party	52	0.07
Others		170	0.24
Total		71,285	100.00
Majority		30,645	
Rastriya Swatantra Party gain			

=== AD 2022/11/20 (BS 2079/08/04) ===
प्रतिनिधि सभा सदस्य बारा ३

Candidate	Party	Votes	%
Jwala Kumari Sah	CPN (UML)	20,251	31.83
Rambabu Kumar Yadav	People's Socialist Party, Nepal	17,279	27.16
Lalbabu Singh Bhuihar	Loktantrik Samajwadi Party, Nepal	11,964	18.81
Surendra Sharma	Rastriya Swatantra Party	3,579	5.63
Radhika Devi Sah	Janamat Party	3,331	5.24
Kalamuddin Ansari	Independent	1,878	2.95
Naresh Kumar Chaulagain	Ekikrit Shakti Nepal	1,075	1.69
Mohammad Shani Thakurai	Nepal Loktantrik Party	1,044	1.64
Others		3,214	5.05
Total		63,615	100.00
Majority		2,972	
CPN (UML) gain			

(निर्वाचन मिति 2079/08/04)

==== मधेस प्रदेश सभा सदस्य बारा ३ ख ====
Party	Candidate	Votes
नेकपा एमाले	मोहम्मद समीर	8,323
जसपा नेपाल	पारस प्रसाद साह	8,255
नेपाली काँग्रेस	जयचन्द्र चौरसिया	5,560
जनमत पार्टी	संतोष प्रसाद पटेल	5,411
Others		8,778
Total		30,767
Result	CPN UML WIN	
Source: Election Commission

=== Election in the 2010s ===
==== 2017 legislative elections (2074/08/04) ====
Party	Candidate	Votes
Federal Socialist Forum, Nepal	Ram Babu Kumar Yadav	21,336
CPN (Unified Marxist–Leninist)	Adayananda Paudel	16,362
Nepali Congress	Farmullah Mansoor	16,086
Others		2,101
Invalid votes		2,929
Result	FSFN gain	
Source: Election Commission

==== 2017 Nepalese provincial elections ====
===== 3(A) =====
Party	Candidate	Votes
CPN (Maoist Centre)	Jwala Kumari Sah	11,771
Nepali Congress	Ramananda Prasad Yadav	10,147
Federal Socialist Forum, Nepal	Ruplal Chaudhari	6,382
Independent	Bharat Bahadur Khadka	1,308
Others		674
Invalid votes		1,279
Result	Maoist Centre gain	
Source: Election Commission

===== 3(B) =====
Party	Candidate	Votes
Federal Socialist Forum, Nepal	Paras Prasad Sah	11,517
Nepali Congress	Jayachandra Prasad Chaurasiya	4,386
Independent	Kamaluddin Ansari	3,739
CPN (Unified Marxist–Leninist)	Mohammad Samiullah	3,430
Others		2,384
Invalid votes		1,370
Result	FSFN gain	
Source: Election Commission

==== 2013 Constituent Assembly election (2070/08) ====
Bara 3
Party	Candidate	Votes
Nepali Congress	Farmullah Mansoor	10,456
CPN (Unified Marxist–Leninist)	Binod Prasad Sah	9,427
Rastriya Madhesh Samajbadi Party	Pramod Prasad Gupta	4,715
UCPN (Maoist)	Shri Prasad Hajara	2,311
Federal Sadbhawana Party	Amiri Lal Raut	2,266
Madhesi Jana Adhikar Forum, Nepal	Santosh Prasad Patel	1,471
Terai Madhes Loktantrik Party	Dhananjaya Prasad Yadav	1,383
Others		6,321
Result	Congress gain	
Source: NepalNews

=== Election in the 2000s ===
==== 2008 Constituent Assembly election (2064) ====
Party	Candidate	Votes
Madhesi Jana Adhikar Forum, Nepal	Pramod Prasad Gupta	16,081
CPN (Unified Marxist–Leninist)	Shri Prasad Paswan	5,708
Nepali Congress	Rishikesh Gautam	5,095
Terai Madhes Loktantrik Party	Kritram Kumhal	3,038
CPN (Maoist)	Shila Yadav	2,573
Sadhbhavana Party	Prakash Chaugai	1,705
Rastriya Janata Dal	Mohammad Kalamuddin	1,089
Rastriya Prajatantra Party	Mohan Prasad Yadav	1,014
Others		4,249
Invalid votes		3,235
Result	Forum Nepal gain	
Source: Election Commission

=== Election in the 1990s ===
==== 1999 legislative elections ====
Party	Candidate	Votes
Nepali Congress	Rishikesh Gautam	22,291
CPN (Unified Marxist–Leninist)	Purushottam Paudel	19,197
Rastriya Prajatantra Party	Prayog Raj Yadav	5,577
CPN (Marxist–Leninist)	Udaya Raj Pandet	3,831
Rastriya Prajatantra Party (Chand)	Deep Bikram Shah	2,043
Nepal Sadbhawana Party	Bishwa Nath Singh Rajput	1,051
Others		1,112
Invalid Votes		1,178
Result	Congress gain	
Source: Election Commission

==== 1994 legislative elections ====
Party	Candidate	Votes
CPN (Unified Marxist–Leninist)	Purushottam Paudel	21,072
Nepali Congress	Rishikesh Gautam	16,848
Rastriya Prajatantra Party	Prayog Raj Yadav	4,242
Nepal Sadbhawana Party	Bishwa Nath Singh Rajput	2,023
Others		1,065
Result	CPN (UML) gain	
Source: Election Commission

==== 1991 legislative elections ====
Party	Candidate	Votes
Nepali Congress	Rishikesh Gautam	18,144
CPN (Unified Marxist–Leninist)	Purushottam Paudel	17,415
Result	Congress gain	

== Notable people ==
1. प्रमोद प्रसाद गुप्ता- पहिलो संविधानसभा सदस्य (2064-2070 BS) नेता- जनमत पार्टी
2. संतोष प्रसाद पटेल: जनमत पार्टीका मधेस प्रदेश उपाध्यक्ष , मधेस आन्दोलनमा २ पटक गोली लागेर घाइते (२०६४ र २०७२)
3. रामबाबु कुमार यादव: पूर्व सङ्घीय सांसद (2074 - 2079 BS)
4. मोहम्मद समिर : भौतिक पूर्वाधार मन्त्री मधेश प्रदेश सरकार र मधेश प्रदेश सभा सदस्य ( दुई पटक 2074 and 2079 BS)
