= Environmental issues in Nepal =

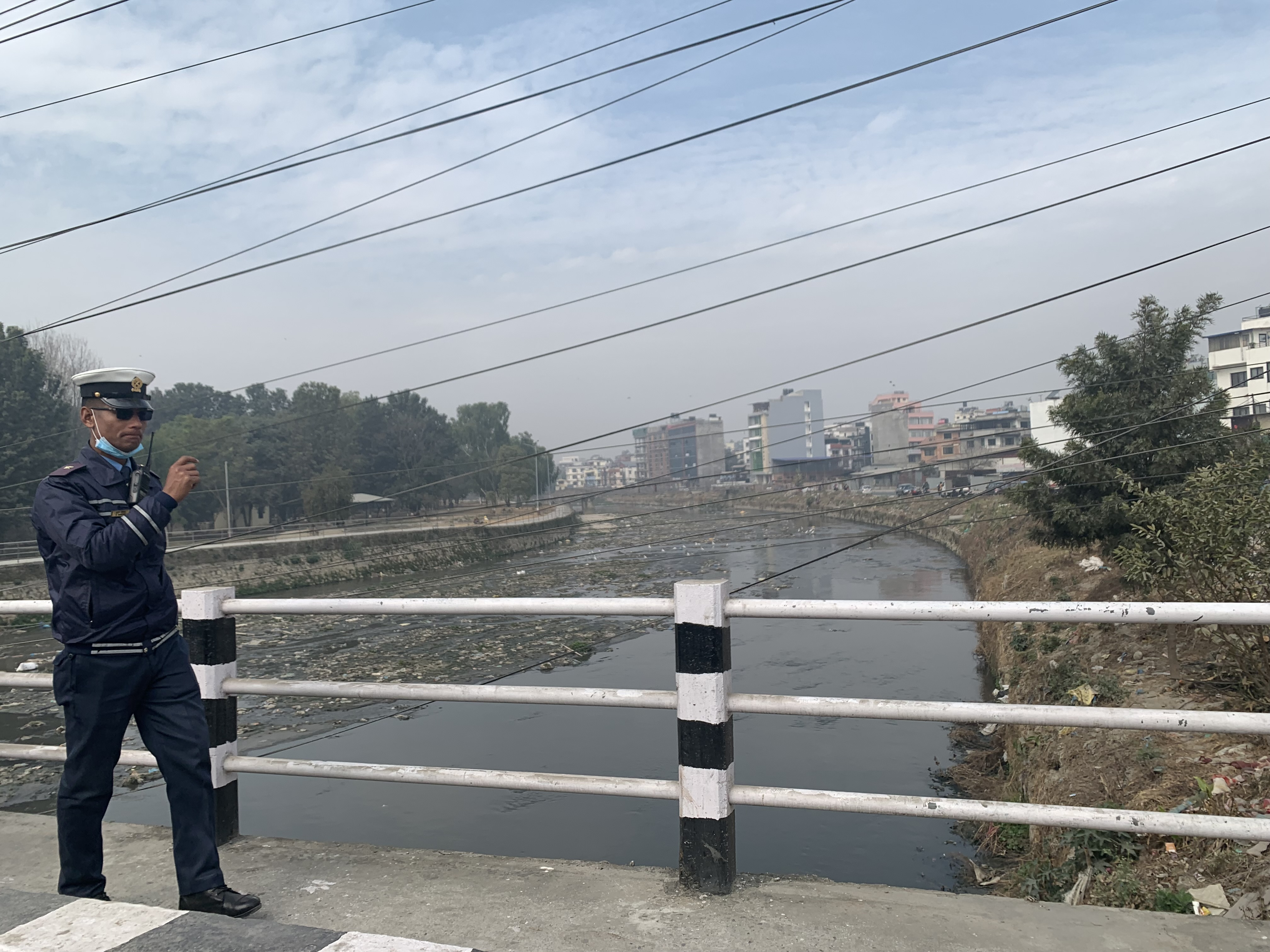
The polluted air visible as smog and piles of trash polluting the Bagmati in Kathmandu, 2023

Environmental issues in Nepal include a number of issues, such as deforestation, climate change, energy and species conservation. Many of these issues have been precipitated by rapid industrialization without major environmental regulation.

== Biodiversity ==
Agro-biodiversity is under threat due to use of high yielding varieties, destruction of natural habitat, overgrazing, land fragmentation, commercialization of agriculture and the extension of modern high yielding varieties, indiscriminate use of pesticides, population growth and urbanization, and changes in farmer's priorities (MFSC, 2000).

More factors for loss of biodiversity include landslide and soil erosion, pollution, fire, overgrazing, illegal trade, hunting and smuggling.

Non-timber forests are threatened by deforestation, habitat degradation and unsustainable harvesting. Major threats to some protected areas are grazing all year around, poaching for high value products, illegal timber harvesting and unsustainable tourism. Rangelands are suffering from an enormous grazing pressure and wetland biodiversity is threatened by encroachment of wetland habitat, unsustainable harvesting of wetland resources, industrial pollution, agricultural runoff, the introduction of exotic and invasive species into wetland ecosystems, and siltation. Mountain biodiversity is suffering due to ecological fragility and instability of high mountain environments, deforestation, poor management of natural resources, and inappropriate farming practices.

== Water and air pollution ==
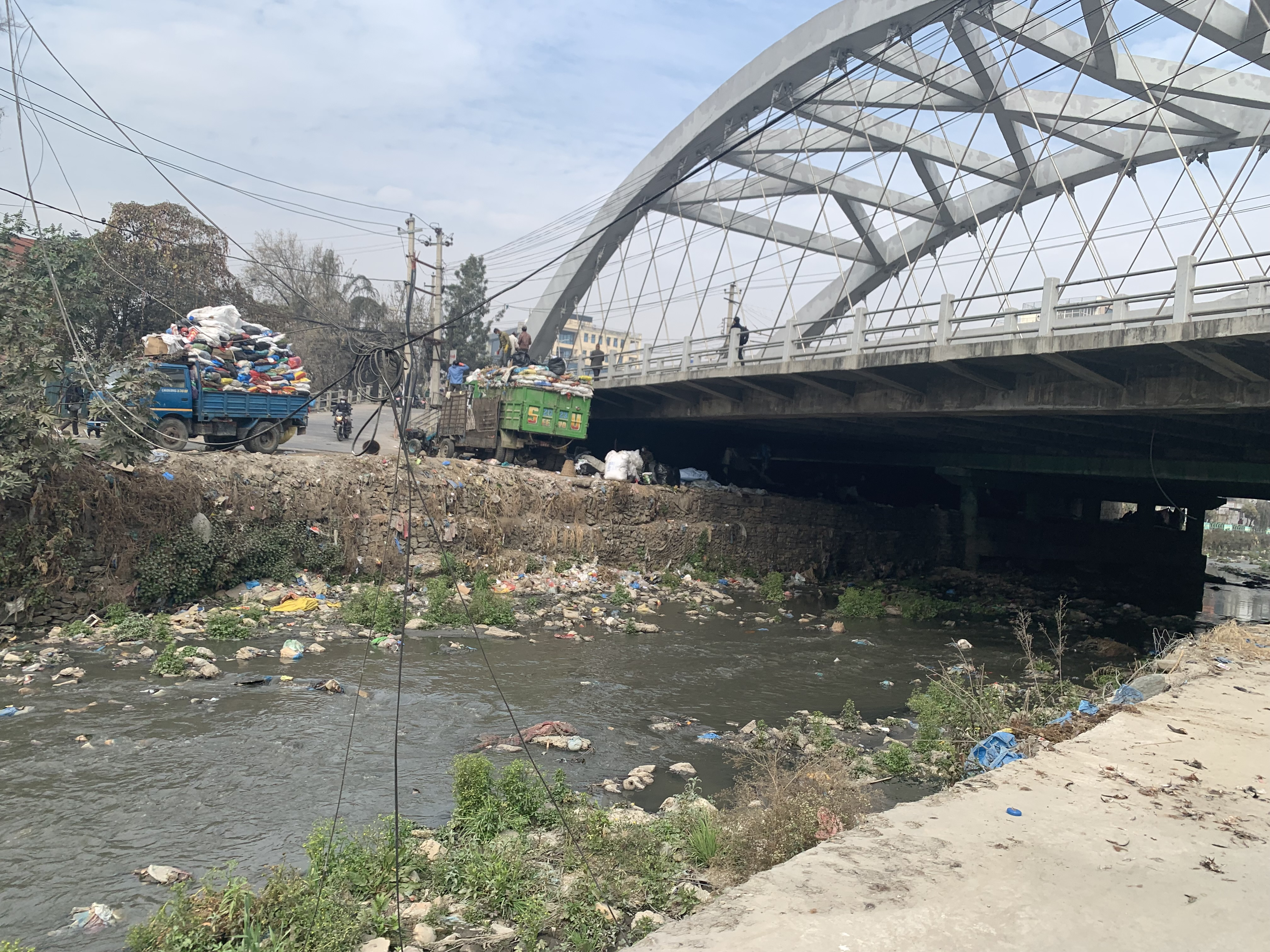
Trash piles along and in the Dhobi Khola in Kathmandu in 2023

Sedimentation and discharge of industrial effluents are prominent sources of water pollution, and the burning of wood for fuel is a significant source of indoor air pollution and respiratory problems. Vehicular and industrial emissions increasingly have contributed to air pollution in urban areas.

=== Water pollution ===
In Nepal, Diarrhea is the 4th leading cause of death. There is still limited systemic monitoring of the water system and water quality. Although 48% of households have access to safe drinking water, 38% still do not have proper sanitation, and 14% practice open defecation or have a lack of sanitation facility. Due to the lack of toilet facilities, inadequate sanitation, and solid waste disposal, children suffer from diarrhea and vector-related diseases.

=== Air pollution ===
The death rate from both indoor and outdoor air pollutants was 133.3 per 100,000 populations(2017) which is the second-highest death rate after due to Cardiovascular diseases in Nepal. There is no complete combust when coal and biomass fuels are burned. They leave some variety of chemicals and gases behind which are usually breathable and can be associated with long-term chronic obstructive pulmonary diseases, cardiovascular disease, and adverse reproductive outcomes. The most vulnerable groups are women and children in household air pollution.

Mainly in rural and mountainous areas of the country, where people often have no ventilation in the home due to cold outdoor temperatures, they tend to use solid and biomass fuel. Almost 64% of indoor cooking is done with firewood, and 10% of households burn cow dung due to lack of improved stoves, gas for cooking, and better ventilation. This is a major problem to cause environmental health issues like conjunctivitis, upper respiratory irritation, and acute respiratory infection. In Kathmandu, ambient air pollution due to construction projects, the high population which results in an increased number of vehicles, and bad conditions of the road lead to hazardous pollution.

Kathmandu experienced prolonged haze from dust and smoke in late 2024, with no significant rainfall for six months. In April 2025, the city had the world's worst air quality, with AQI levels exceeding 400. Pollution in Nepal is not limited to Kathmandu; many southern and eastern regions are also affected, with transboundary pollution from neighboring countries exacerbating the problem. Forest fires in Nepal, India, and Southeast Asia have been a major cause, with dry conditions leading to widespread fires. Despite government warnings and efforts, critics argue that more coordinated and proactive actions are needed to combat the crisis.

== Deforestation ==
Deforestation and land degradation appear to affect a far greater proportion of the population and have the worst consequences for economic growth and individuals’ livelihoods. Forest loss has contributed to floods, soil erosion, and stagnant agricultural output. Estimates suggest that from 1966 to 2000 forest cover declined from 45 to 29 percent of the total land area. Often cited causes of deforestation include population growth, high fuelwood consumption, infrastructure projects, and conversion of forests into grazing- and cropland. According to government estimates, 1.5 million tons of soil nutrients are lost annually, and by 2002 approximately 5 percent of agricultural holdings had been rendered uncultivable as a result of soil erosion and flooding.

Land degradation is attributed to population growth, improper use of agro-chemicals, and overly intensive use of landholdings that are too small to provide most households with sufficient food. Since the late 1980s, government policies have attempted to address these numerous and related problems. Policies often are hampered by lack of funding, insufficient understanding of Nepal's mountain ecosystems, bureaucratic inefficiency, and sometimes contentious relations between the central government and local communities.(MFSC, 2000)

Nepal had a 2018 Forest Landscape Integrity Index mean score of 7.23/10, ranking it 45th globally out of 172 countries.

== Climate change ==
Köppen climate classification map for Nepal for 1980–2016

2071–2100 map under the most intense climate change scenario. Mid-range scenarios are currently considered more likely

Globally, Nepal is ranked fourth in terms of vulnerability to climate change. Floods spread across the foothills of the Himalayas and bring landslides, leaving tens of thousands of houses and vast areas of farmland and roads destroyed. In the 2020 edition of Germanwatch's Climate Risk Index, it was judged to be the ninth hardest-hit nation by climate calamities during the period 1999 to 2018. Nepal is a least developed country, with 28.6 percent of the population living in multidimensional poverty. Analysis of trends from 1971 to 2014 by the Department of Hydrology and Meteorology (DHM) shows that the average annual maximum temperature has been increasing by 0.056 °C per year. Precipitation extremes are found to be increasing. A national-level survey on the perception-based survey on climate change reported that locals accurately perceived the shifts in temperature but their perceptions of precipitation change did not converge with the instrumental records. Data reveals that more than 80 percent of property loss due to disasters is attributable to climate hazards, particularly water-related events such as floods, landslides and glacial lake outburst floods (GLOFs).

The floods of 2018 spread across the foothills of the Himalayas and brought landslides. They have left tens of thousands of houses and vast areas of farmland and roads destroyed. Nepal experienced flash floods and landslides in August, 2018 across the southern border, amounting to US$600 million in damages. There are reports of land which was once used for growing vegetables, and has become barren. Yak herders struggle to find grazing patches for their animals. Scientists have found that rising temperatures could spread malaria and dengue to new areas of the Himalayas, where mosquitoes have started to appear in the highlands.

== Health impacts ==
Environmental Health issues are a not major risk factors for the Global Burden of Diseases. The 3rd leading cause of death in low and middle-income countries is COPD, 5th leading cause is Lower Respiratory Infections and seventh is Diarrheal diseases. In Nepal, COPD is the second major cause of death after Ischemic Heart Diseases. Diarrhea and Lower Respiratory Infections are the 4th and 5th causes of death respectively.

== See also ==
- National Trust for Nature Conservation
