= Madan Prasad Pariyar =

Nepalese climate and agriculture expert

Honourable Madan Prasad Pariyar Dr
- मदन प्रसाद परियार
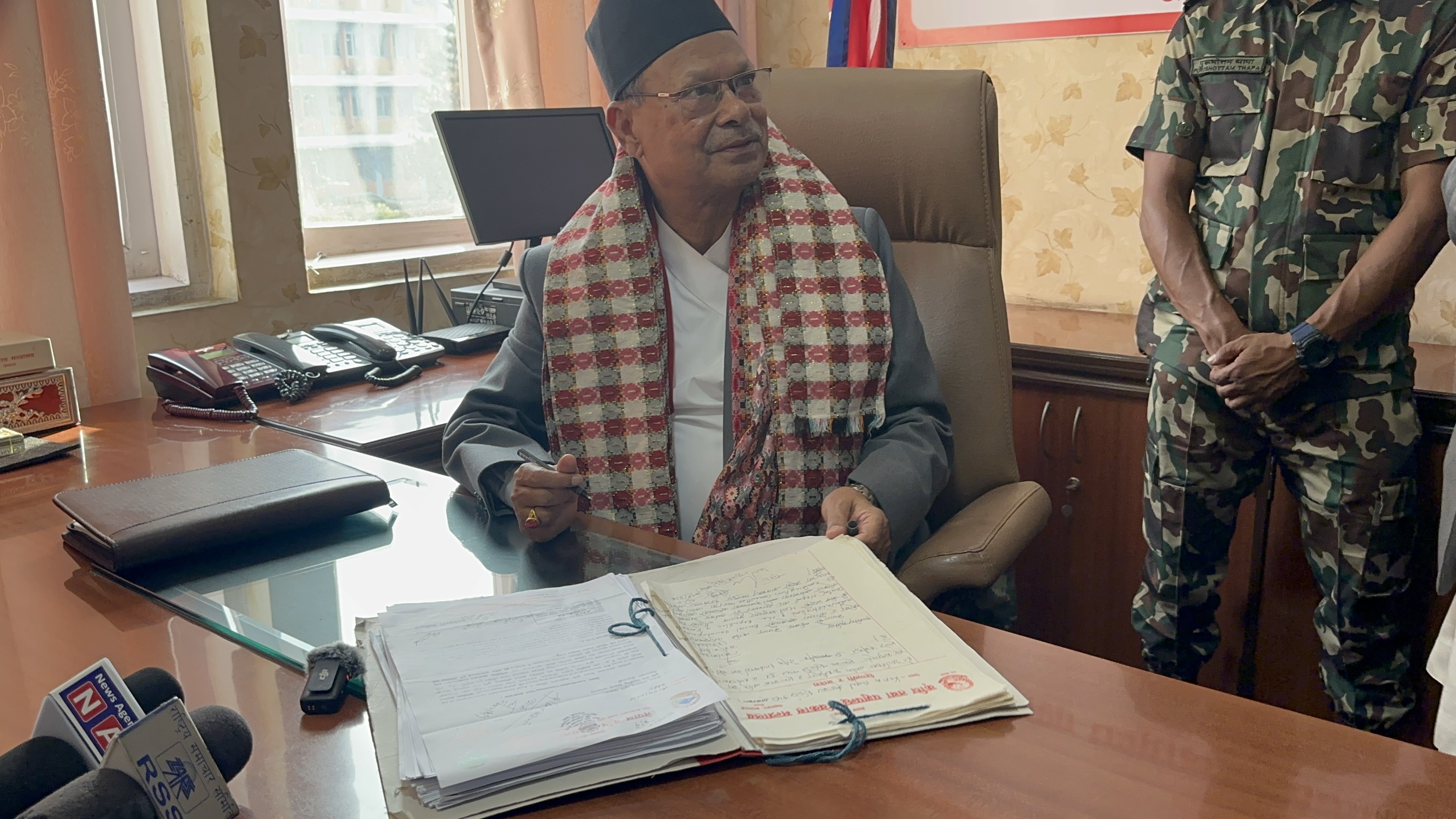
- Madan Pariyar, 2025

Minister of Agriculture and Livestock Development of Nepal
- In office 22 September 2025 – 27 March 2026
- President: Ram Chandra Poudel
- Prime Minister: Sushila Karki
- Vice President: Ram Sahaya Yadav
- Preceded by: Ram Nath Adhikari
- Succeeded by: Geeta Chaudhary

Personal details
- Born: Nepal
- Party: Independent

Madan Prasad Pariyar is a Nepalese Climate & Agriculture expert, and the president of Samata Foundation who served as the Minister for Agriculture and Livestock Development in the interim cabinet of Prime Minister Sushila Karki from 22 September 2025 to 27 March 2026. Pariyar also served as the Minister of Water Supply.

== Early life and education ==
He was born in Rajbiraj, Saptari District, Nepal. He graduated in agricultural engineering from the Allahabad Institute of Agriculture in India and completed his Master's (1989) and PhD (1994) in Agriculture and Food Engineering program from Asian Institute of Technology School of Environment, Resources and development (SERD) in Bangkok, Thailand.

== Climate Leadership and Representation ==
In November 2025, Dr. Pariyar led the Nepali delegation to 30th Conference of Parties to the United Nations Framework Convention on Climate Change (COP30) in Belém, Brazil.

== ICT Development ==
During 2007, Dr Pariyar served as the member secretary for The High Level Commission for Information and Technology (HLCIT). The commission was established by government to provide strategic direction and help formulate appropriate policies for the development of ICT sector in the country. Dr. Pariyar has authored several research and scientific publications. In his paper presented at the International Conference on Theory and Practice of Electronic Governance (ICEGOV) '07 conference, Pariyar presented a holistic vision for Nepal's e-Government development, offering detailed insights into its opportunities, challenges, and implementation strategies.

== Development Sector Leadership ==
He was a senior consultant with IDE.

== Others ==
He was general manager of Udayapur Cement and Agricultural Tools Factory in Birgunj.

== Personal life ==
Born in Rajbiraj, Saptari district of Nepal, Pariyar currently resides in Chandragiri municipality in Kathmandu.

== Bibliography ==
Pariyar, Madan, and BK Arjun Kumar. "Connecting Dalit Land Rights and Climate Justice." In Environmental Justice in Nepal, pp. 71–81. Routledge, 2024. https://www.taylorfrancis.com/chapters/oa-edit/10.4324/9781003371175-9/connecting-dalit-land-rights-climate-justice-madan-pariyar-arjun-kumar

Sultana, Parvin, Paul Michael Thompson, Naya Sharma Paudel, Madan Pariyar, and Mujibur Rahman. 2019. “Transforming Local Natural Resource Conflicts to Cooperation in a Changing Climate: Bangladesh and Nepal Lessons.” Climate Policy 19 (sup1): S94–106. doi:10.1080/14693062.2018.1527678.

Ambrosino, Chiara, Rachel Rose, Madan Pariyar, Trang Bui, Rakesh Kothari, Suzanne Phillips, and L. Savino. "Effect of market system interventions on household resilience: comparison of two methodologies." In Resilience Measurement, Evidence and Learning Conference-New Orleans, pp. 1–13. 2018. https://www.researchgate.net/profile/Rachel-Rose-5/publication/333703429_Effect_of_market_system_interventions_on_household_resilience_comparison_of_two_methodologies/links/5cffe2a892851c874c5f7cde/Effect-of-market-system-interventions-on-household-resilience-comparison-of-two-methodologies.pdf

Pariyar, Madan P. "E-government initiatives in Nepal: challenges and opportunities." In Proceedings of the 1st international Conference on theory and Practice of Electronic Governance, pp. 280–282. 2007. https://doi.org/10.1145/1328057.1328115

Pariyar P, Madan. "Water and poverty linkages in mountainous areas: A case study from Nepal." (2003) Water and Poverty Linkages: Water and Poverty Linkages: Case Studies from Nepal, Pakistan and Sri Lanka. https://catalog.ihsn.org/citations/10664
