= Rato Machindranath Jatra =

Chariot festival in Nepal

Rato Machindranath Jatra / bhoto jatra
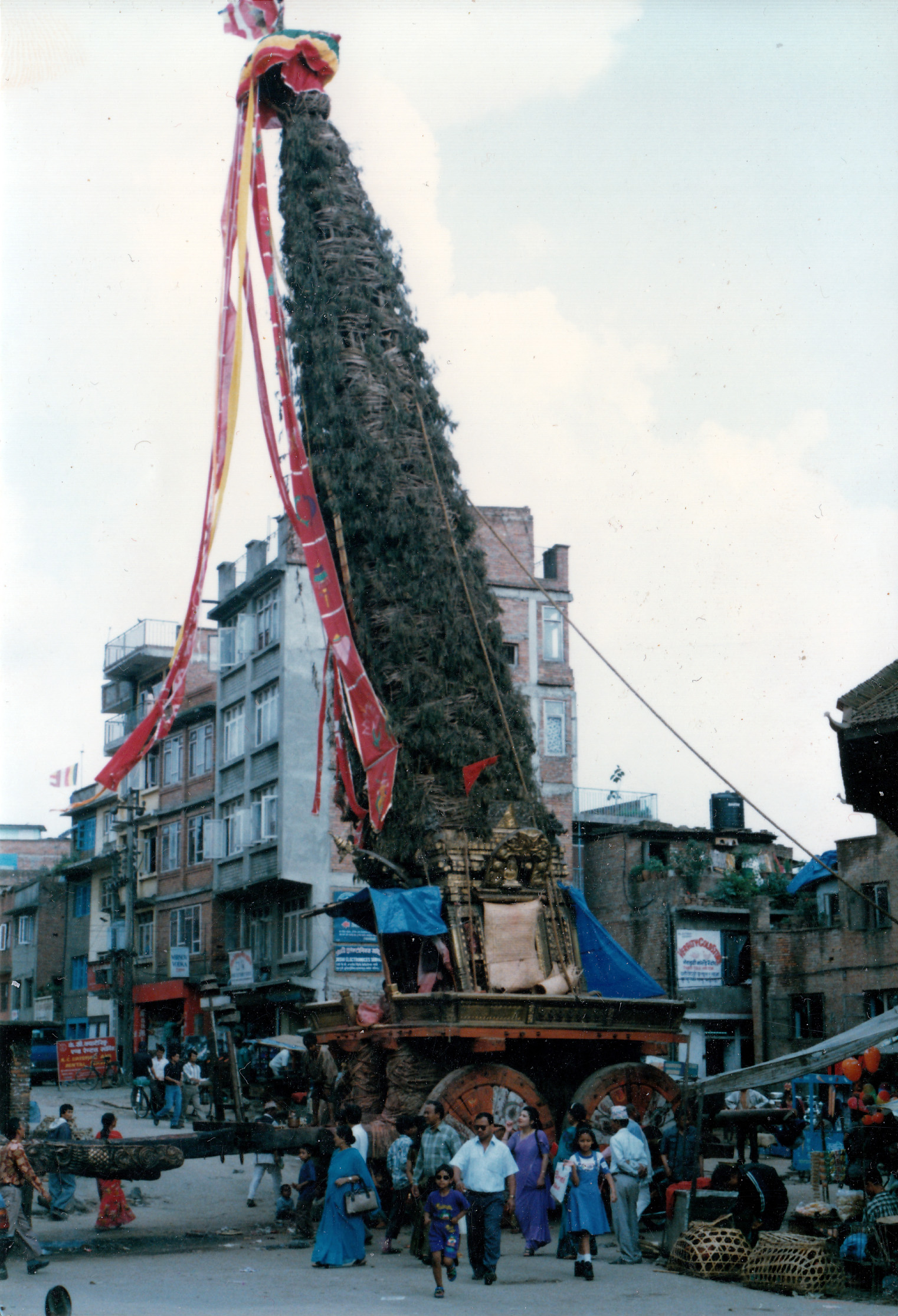
- The chariot of Bunga Dyah
- Also called: Buṅga Dyaḥ Jātrā
- Observed by: Nepalese
- Type: Religious
- Significance: Celebrate to pray for monsoon rains and a good harvest
- Begins: Baishakh Shukla Pratipada
- Ends: around Asar Shukla Chauthi
- Related to: Matsyendranatha (Buddhist and Hindu saint)

Rato Machindranath Jatra (Nepali: रातो मच्छिन्द्रनाथको रथयात्रा), also known as Buṅga Dyaḥ Jātrā (Newar: बुंग द्यः जात्रा) is a Nepalese chariot festival which is held in Lalitpur, Nepal. It is one of the greatest religious events in the city and the longest chariot festival celebrated in the country.

The festival is dedicated to Buṅga Dyaḥ, who is also venerated as Karunamaya (Newar: करुणामय, "the compassionate one"), an aspect of the Bodhisattva Avalokiteśvara and is popularly believed to bring the monsoon rains. He is also identified as an aspect of the Hindu saintes Machhindranātha. More specifically, he is referred as Rato Machhindranath in Nepali, where Rato, meaning "red", is a reference to the colour of the deity's image. The chariot festival is held according to the lunar calendar, so the date is changeable. It begins on the 4th day of the bright fortnight of Bachhalā, the seventh month in the lunar Nepal Sambat calendar.

== Chariot procession ==
The chariot procession was instituted to celebrate the arrival of Bunga Dyah in Nepal and the end of a devastating drought. It was started when Narendra Deva was the king (640-683 AD).

Preparations for the festival begin with the construction of a 60-foot tall chariot at Pulchok at the western end of Lalitpur. When the chariot is complete, the image of Bunga Dyah from his temple is installed in it. Revellers then drag the chariot through the streets of Lalitpur on a tour that lasts a month. The chariot of Bunga Dyah is accompanied on the journey by a similar but smaller chariot of Chākuwā Dyah (चाकुवा द्यः).

The route of the chariot procession starts at Pulchok and passes through Gabahal, Mangal Bazar, Hakha, Sundhara, Chakrabahil, Lagankhel and ends at Jawalakhel. As per time-honored tradition, the chariot is pulled exclusively by men on the stretch between the localities of Iti and Thati. This part of the chariot procession is known as Yākah Misāyā Bhujyā (याकः मिसाया भुज्या).

The parade finishes at the open ground of Jawalakhel which is situated at the western side of Lalitpur. There, the festivities conclude with the ceremony of Bhoto Jatra, the display of the bhoto, a traditional Nepalese vest.

During the "Barha Barsa Jatra", that happens once in every 12 years, the chariot of the Machhindranath is constructed at Bungamati. The chariot is pulled all the way from Bungamati through Bhaisepati, Nakkhu, Bhanimandal, Jhamsikhel and to Pulchowk. The chariot is pulled from Jhamsikhel (near Ideal Model School) to Pulchowk at night. Then the chariot is pulled through the town at its normal route. After the Bhoto Jatra ceremony at Jawalakhel, the idol of Rato Machhindranath is taken back to Bungamati, where it spends the 6 months of the year.

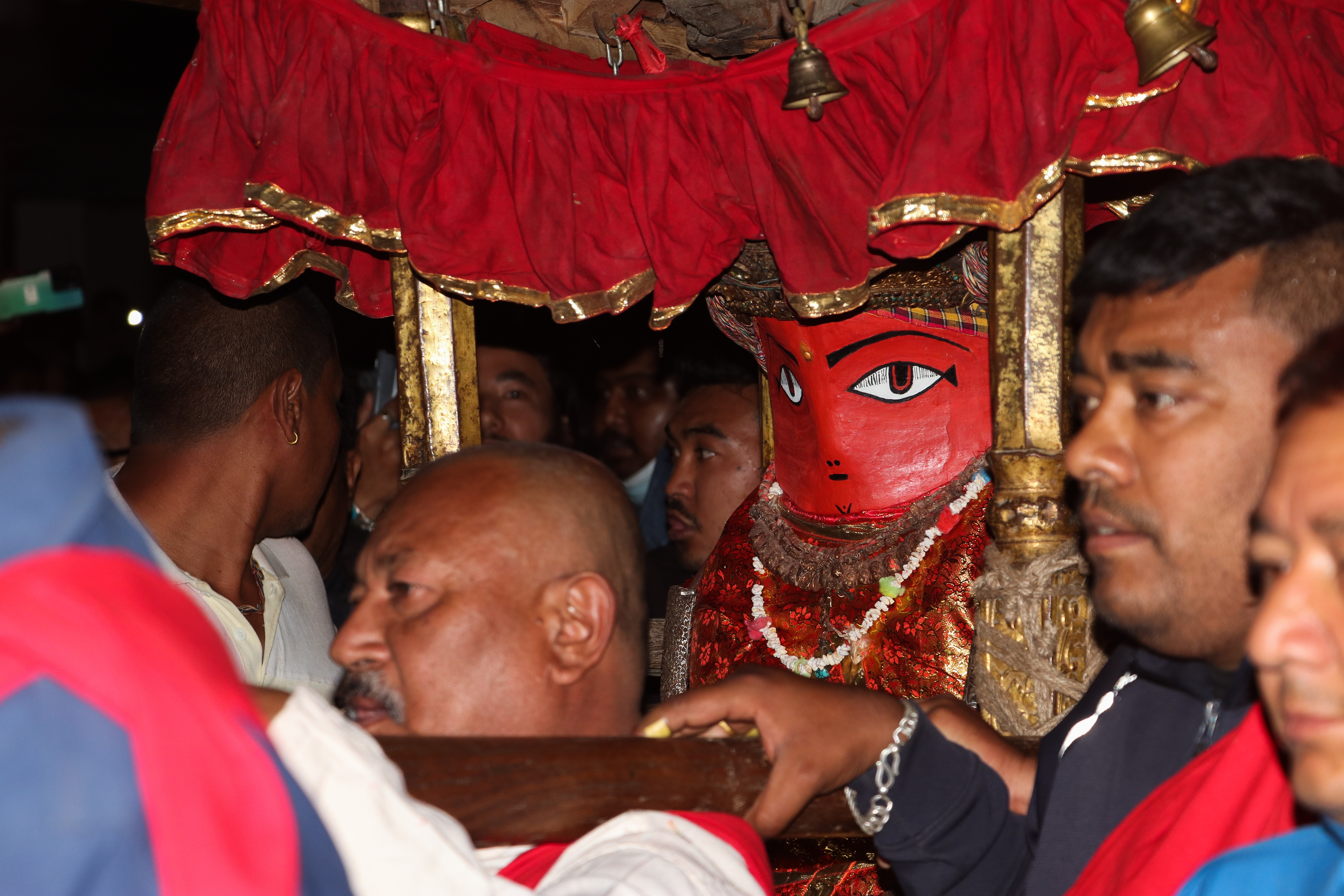
The idol of Rato Machhindranath being carried from the temple to be ascended in the chariot at Pulchowk, Patan, Lalitpur

== History ==
In the past, for 12 years, there was no rainfall, and all the river dried off. To find out the solution to this problem, the King of Bhaktapur kingdom at that time went to Swayambhu to meet Tantrik. Then, the Tantrik said that Guru Gorakhnath was angry, so he was meditating on the cushion of 9 mighty serpents whose duty was to make of rainfall in the valley.

Until and unless the serpents would be free, rainfall wouldn't happen in the valley. It was possible only when his teacher Rato Machhindranath met him. So the king started searching for his teacher. After some time, they found out that Machhindranath was reborn as the 108th son of King Sashi in Assam.

Then the king of Bhaktapur, Tantrik from Kathmandu, and a Newar from Lalitpur went to Assam to bring Machhindranath back. They knew that it wouldn’t be easy to get him back because he was the son of Daitya. They tried a lot of techniques but they were not successful in bringing him back.

Then the Tantrik called 4 Bhairabs and asked them to bring him back. Bhairabs brought him back to Guru Gorakhnath, whose anger settled down and he became calm after seeing his teacher. Finally, the serpents were free and the rain started raining on the valley.

Now, the king, Tantrik, and Newar couldn't decide where Rato Machhindranath should be kept, so they went to Lalitpur King to find the solution. Lalitpur King was very clever as he chose to keep Rato Machhindranath in Lalitpur. From that day, every year, people celebrate this festival in Lalitpur and pray for good rainfall.

== Bhoto Jatra ==
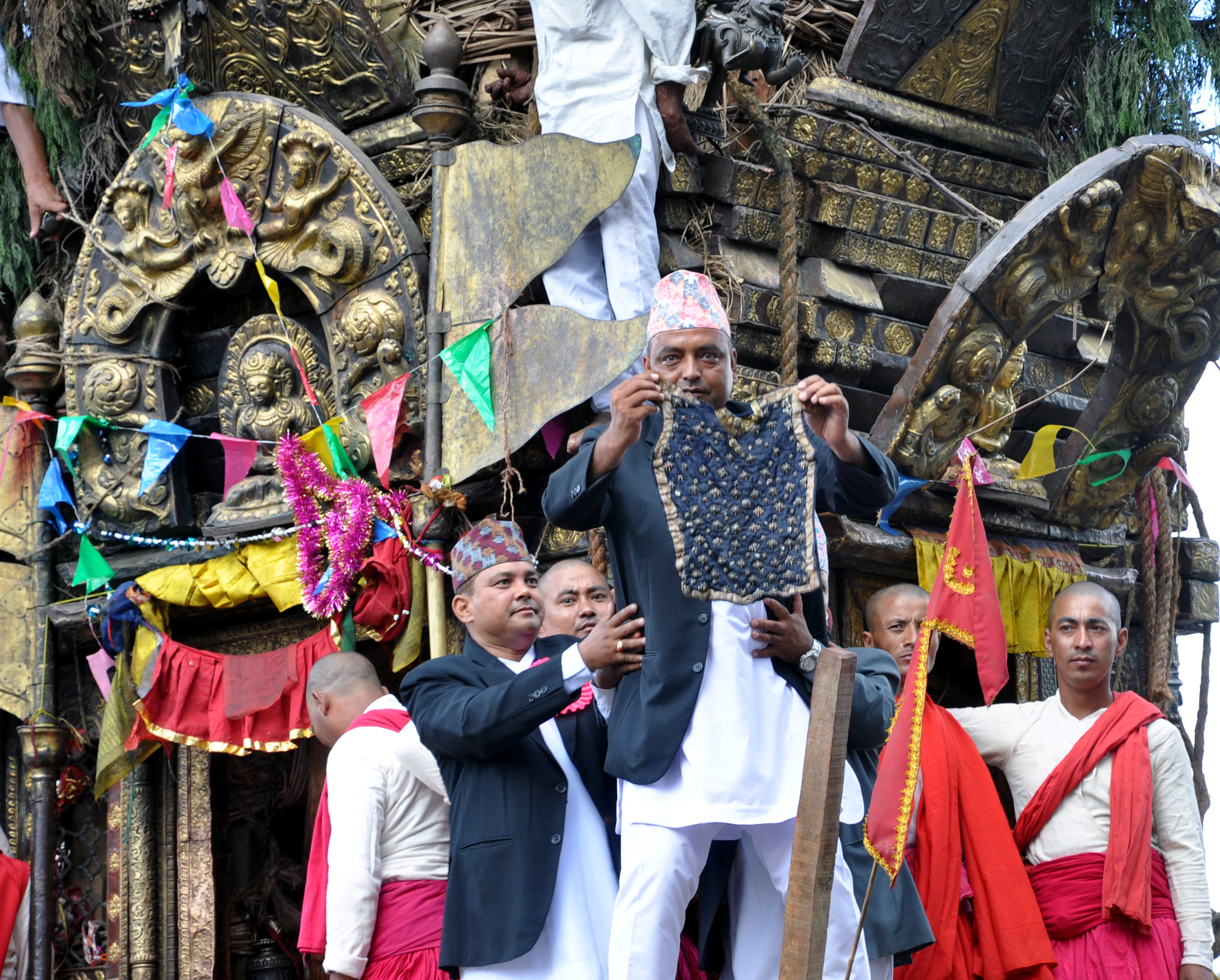
Showing the vest to the crowds on Bhoto Jatra

Bhoto Jatra, which literally means "vest festival", is the climax of the chariot procession of Bunga Dyah Jatra. As per Nepal Bhasa the Jatra should be considered as Pwaklo Jatra because Pwaklo refers to Vest while Bhoto has sleeves.

After the two chariots arrive in Jawalakhel, astrologers choose an auspicious date to hold the Bhoto Jatra festival. On the appointed day in the presence of the head of state, a government official climbs on to the chariot and holds up a jewel-studded black vest from the four sides of the chariot so that all the people gathered around can have a look at it.

The display is a re-enactment of an event that happened eons ago. According to legend, a Jyapu (Newar farmer) lost the vest which he had received as a gift from the serpent god Karkotaka Naga for doing him a favour. There are two legends of the favor one of them being the Jyapu providing him some ayurvedic herbs by examining the ill wife of Karkotaka Naga which healed her. Another legend says that the Jayapu was frightened when Karkotaka Naga asked for some herbs to cure his ill wife so the Jyapu who didn't have any idea regarding herbs gave him his own 'khiti'(dirts from his sweaty body) that healed her.

One day, the farmer had come to Jawalakhel to watch the chariot pulling festival where he saw someone wearing his missing garment. A quarrel developed over the vest, and since neither party could prove ownership, it was agreed that the undershirt would be kept with Bunga Dyah until the rightful owner comes to claim it with adequate proof. Since then, the vest has been shown to the public annually as a call to potential claimants to step forward.

The living goddess Kumari of Patan also arrives in Jawalakhel to observe Bhoto Jatra. She watches the ceremony from a special rest house. The auspicious day when Bhoto Jatra is held is determined by astrologers, so the date varies each year. In 2026, Bhoto Jatra was scheduled to be held on 20 June at Jawalakhel, Lalitpur.

After the festival, the chariot is dismantled and the parts are stored until it is time for the procession the next year. Rato Machhendranath is taken to a temple in the nearby village of Bungamati, also known as the first home of the rain god. The deity spends the next six months in that temple.

== Gallery ==
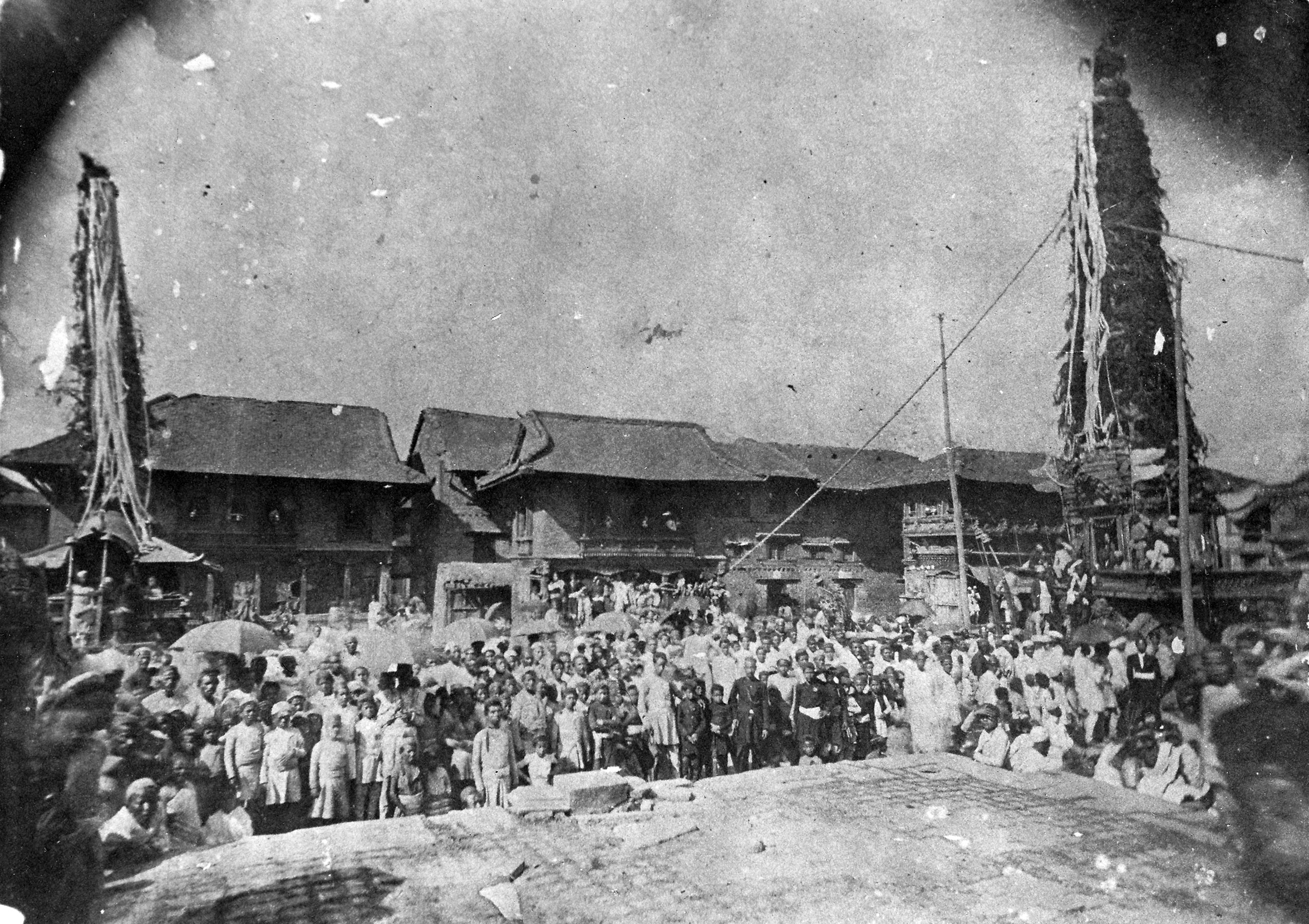
Chakuwa Dyah and Bunga Dyah ca 1920s

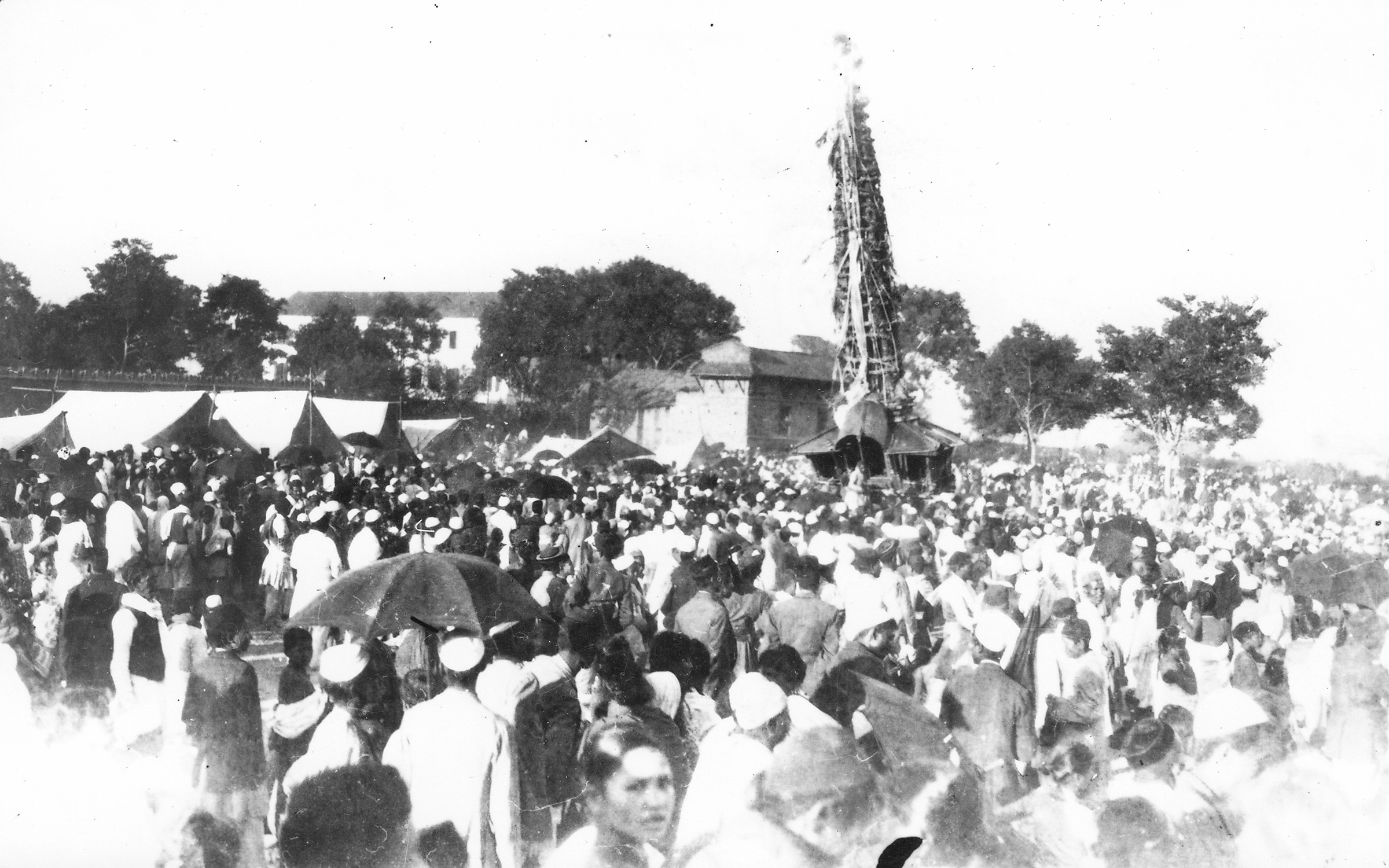
Chariot of Chakuwa Dyah ca 1930s

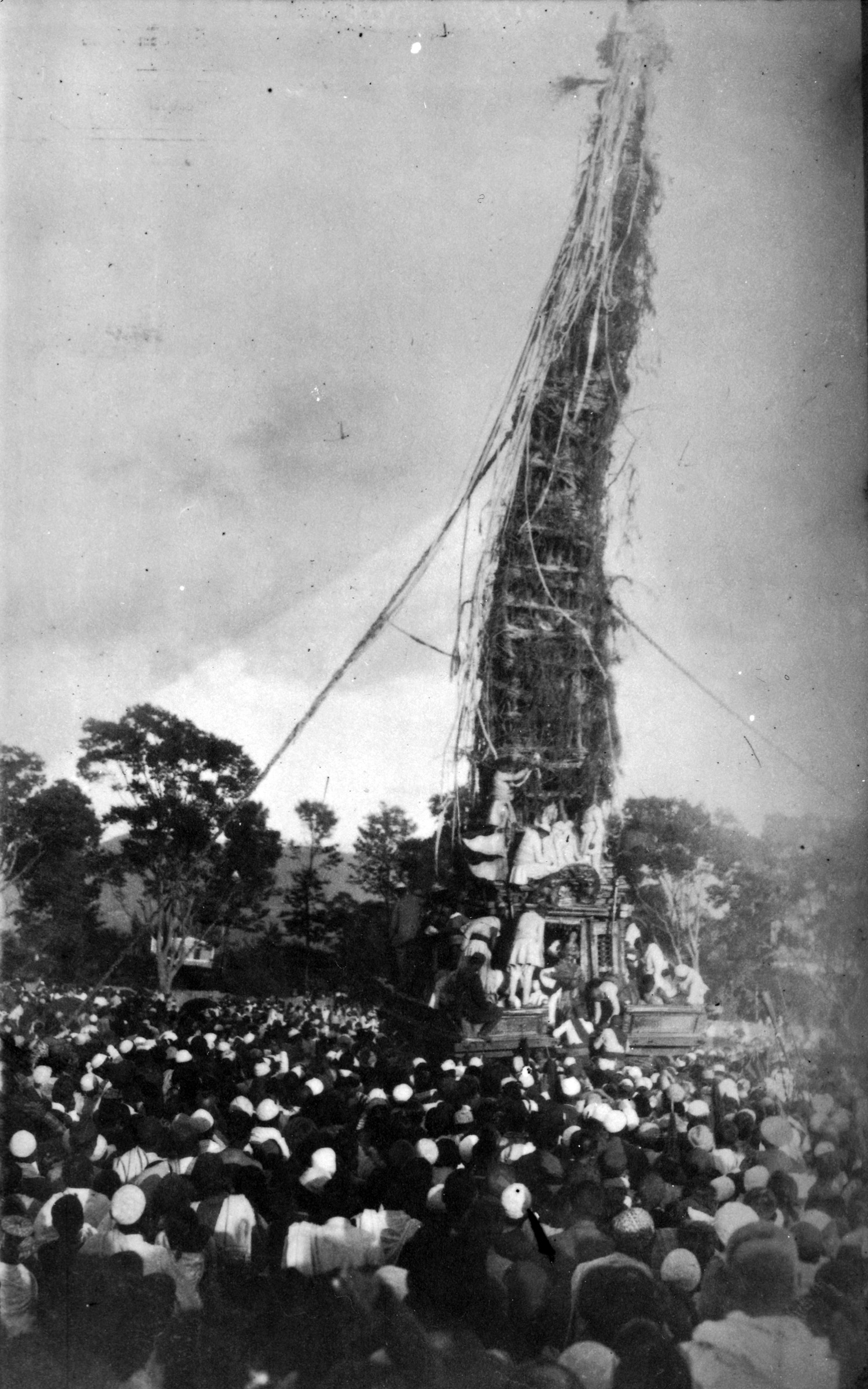
Chariot of Bunga Dyah ca 1930s

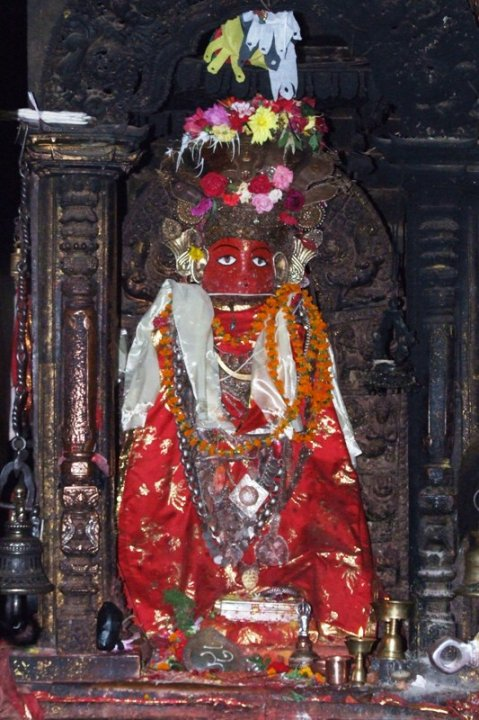
Rato Machhendranath (Bunga Dyah)

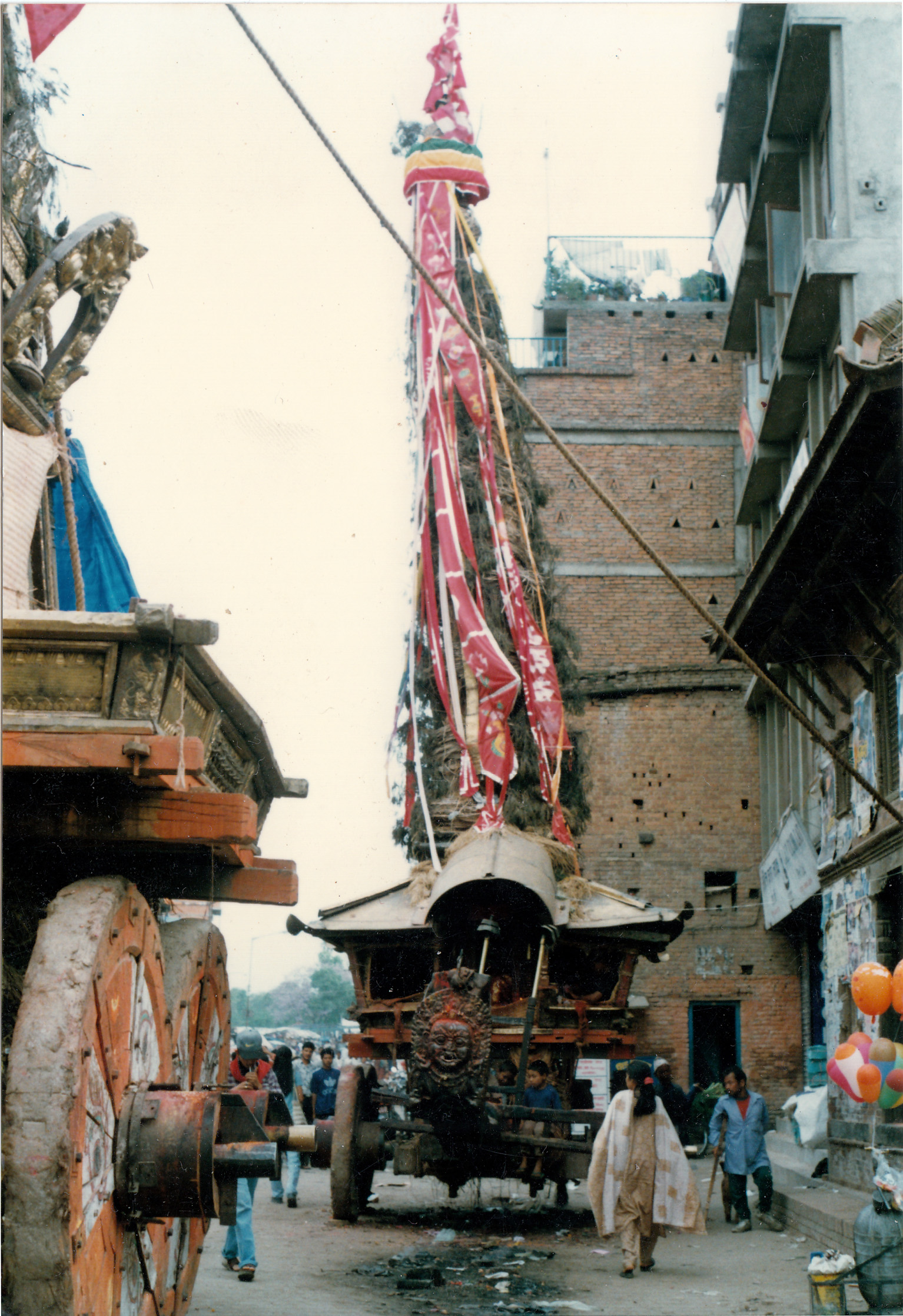
The chariot of Minnath (Chakuwa Dyah)

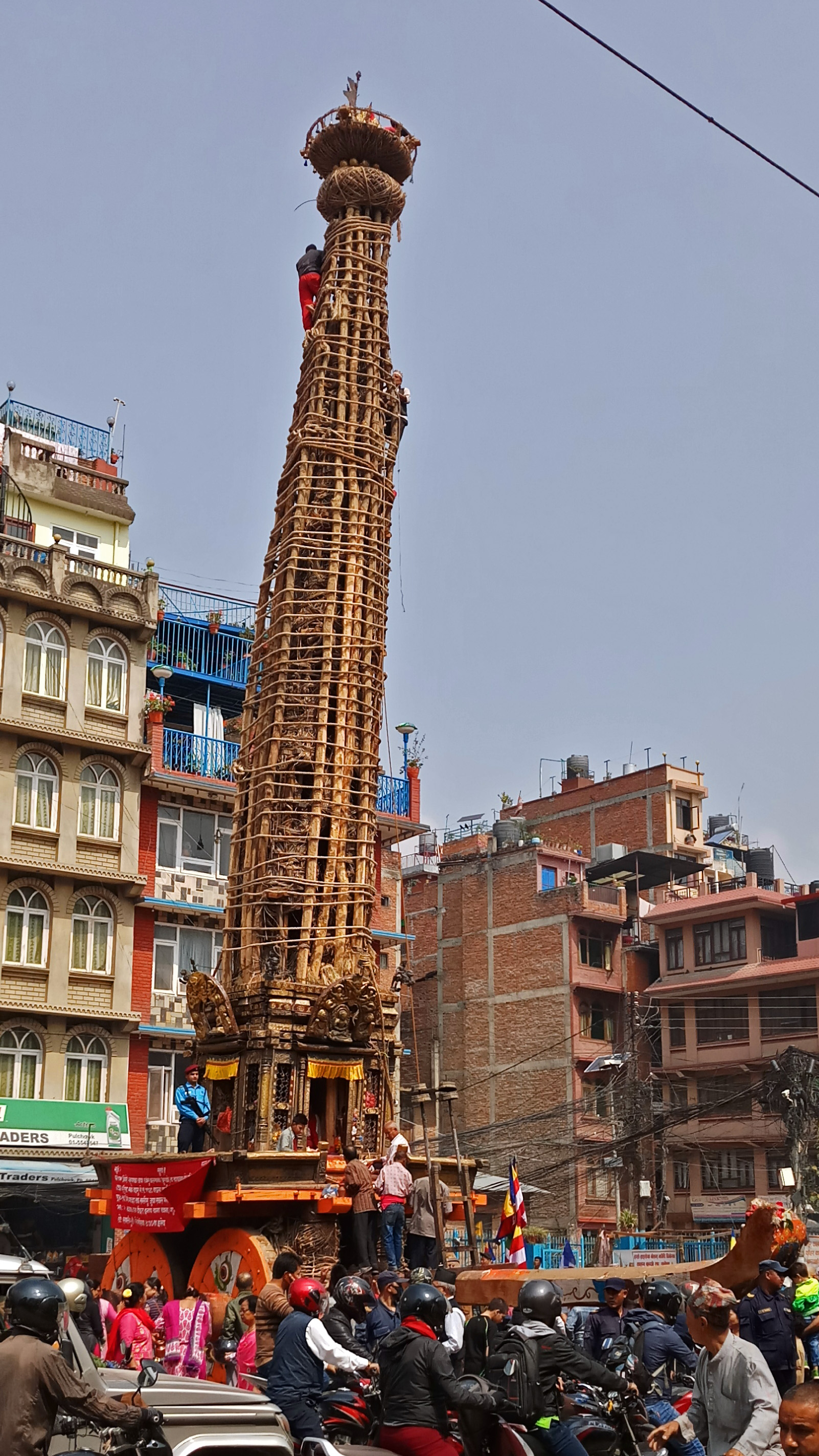
Chariot under construction

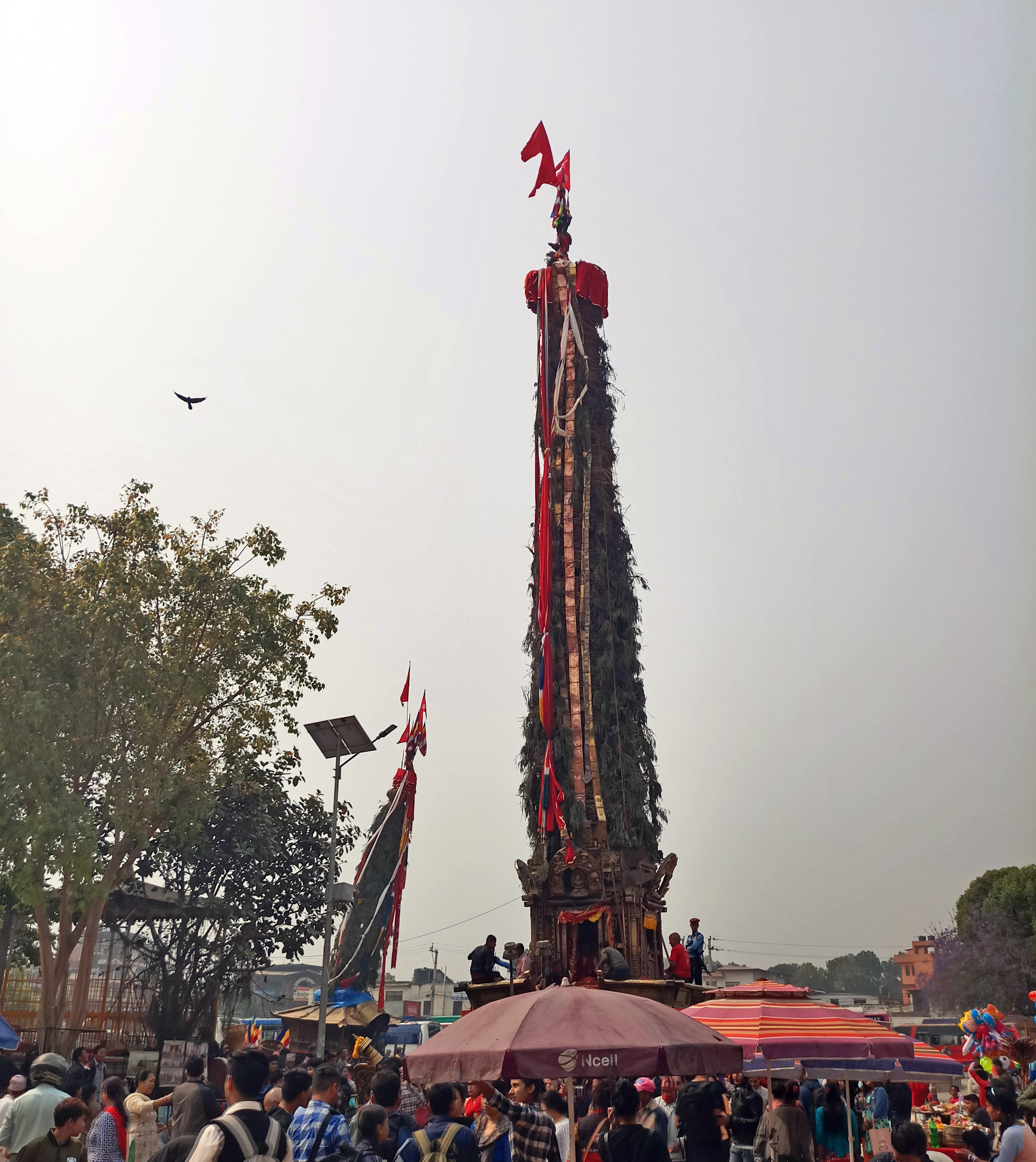
Chariots of Rato Machhindranath and Minnath at Lagankhel, Patan

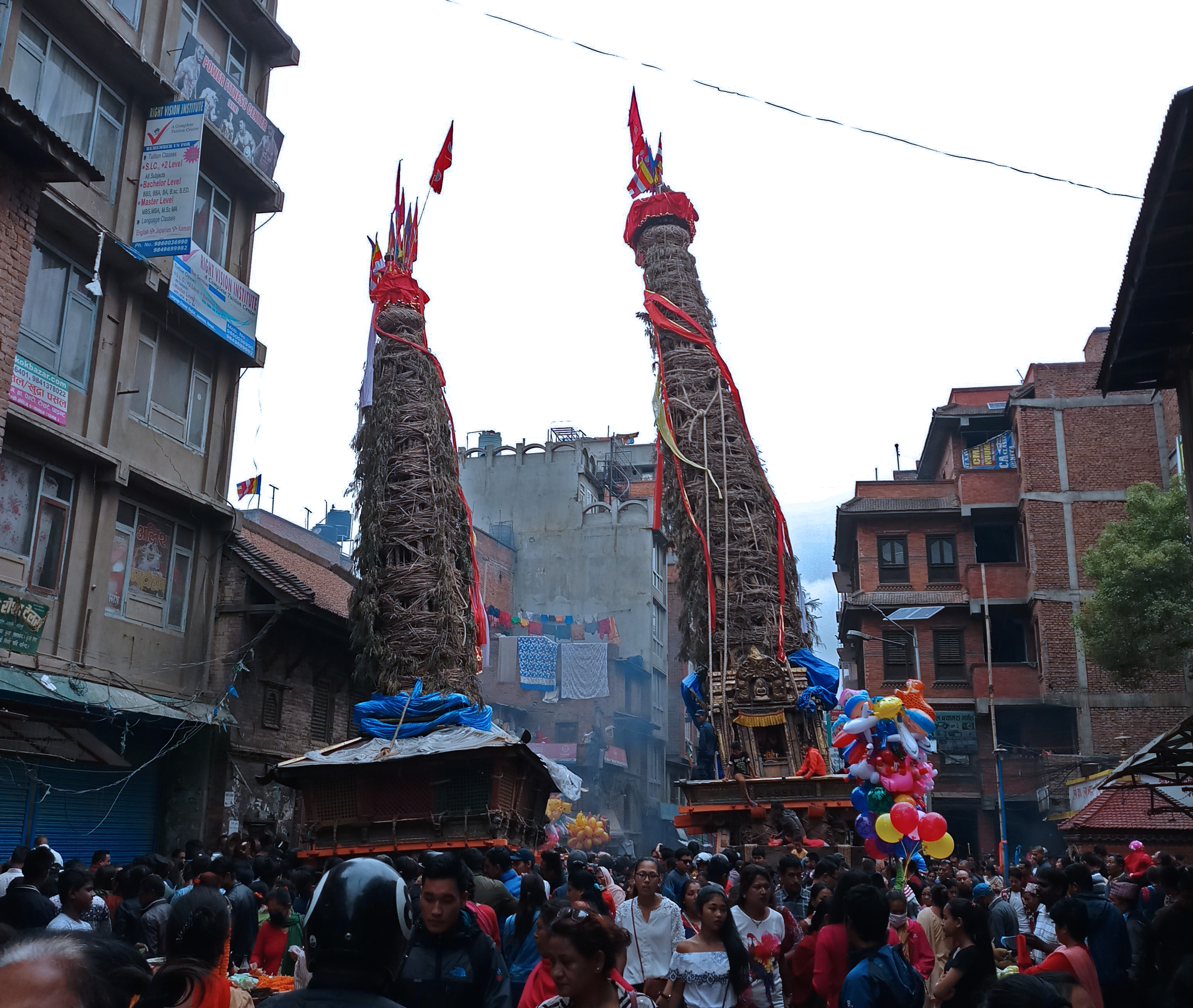
Chariots of Rato Machhindranath and Minnath at Lagankhel
