= Ananda Bahadur Chand =

Nepalese politician

The Honourable Ananda Bahadur Chand
- आनन्दबहादुर चन्द

Member of Parliament, Pratinidhi Sabha
- Incumbent
- Assumed office 26 March 2026
- Preceded by: Dilli Raj Pant
- Constituency: Kailali 5

Personal details
- Citizenship: Nepalese
- Party: Rastriya Swatantra Party
- Education: Tribhuvan University (MSc)
- Alma mater: Institute of Science and Technology, Nepal (PhD) (pursuing)
- Profession: Politician; assistant professor

Ananda Bahadur Chand (Nepali: आनन्दबहादुर चन्द) is a Nepalese politician serving as a member of parliament from the Rastriya Swatantra Party. He is the member of the 7th Pratinidhi Sabha elected from Kailali 5 constituency in the 2026 Nepalese general election, securing 31,953 votes and defeating his closest contender Nar Narayan Shah of the Nepali Congress.

Chand was an assistant professor of Chemistry at Patan Multiple Campus from 2008 to 2025. He is pursuing a PhD in Organic Chemistry from Institute of Science and Technology under Tribhuvan University, in collaboration with North Carolina A&T State University, USA.

Chand is a former chairperson of Ankuram Academy of Bharatpur, Chitwan, as well as Boston International College.
