= Paras Prasad Sah =

Nepalese politician

- पारस प्रसाद साह

Province Assembly Member of Madhesh Province
- In office 2017–2022
- Preceded by: N/A
- Constituency: Bara 3 (constituency)

Personal details
- Born: December 1, 1967 (age 58)
- Party: People's Socialist Party, Nepal
- Occupation: Politician

Paras Prasad Sah (Nepali: पारस प्रसाद साह) is a Nepalese politician. He is a former member of Provincial Assembly of Madhesh Province from People's Socialist Party, Nepal. Sah, a resident of Prasauni Rural Municipality, was elected via 2017 Nepalese provincial elections from Bara 3(B). He later contested the 2022 provincial elections as a candidate of the Janata Samajbadi Party, Nepal, narrowly losing by 68 votes. In 2026, he was elected as a Secretary of the Janamat Party during its general convention. See his biography and details @ https://parasprasadsah.blogspot.com/

== Electoral history ==
=== 2017 Nepalese provincial elections ===
Party	Candidate	Votes
Federal Socialist Forum, Nepal	Paras Prasad Sah	11,517
Nepali Congress	Jayachandra Prasad Chaurasiya	4,386
Independent	Kamaluddin Ansari	3,739
CPN (Unified Marxist–Leninist)	Mohammad Samiullah	3,430
Others		2,384
Invalid votes		1,370
Result	FSFN gain	
Source: Election Commission
