= Mrigendra Kumar Singh Yadav =

Nepali politician

Honourable Mrigendra Kumar Singh Yadav
- मृगेन्द्र कुमार सिंह यादव
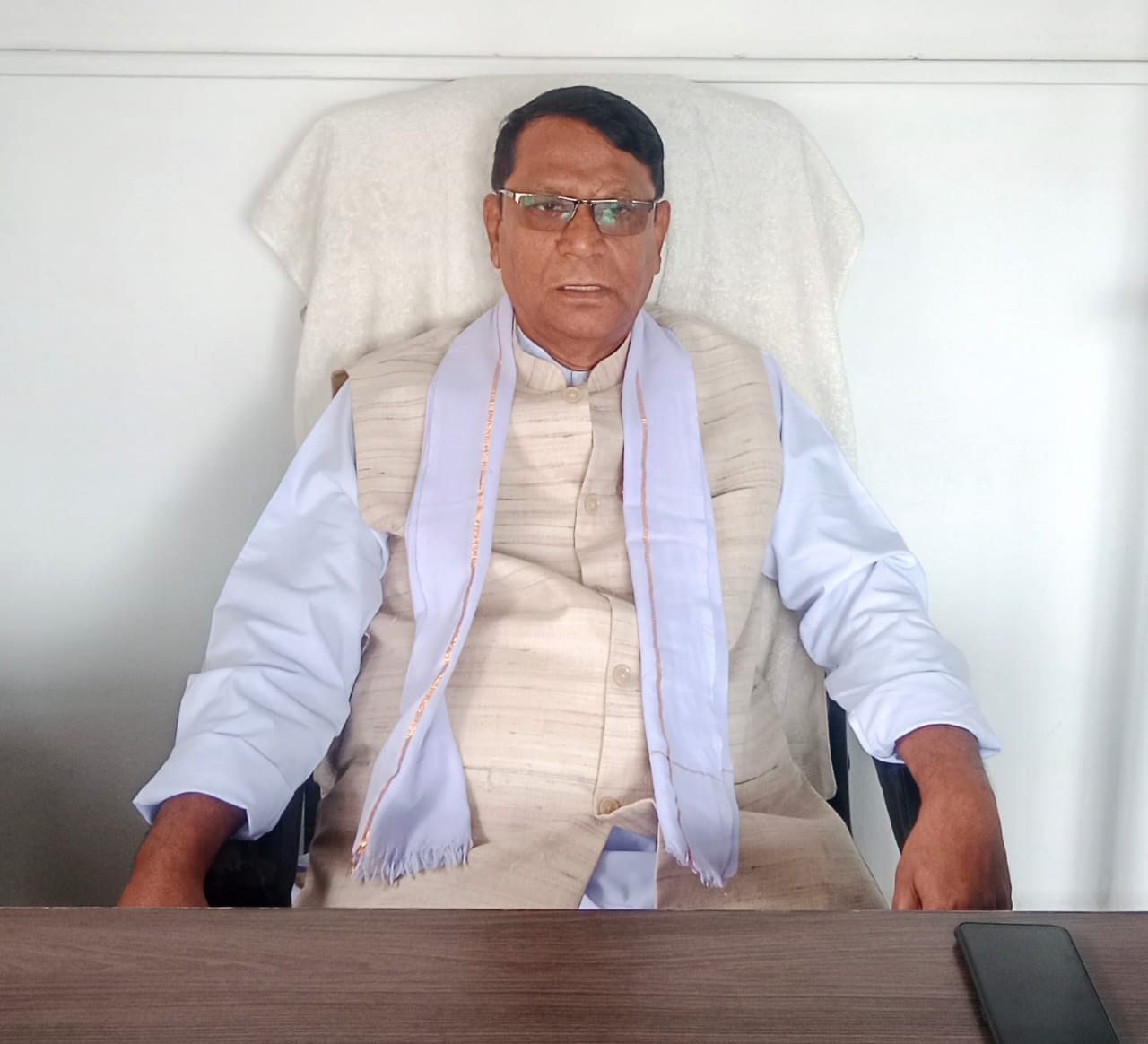

Minister of Agriculture and Livestock Development
- In office 4 August 2022 – 14 October 2022
- President: Bidya Devi Bhandari
- Prime Minister: Sher Bahadur Deuba
- Preceded by: Mahindra Ray Yadav
- Succeeded by: Sher Bahadur Deuba (as Prime Minister)

General secretary of Madheshi Jana Adhikar Forum, Nepal (Loktantrik)
- In office 2009–2017
- President: Bijay Kumar Gachhadar
- Preceded by: Position created

Member of Rastriya Sabha
- Incumbent
- Assumed office 4 March 2020
- Prime Minister: Sher Bahadur Deuba

Personal details
- Party: People's Socialist Party, Nepal

Mrigendra Kumar Singh Yadav (Nepali: मृगेन्द्र कुमार सिंह यादव) is a Nepalese politician belonging to People's Socialist Party, Nepal. Yadav is former Minister for Agriculture and Livestock Development.

He is also member of Rastriya Sabha and serves as leader of the parliamentary party in the house.
