= Jawalakhel =

Jawalakhel जावलाखेल
- Urban Subdivision
- Location in Nepal
- Coordinates: 27°40′N 85°19′E
- Country: Nepal
- Province: Bagmati Province
- District: Lalitpur District
- Time zone: UTC+5:45 (Nepal Time)

Jāwalākhel (Nepali: जावलाखेल) is a subdivision of Lalitpur in Nepal. It is located 2 km from the ancient city centre Pātan, one of the three great capitals of Nepal until the 18th century. It derives its name from "जा हुल्य: खल:(English: Jaa Hulya Khala)", an open field currently used as Volleyball training ground and Football field. Jaulakhel Durbar, a palace located in Jawalakhel that was built by Bir Shumsher Jang Bahadur Rana in 1954 BS and Central Zoo are also located here.

== Origin of the name ==
Jawalakhel means "rice throwing field" in Nepal Bhasa. The name is derived from the large open field at the town's center where cooked rice is offered during an annual religious festival. The field is the venue of Bhoto Jātrā, the festival of the display of the sacred vest, which is the most important cultural event held in Jawalakhel.

== Highlights ==
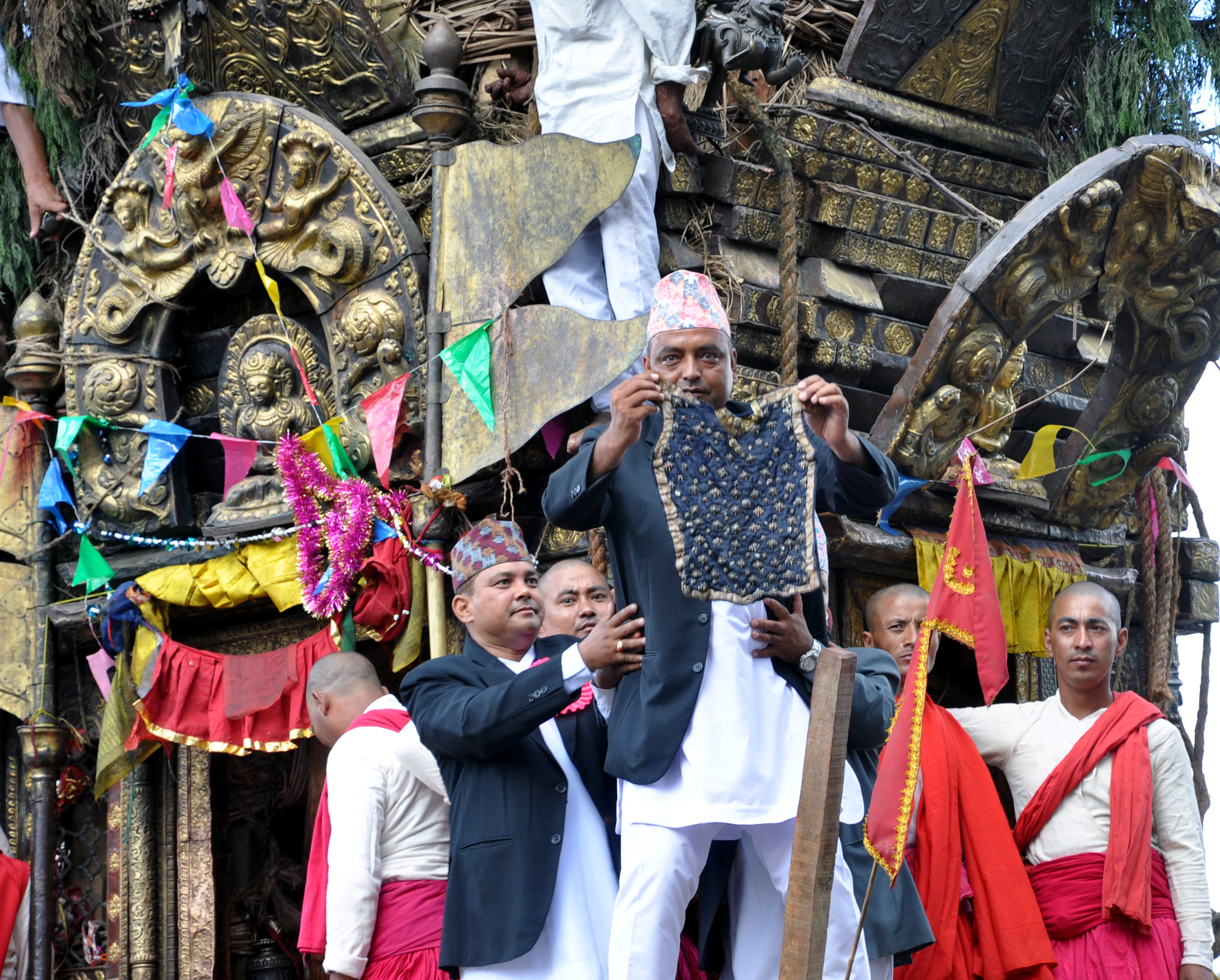
Showing the vest to the crowd

Bhoto Jatra is the concluding ceremony of the chariot festival of Bunga Dyah, the longest street celebration held in Patan. During the chariot festival which lasts over a month, two towering chariots containing images of the deities Bunga Dyah (Machhendranath) and Chākuwā Dyah (Minnāth) are pulled through the streets of Lalitpur in stages.

The chariots are brought to Jawalakhel for the concluding ceremonies. During Bhoto Jatra, the holy garment "bhoto" is held up from the four sides of the chariot and shown to the enraptured throng that fills the large field.

Jawalakhel is also famed as the home of Central Zoo, the only zoo in the country. It was built by General Maheshwar Shamshere Rana and his team as a private menagerie for Prime Minister Maharaja Juddha Shamshere Rana in 1932. The government was gifted the zoo by Maharaja Juddha when he volunteered to resign from his Prime Ministership, and left as a sanyasi for India. It was opened to the public in 1956. In December 1995, the government handed over responsibility of running the zoo for 30 years to the National Trust for Nature Conservation.

Jawalakhel is the cradle of Nepal's hand-woven woolen carpet industry. In 1960, the government of Nepal, the International Red Cross and the Swiss Aid for Technical Assistance worked together and set up a factory in Jawalakhel where Tibetan refugees could produce Tibetan handicraft to support themselves. The refugees used their hereditary skills and wove woolen carpets like the type traditionally made in Tibet, and an industry was born in Nepal.

In the recent times, Jawalakhel has emerged as one of the most happening places in Lalitpur district with many shopping centres, clothing stores, cafes, restaurants, schools, banks and other modern amenities.

== Transportation ==
Busses of Sajha Yatayat serve Jawalakhel and link it to Kathmandu. Other private Bus companies also stop at several points in the neighborhood.
