= Minister of Agriculture, Forests and Environment =

Head of the Ministry of Agriculture, Forests and Environment of Government of Nepal

Minister of Agriculture and Livestock Development
- कृषि तथा पशुपन्छी विकास मन्त्रालय
- Emblem of Nepal

- Flag of Nepal
- Incumbent; Geeta Chaudhary since 27 March 2026
- Ministry of Agriculture and Livestock Development
- Style: Honourable
- Member of: Council of Ministers
- Reports to: Prime Minister, Parliament
- Seat: Singha Durbar, Nepal
- Nominator: Prime Minister
- Appointer: President
- Term length: No fixed term
- Precursor: Minister of Agriculture, Land Management and Cooperatives

The Minister of Agriculture and Livestock Development (Nepali: कृषि तथा पशुपन्छी विकास मन्त्री) is the head of the Ministry of Agriculture and Livestock Development. One of the senior-most officers in the Federal Cabinet, the minister responsible for growth and development of agriculture and livestock sector is an ex-officio member of Nepal Agricultural Research Council, Nepal Veterinary Council and National Tea and Coffee Development Board. The Minister is assisted by the Minister of State for Agriculture and Livestock Development and the junior Deputy Minister of Agriculture and Livestock Development.

The current minister is Geeta Chaudhary who assumed office on 27 March 2026 after the formation of new government under Prime Minister Balendra Shah.

== List of former ministers ==
| # | | Name | Took of office | | | Prime Minister | | Minister's Party |
|---|---|---|---|---|---|---|---|---|
| 1 | | Chakrapani Khanal (Note: Chakrapani Khanal was in charge of the Ministry of Agriculture, Land Management and Cooperatives until 2 August 2018, however, due to a cabinet expansion, Padma Kumari Aryal became the new Minister of Land Management, Cooperatives and Poverty Alleviation, while Khanal's portfolio was changed to Ministry of Agricultural and Livestock Development.) | 16 March 2018 | 20 November 2019 | 614 | . | KP Sharma Oli | CPN (UML) |
| 1 | | Chakrapani Khanal | 16 March 2018 | 20 November 2019 | 614 | . | KP Sharma Oli | NCP |
| 2 | | Ghanashyam Bhusal | 20 November 2019 | 25 December 2020 | 401 | . | KP Sharma Oli | NCP |
| 3 | . | Padma Kumari Aryal | 25 December 2020 | 4 June 2021 | 161 | . | KP Sharma Oli | CPN (UML) |
| 4 | . | Jwala Kumari Sah | 10 June 2021 | 22 June 2021 | 12 | . | KP Sharma Oli | CPN (UML) |
| 5 | . | Basanta Kumar Nemwang | 24 June 2021 | 12 July 2021 | 18 | . | KP Sharma Oli | CPN (UML) |
| – | | Sher Bahadur Deuba | 13 July 2021 | 8 October 2021 | 87 | | Sher Bahadur Deuba | Nepali Congress |
| 6 | | Mahindra Ray Yadav | 8 October 2021 | 4 July 2022 | 269 | | Sher Bahadur Deuba | PSP-Nepal |
| 7 | | Mrigendra Kumar Singh Yadav | 4 August 2022 | 14 October 2022 | 71 | | Sher Bahadur Deuba | PSP-Nepal |
| – | | Sher Bahadur Deuba | 14 October 2022 | 26 December 2022 | 73 | | Sher Bahadur Deuba | Nepali Congress |
| 8 | | Jwala Kumari Sah | 26 December 2022 | 27 February 2023 | 63 | | Pushpa Kamal Dahal | CPN (UML) |
| – | | Pushpa Kamal Dahal | 27 February 2023 | 31 March 2023 | 32 | | Pushpa Kamal Dahal | CPN (MC) |
| 9 | | Beduram Bhusal | 31 March 2023 | 4 March 2024 | 339 | | Pushpa Kamal Dahal | CPN (US) |
| – | | Pushpa Kamal Dahal | 4 March 2023 | 6 March 2023 | 2 | | Pushpa Kamal Dahal | CPN (MC) |
| 10 | | Jwala Kumari Sah | 6 March 2024 | 3 July 2024 | 119 | | Pushpa Kamal Dahal | CPN (UML) |
| – | | Pushpa Kamal Dahal | 4 July 2024 | 15 July 2024 | 11 | | Pushpa Kamal Dahal | CPN (MC) |
| 11 | | Ram Nath Adhikari | 15 July 2024 | 9 September 2025 | 421 | | KP Sharma Oli | Nepali Congress |
Vacant (9 – 12 September 2025)
| – | | Sushila Karki | 12 September 2025 | 22 September 2025 | 10 | | Sushila Karki | Independent |
| 12 | | Madan Prasad Pariyar | 22 September 2025 | 27 March 2026 | 186 | | Sushila Karki | Independent |
| 13 | | Geeta Chaudhary | 27 March 2026 | Incumbent | 207 | | Balendra Shah | Rastriya Swatantra Party |
