= Arvind Sah =

Nepalese politician

- अर्विंद साह

Member of Parliament, Pratinidhi Sabha
- Incumbent
- Assumed office 26 March 2026
- Preceded by: Jwala Kumari Sah
- Constituency: Bara 3

Personal details
- Citizenship: Nepalese
- Party: Rastriya Swatantra Party
- Profession: Politician; Entrepreneur

Arvind Sah (Note: Nepali: अर्विंद साह) is a Nepalese politician and entrepreneur serving as a member of parliament from the Rastriya Swatantra Party. He is the member of the 3rd Federal Parliament of Nepal elected from Bara 3 constituency in 2026 Nepalese General Election securing 40,697 votes and defeating Farmulla Mansur of the Nepali Congress. He is the co-founder of Nepali digital wallet Khalti.
