= Dilli Raj Pant =

Nepalese politician

Honourable Dilli Raj Pant
- डिल्ली राज पन्त

Member of Parliament, Pratinidhi Sabha
- In office 22 December 2022 – 12 September 2025
- Succeeded by: Ananda Bahadur Chand
- Constituency: Kailali 5

Personal details
- Born: 24 February 1956 (age 70) Kailali District
- Party: Nepali Congress
- Spouse: Pashupati Pant
- Parent: Chet Raj Pant (father)

Dilli Raj Pant is a Nepalese politician, belonging to the Nepali Congress currently serving as a member of the 2nd Federal Parliament of Nepal. In the 2022 Nepalese general election, he won the election from Kailali 5 (constituency).
