= Farmullah Mansoor =

Nepali politician

- फरमुल्लाह मन्सुर

Deputy General Secretary of Nepali Congress
- Incumbent
- Assumed office 16 December 2021
- Preceded by: Prakash Sharan Mahat

Minister of Labour and Employment
- In office 7 June 2017 – 15 February 2018
- President: Bidhya Devi Bhandari
- Prime Minister: Sher Bahadur Deuba
- Preceded by: Surya Man Gurung
- Succeeded by: Gokarna Bista

Personal details
- Party: Nepali Congress
- Education: Tribhuvan University

Farmullah Mansoor is a Nepalese politician. Mansoor is Deputy general secretary of Nepali Congress. He is also the member of 2nd Nepalese Constituent assembly. He was elected to the Pratinidhi Sabha in the 1999 election on behalf of the Nepali Congress.

== Electoral history ==
=== 2017 legislative elections ===
Bara 3
Party	Candidate	Votes
Federal Socialist Forum, Nepal	Ram Babu Kumar Yadav	21,336
CPN (Unified Marxist–Leninist)	Adayananda Paudel	16,362
Nepali Congress	Farmullah Mansoor	16,086
Others		2,101
Invalid votes		2,929
Result	FSFN gain	
Source: Election Commission

=== 2013 Constituent Assembly election ===
Bara 3
Party	Candidate	Votes
Nepali Congress	Farmullah Mansoor	10,456
CPN (Unified Marxist–Leninist)	Binod Prasad Sah	9,427
Rastriya Madhesh Samajbadi Party	Pramod Prasad Gupta	4,715
UCPN (Maoist)	Shri Prasad Hajara	2,311
Federal Sadbhawana Party	Amiri Lal Raut	2,266
Madhesi Jana Adhikar Forum, Nepal	Santosh Prasad Patel	1,471
Terai Madhes Loktantrik Party	Dhananjaya Prasad Yadav	1,383
Others		6,321
Result	Congress gain	
Source: NepalNews

=== 1999 legislative elections ===
Bara 4
Party	Candidate	Votes
Nepali Congress	Farmullah Mansoor	24,409
CPN (Unified Marxist–Leninist)	Mahmood Aalam	16,927
CPN (Marxist–Leninist)	Salim Miya Ansari	8,269
Rastriya Prajatantra Party	Brijlal Prasad Bhagat	7,211
Nepal Sadbhawana Party	Bharat Prasad Kalwar	2,132
Others		1,389
Invalid Votes		1,317
Result	Congress gain	
Source: Election Commission

=== 1994 legislative elections ===
Bara 4
Party	Candidate	Votes
CPN (Unified Marxist–Leninist)	Salim Miya Ansari	20,148
Nepali Congress	Farmullah Mansoor	16,848
Rastriya Prajatantra Party	Mohan Prasad Nepali	6,318
Nepal Sadbhawana Party	Amrita Devi Agrahari	3,529
Independent	Yogendra Dhanuk	1,668
Others		1,806
Result	CPN (UML) hold	
Source: Election Commission

=== 1991 legislative elections ===
Bara 4
Party	Candidate	Votes
CPN (Unified Marxist–Leninist)	Salim Miya Ansari	20,547
Nepali Congress	Farmullah Mansoor	16,036
Result	CPN (UML) gain	
