= Narad Muni Rana =

Nepali politician

- नारद मुनि राना
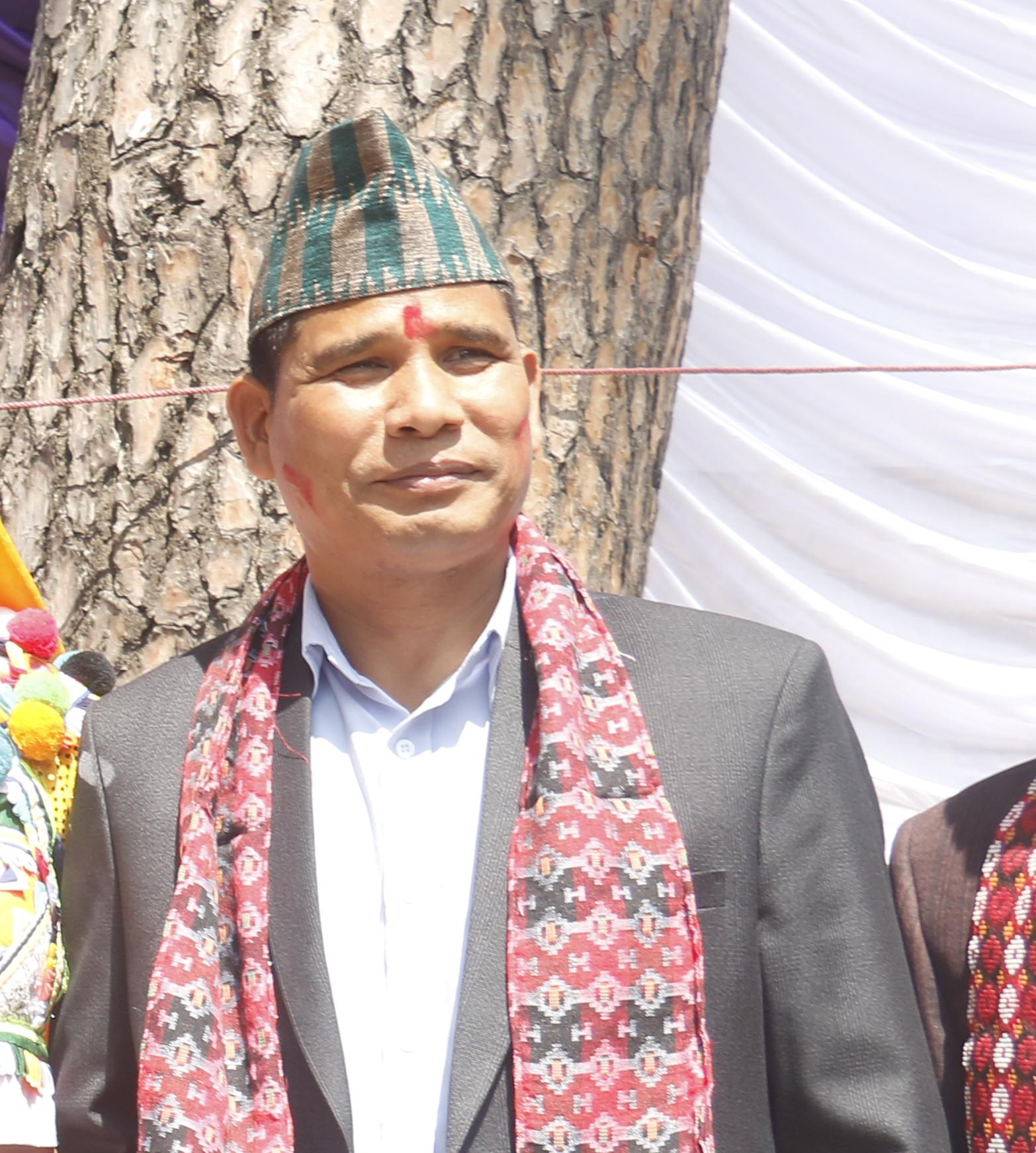
- Rana during the Hori Milan program in Kathmandu, organized by the Nepal Ranatharu Youth Society.

Minister of Forests and Environment
- In office 10 June 2021 – 22 June 2021
- President: Bidhya Devi Bhandari
- Prime Minister: KP Sharma Oli
- Preceded by: Prem Ale
- Succeeded by: Pradeep Yadav

Member of Parliament, Pratinidhi Sabha
- In office 4 March 2018 – 18 September 2022
- Preceded by: Dirgha Raj Bhatta
- Constituency: Kailali 5

Member of Constituent Assembly for CPN (UML) party list
- In office 28 May 2008 – 28 May 2012

Personal details
- Born: 1 May 1972 (age 53) Kailali District
- Party: CPN (UML)

Narad Muni Rana is a Nepalese politician and was Minister of Forests and Environment. He was serving as the Member Of House Of Representatives (Nepal) elected from Kailali-5 constituency. He is member of the Communist Party of Nepal (UML).
