= Kailali 5 =

Parliamentary constituency in Nepal

- Parliamentary constituency for the House of Representatives
- Kailali 5 in Sudurpashchim Province; Protected areas in green

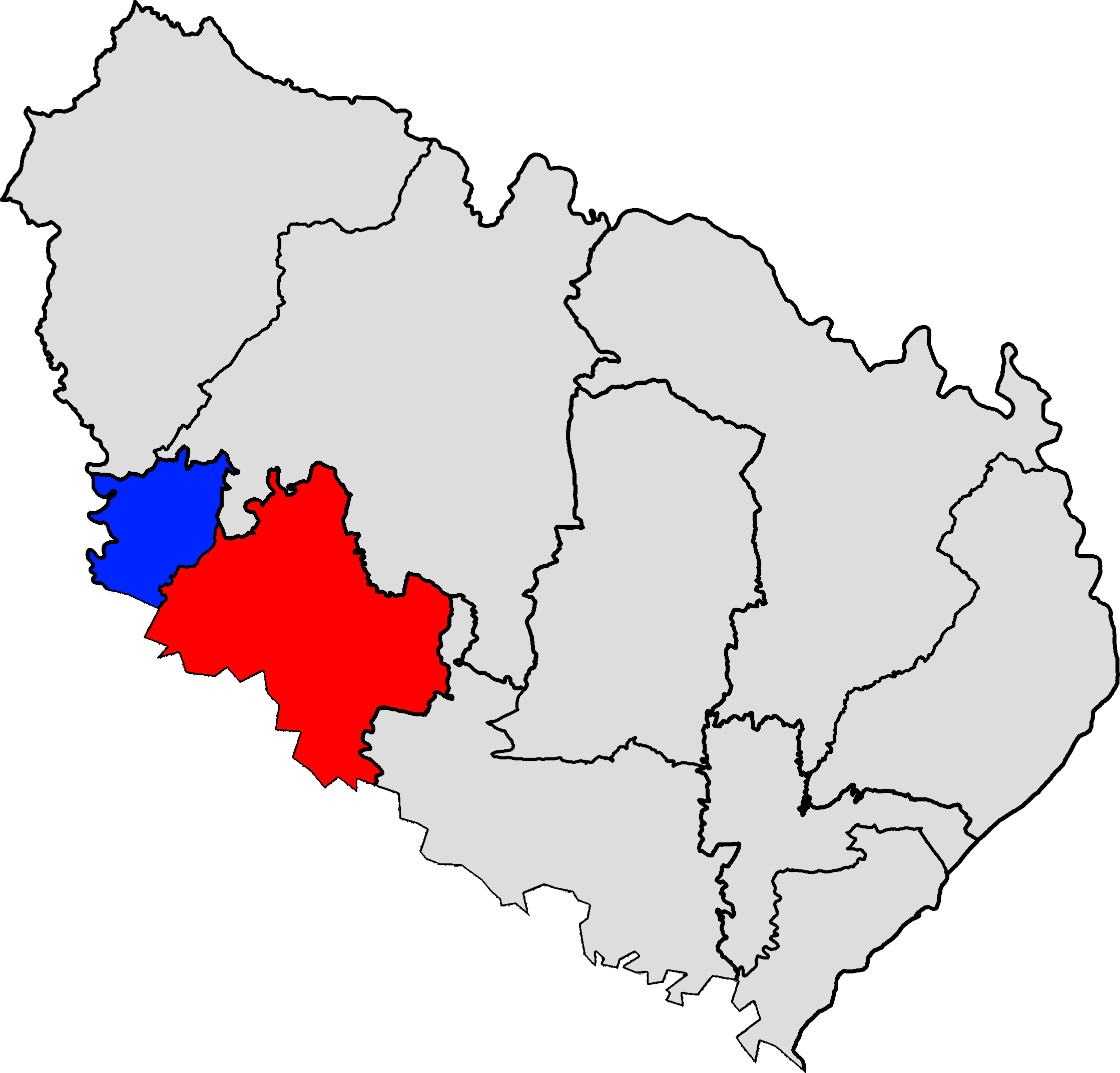
- Assembly segments Kailali 5(A) (red) and Kailali 5(B) within Kailali District
- Province: Sudurpashchim Province
- District: Kailali District
- Electorate: 110,539

Current constituency
- Created: 2008
- Party: Rastriya Swatantra Party
- MP: Ananda Bahadur Chand
- Sudurpashchim MPA 5(A): Nepalu Chaudhary (NCP)
- Sudurpashchim MPA 5(B): Dilli Raj Pant (NC)

Kailali 5 is one of five parliamentary constituencies of Kailali District in Nepal. This constituency came into existence on the Constituency Delimitation Commission (CDC) report submitted on 31 August 2017.

== Incorporated areas ==
Kailali 5 incorporates Dhangadhi Sub-metropolitan City and wards 6 and 9 of Kailari Rural Municipality.

== Assembly segments ==
It encompasses the following Sudurpashchim Provincial Assembly segment

- Kailali 5(A)
- Kailali 5(B)

== Members of Parliament ==
=== Parliament/Constituent Assembly ===
Election	Member	Party
2008	Lekh Raj Bhatta	CPN (Maoist)
January 2009	Lekh Raj Bhatta	UCPN (Maoist)
2013	Dirgha Raj Bhatta	Nepali Congress
2017	Narad Muni Rana	CPN (Unified Marxist–Leninist)
May 2019	Narad Muni Rana	Nepal Communist Party
March 2021	Narad Muni Rana	CPN (Unified Marxist–Leninist)
2022	Dilli Raj Pant	Nepali Congress
2026	Ananda Bahadur Chand	Rastriya Swatantra Party

=== Provincial Assembly ===
==== 5(A) ====
Election	Member	Party
2017	Nepalu Chaudhary	CPN (Unified Marxist–Leninist)
May 2018	Nepalu Chaudhary	Nepal Communist Party

==== 5(B) ====
Election	Member	Party
2017	Dilli Raj Pant	Nepali Congress

== Election results ==
=== Election in the 2020s ===
==== 2026 general election ====
Candidate	Party	Votes	%	+/–
Ananda Bahadur Chand	Rastriya Swatantra Party	31,953	51.42	▲45.91
Nara Narayan Shah	Nepali Congress	11,958	19.24	▼15.39
Prem Bahadur Ale	Nepali Communist Party	7,876	12.67	New entry
Yagya Raj Dhungana Upadhyay	CPN (UML)	5,839	9.40	▼23.50
Pyare Lal Rana	Independent	1,755	2.82	New entry
Roshan Shahi	Rastriya Prajatantra Party	1,592	2.56	
Others		1,174	1.89	
Total		62,147	100.00	–
Valid votes		62,147	94.52	
Invalid/blank votes		3,605	5.48	
Total votes		65,752	100.00	
Registered voters/turnout		110,539	59.48	
Majority		19,995		
Rastriya Swatantra Party gain				

==== 2022 general election ====
Candidate	Party	Votes	%
Dilli Raj Pant	Nepali Congress	21,392	34.63
Narad Muni Rana	CPN (UML)	20,318	32.90
Pushkar Nath Ojha	Independent	8,349	13.52
Jagadish Chaudhary	Independent	7,460	12.08
Ishwari Bista	Rastriya Swatantra Party	3,405	5.51
Others		842	1.36
Total		61,766	100.00
Majority		1,074	
Nepali Congress gain			

=== Election in the 2010s ===
==== 2017 legislative elections ====
Party	Candidate	Votes
CPN (Unified Marxist–Leninist)	Narad Muni Rana	27,202
Nepali Congress	Araju Rana Deuba	22,322
Rastriya Janata Party Nepal	Laxman Chaudhary	6,747
Bibeksheel Sajha Party	Dinesh Raj Bhandari	2,722
Others		621
Invalid votes		2,947
Result	CPN (UML) gain	
Source: Election Commission

==== 2017 Nepalese provincial elections ====
===== 5(A) =====
Party	Candidate	Votes
CPN (Unified Marxist–Leninist)	Nepalu Chaudhary	17,367
Nepali Congress	Jiwan Rana	11,073
Rastriya Janata Party Nepal	Jagannath Chaudhary	2,815
Bibeksheel Sajha Party	Narayan Chaudhary	1,308
Others		489
Invalid votes		1,471
Result	CPN (UML) gain	
Source: Election Commission

===== 5(B) =====
Party	Candidate	Votes
Nepali Congress	Dilli Raj Pant	11,253
CPN (Maoist Centre)	Ramesh Singh Dhami	9,484
Bibeksheel Sajha Party	Prakash Chand Bhatta	2,718
Rastriya Janata Party Nepal	Tika Devi Chaudhary	1,898
Others		1,442
Invalid votes		1,135
Result	Congress gain	
Source: Election Commission

===== 2013 Constituent Assembly election =====
Party	Candidate	Votes
Nepali Congress	Dirgha Raj Bhatta	16,346
UCPN (Maoist)	Lekh Raj Bhatta	9,334
CPN (Unified Marxist–Leninist)	Padam Singh Singhal	9,139
Tharuhat Terai Party Nepal	Madhav Chaudhary	1,674
Rastriya Prajatantra Party Nepal	Gajendra Bahdur Singh	1,555
Others		3,540
Result	Congress gain	
Source: NepalNews

=== Election in the 2000s ===
==== 2008 Constituent Assembly election ====
Party	Candidate	Votes
CPN (Maoist)	Lekh Raj Bhatta	17,979
Nepali Congress	Dirgha Raj Bhatta	13,638
CPN (Unified Marxist–Leninist)	Hari Shankar Yogi	7,597
Rastriya Prajatantra Party	Ganesh Khadka	1,342
Sanghiya Loktantrik Rastriya Manch	Bamshiram Chaudhary	1,006
Others		2,310
Invalid votes		1,983
Result	Maoist gain	
Source: Election Commission

== See also ==
- List of parliamentary constituencies of Nepal
