= Ministry of Agriculture and Livestock Development =

Government ministry of Nepal

- कृषि तथा पशुपंक्षी विकास मन्त्रालय
- Emblem of Nepal

Agency overview
- Formed: 1952
- Dissolved: 13 May 2026
- Superseding agency: Ministry of Agriculture, Forests and Environment
- Jurisdiction: Government of Nepal
- Headquarters: Singha Durbar, Kathmandu
- Minister responsible: Geeta Chaudhary (final), Cabinet Minister
- Agency executives: Dr. Deepak Kumar Kharel, Secretary (Agriculture Development); Dr. Rajendra Prasad Mishra, Secretary (Livestock Development)
- Website: www.moald.gov.np

The Ministry of Agriculture and Livestock Development was the governmental body of Nepal responsible for the growth and development of agriculture sector in the country. Local areas each have a District Agriculture Development Office (DADO). The Ministry of Agriculture and Livestock Development was the central apex body of Government of Nepal to look after the agriculture and allied fields.

On 13 May 2026, as part of an administrative overhaul by the Balen Shah administration to reduce the number of federal ministries from 22 to 18, this ministry was dissolved. Its functions were merged with the former Ministry of Forests and Environment to form the consolidated Ministry of Agriculture, Forests and Environment.

== History of the Ministry ==
The Government of Nepal established the early form of this ministry, the Department of Agriculture, in 1952, dissolving the Agricultural Council, which was the highest governing body until that time. In 1974, the department was developed into a ministry and the portfolio of Irrigation was included resulting in the Ministry of Agriculture and Irrigation. After further restructuring, the Ministry of Irrigation was formed separately. It was in 1991 that the Government decided to strengthen cooperatives throughout Nepal and between 1999 and 2001, the ministry was named the Ministry of Agriculture and Cooperative. When the portfolio of cooperatives was outsourced again, the ministry gained was known under the names of Ministry of Agriculture or Ministry of Agricultural Development depending on the current administration.In 2018, under the Second Oli cabinet, the portfolio of the ministry was enlarged and the portfolio of Land Management was added to the then Ministry of Agricultural Development and the portfolio of Cooperatives was returned to the ministry, while the Ministry of Land Reform and Management was discontinued. In August 2018, the ministry's portfolio was adjusted again, due to a cabinet expansion, the Ministry of Land Management, Cooperatives and Poverty Alleviation was reopened while the agriculture-related portfolio was changed to Ministry of Agriculture and Livestock Development.

== Organization ==
- Nepal Food Corporation
- Salt Trading Corporation
