= Geeta Chaudhary =

Nepalese politician

Gita Chaudhary

Minister of Agriculture, Forests and Environment
- Incumbent
- Assumed office 14 May 2026
- President: Ram Chandra Poudel
- Prime Minister: Balendra Shah
- Preceded by: Position established
Ministerial positions
Minister of Agriculture and Livestock Development
In office 27 March 2026 – 14 May 2026
President	Ram Chandra Poudel
Prime Minister	Balendra Shah
Preceded by	Madan Prasad Pariyar
Succeeded by	Ministry dissolved (succeeded by Ministry of Agriculture, Forests and Environment)
Minister of Forests and Environment
In office 27 March 2026 – 14 May 2026
Preceded by	Madhav Chaulagain
Succeeded by	Ministry dissolved (succeeded by Ministry of Agriculture, Forests and Environment)

Member of Parliament, Pratinidhi Sabha
- Incumbent
- Assumed office 26 March 2026
- Constituency: PR

Personal details
- Born: Shuklaphanta Municipality, Kanchanpur District, Nepal
- Party: Rastriya Swatantra Party
- Education: Nepal Law Campus (LLB, LLM)
- Profession: Lawyer; Social Activist; Politician

Gita Chaudhary is a Nepalese politician and lawyer serving as a minister of agriculture and livestock development and forests and environment under the prime minister, Balen Shah.

She is a member of parliament from the Rastriya Swatantra Party.

== Political career ==
Chaudhary was elected to the Pratinidhi Sabha from Rastriya Swatantra Party at the 2026 general election. She was elected from the party list under the Tharu female cluster.
