= Kamal Bahadur Shah cabinet =

Kamal Bahadur Shah cabinet may refer to:

- First Kamal Bahadur Shah cabinet
- Second Kamal Bahadur Shah cabinet
