= South Asian Association for Regional Cooperation =

Intergovernmental organization

(in other official languages)
Assamese	দক্ষিণ এছিয়াৰ আঞ্চলিক সহযোগিতাৰ সংঘ
Balochi	دکھنی ایشیائی علاقائی تعاون دا اتحاد
Bengali	দক্ষিণ এশিয়ার আঞ্চলিক সহযোগিতা সংস্থা
Dhivehi	ދެކުނު އޭޝިޔާގެ ސަރަޙައްދީ އެކުވެރިކަން ޖަމިއްޔާ
Dzongkha	ལྷོ་ཨེ་ཤེས་ཡའི་གནས་ཡུལ་མཉམ་འགྱུར་གyi་མཐུན་སྡེ
Persian	جنوب آسیا منطقه‌ای همکاری اتحاد
Gujarati	દક્ષિણ એશિયાઈ પ્રાદેશિક સહકાર સંઘ
Hindi	दक्षिण एशियाई क्षेत्रीय सहयोग संगठन
Kannada	ದಕ್ಷಿಣ ಏಷ್ಯಾದ ಪ್ರಾದೇಶಿಕ ಸಹಕಾರ ಸಂಘ
Kashmiri	جنوبی ایشیاہک علاقائی تعاون سنگتھ
Malayalam	തെക്കേ ഏഷ്യൻ പ്രാദേശിക സഹകരണ സംഘടന
Marathi	दक्षिण आशियाई प्रादेशिक सहकार संघटना
Nepali	दक्षिण एसियाली क्षेत्रीय सहयोग सङ्गठन
Odia	ଦକ୍ଷିଣ ଏସୀୟ ଆଞ୍ଚଳିକ ସହଯୋଗ ସଂସ୍ଥା
Punjabi	ਦੱਖਣੀ ਏਸ਼ੀਆਈ ਖੇਤਰੀ ਸਹਿਯੋਗ ਸੰਗਠਨ
Pashto	سویلي آسیا د سیمه‌ییزې همکارۍ اتحاد
Rajasthani	दक्षिण एशियाई क्षेत्रीय सहयोग संगठन
Sanskrit	दक्षिणाशियायाः प्रादेशिकसहकारसङ्घः
Sindhi	ڏکڻ ايشيائي علائقائي تعاون جو سنگھ
Sinhala	දකුණු ආසියානු කලාපීය සහයෝගිතා සංවිධානය
Tamil	தெற்கு ஆசிய பிராந்திய ஒத்துழைப்பு சங்கம்
Telugu	దక్షిణ ఆసియా ప్రాంతీయ సహకార సంఘం
Urdu	جنوبی ایشیائی علاقائی تعاون تنظیم
- Logo

- Location of the South Asian Association for Regional Cooperation (dark green) in Asia (dark grey)
- Headquarters: Kathmandu, Nepal; 28°10′N 84°15′E
- Largest city: Delhi, India; 28°36′50″N 77°12′32″E
- Working language: English
- Official languages of contracting states: 24 languages
- Religion (2025): 60.8% Hinduism; 30.5% Islam; 2.9% Buddhism; 1.9% Christianity; 1.3% Sikhism; 0.3% Jainism; 0.2% no religion; 0.05% Zoroastrianism; 0.05% Baháʼí Faith; 0.01% Judaism; 0.8% other
- Demonym: South Asian
- Type: Regional organisation
- Member states: 8 members: Afghanistan (Note: The flag of the Islamic Republic of Afghanistan is still used by SAARC, as the Taliban are not recognized as the rightful government of Afghanistan by SAARC; please see the SAARC website.); Bangladesh; Bhutan; India; Maldives; Nepal; Pakistan; Sri Lanka; 9 observers: Australia; China; European Union; Iran; Japan; Mauritius; Myanmar; South Korea; United States

Leaders
  - Secretary-General: Golam Sarwar
  - Chairmanship of SAARC: Bangladesh
- Legislature: None
- Establishment: 8 December 1985 (40 years ago)

Area
  - Total: 5,222,321 km^{2} (2,016,349 sq mi)
  - Water (%): 8

Population
  - 2026 estimate: ▲2,106,270,434(1st)
  - Density: 403.3/km^{2} (1,044.5/sq mi)
- GDP (PPP): 2026 estimate
  - Total: ▲$23.3 trillion (3rd)
  - Per capita: ▲$11,058 (127th)
- GDP (nominal): 2026 estimate
  - Total: ▲$5.30 trillion (4th)
  - Per capita: ▲$2,517 (152nd)
- HDI (2023): ▲0.663 medium (137th)
- Currency: 8 currencies: Afghan afghani (؋) (AFN); Bangladeshi taka (৳) (BDT); Bhutanese ngultrum (Nu.) (BTN); Indian rupee (₹) (INR); Maldivian rufiyaa (.ރ) (MVR); Nepalese rupee (रु) (NPR); Pakistani rupee (₨) (PKR); Sri Lankan rupee (රු) (LKR)
- Time zone: UTC+4:30 to +6:00 (AFT, PST, MVT, IST, SLST, NPT, BST, BTT)
- Calling code: 8 codes: Bangladesh +880; India +91; Pakistan +92; Afghanistan +93; Sri Lanka +94; Maldives +960; Bhutan +975; Nepal +977
- Internet TLD: 8 ccTLDs: .af; .bd; .bt; .in; .lk; .mv; .np; .pk
- Website saarc-sec.org

The South Asian Association for Regional Cooperation (SAARC) is an intergovernmental organization comprising eight sovereign states with full membership: Afghanistan, Bangladesh, Bhutan, India, Maldives, Nepal, Pakistan, and Sri Lanka. It also includes nine non-member observers: Australia, China, the European Union, Iran, Japan, Mauritius, Myanmar, South Korea, and the United States. As of 2021, SAARC members collectively account for about 21% of the world's population and 5.21% (US$4.47 trillion) of the global economy.

The organization was founded in Dhaka, Bangladesh, on 8 December 1985 and is currently headquartered in Kathmandu, Nepal. SAARC has promoted economic development and regional integration, including through the South Asian Free Trade Area since 2006. It maintains a permanent diplomatic presence at the United Nations as an observer and has developed similar links with the European Union.

As of 2026, SAARC summits have not been held since the 18th summit in Nepal in November 2014. Although the 19th summit in Pakistan was scheduled to take place in November 2016, it was indefinitely postponed following the withdrawal of India and several other member states due to the Uri attack by the Pakistani militant group Jaish-e-Mohammed; India currently cooperates with its eastern neighbours through BIMSTEC, while Bangladesh has sought to revive the organisation alongside pursuing membership status with ASEAN.

== Historical background ==
The idea of co-operation among South Asian countries was discussed in three conferences: the Asian Relations Conference held in New Delhi in April 1947; the Baguio Conference in the Philippines in May 1950; and the Colombo Powers Conference held in Sri Lanka in April 1954.

A clickable Euler diagram showing the relationships between various Asian regional organizations

In the ending years of the 1970s, the seven South Asian nations – Bangladesh, Bhutan, India, the Maldives, Nepal, Pakistan, and Sri Lanka – agreed upon the creation of a trade bloc and to provide a platform for the people of South Asia to work together in a spirit of friendship, trust, and understanding. For Bangladesh, a prime reason for proposing this regional cooperation framework was the failure of its attempt to join ASEAN. Seeking to replicate the successes of ASEAN and a way to legitimise his government, President Ziaur Rahman of Bangladesh later wrote official letters to the leaders of the countries of South Asia, presenting his vision for the future of the region and compelling arguments for co-operation.

During his visit to India in December 1977, Rahman discussed the issue of regional cooperation with the Indian Prime Minister, Morarji Desai. In the inaugural speech to the Colombo Plan Consultative Committee which met in Kathmandu also in 1977, King Birendra of Nepal gave a call for close regional cooperation among South Asian countries in sharing river waters.

After the USSR's intervention in Afghanistan, efforts to establish the union were accelerated in 1979 amid the resulting rapid deterioration of the South Asian security situation. Responding to Rahman and Birendra's convention, officials of the foreign ministries of the seven countries met for the first time in Colombo in April 1981. The Bangladeshi proposal was promptly endorsed by Nepal, Sri Lanka, Bhutan, and Maldives; however India and Pakistan were sceptical initially. The Indian concern was the proposal's reference to the security matters in South Asia and fear that Rahman's proposal for a regional organisation might provide an opportunity for new smaller neighbours to re-internationalise all bilateral issues and to join with each other to form an opposition against India. Pakistan assumed that it might be an Indian strategy to organise the other South Asian countries against Pakistan and ensure a regional market for Indian products, thereby consolidating and further strengthening India's economic dominance in the region.

However, after a series of diplomatic consultations headed by Bangladesh between South Asian UN representatives at the UN headquarters in New York, from September 1979 to 1980, it was agreed that Bangladesh would prepare the draft of a working paper for discussion among the foreign secretaries of South Asian countries. The foreign secretaries of the inner seven countries again delegated a Committee of the Whole in Colombo in September 1981, which identified five broad areas for regional cooperation. New areas of co-operation were added in the following years.

In 1983, at the international conference held in Dhaka by its Ministry of Foreign Affairs, the foreign ministers of the inner seven countries adopted the Declaration on South Asian Association for Regional Cooperation (SAARC) and formally launched the Integrated Programme of Action (IPA) initially in five agreed areas of cooperation, namely, Agriculture; Rural Development; Telecommunications; Meteorology; and Health and Population Activities.

Officially, the union was established in Dhaka with Kathmandu being the union's secretariat-general. The first SAARC summit was held in Dhaka on 7–8 December 1985 and hosted by the President of Bangladesh Hussain Ershad. The declaration was signed by, namely, King of Bhutan Jigme Singye Wangchuk; President of Pakistan Zia-ul-Haq; Prime Minister of India Rajiv Gandhi; King of Nepal Birendra Shah; President of Sri Lanka JR Jayewardene; and President of Maldives Maumoon Gayoom.

== Members and observers ==
=== Members ===
The member states are Afghanistan, Bangladesh, Bhutan, India, the Maldives, Nepal, Pakistan, and Sri Lanka.

SAARC was founded by seven states in 1985. In 2005, Afghanistan began negotiating their accession to SAARC and formally applied for membership in the same year. The issue of Afghanistan joining SAARC generated a great deal of debate in each member state, including concerns about the definition of South Asian identity because Afghanistan is considered a Central Asian country, while it is neither accepted as a Middle Eastern country, nor as a Central Asian country, or as part of the Indian subcontinent, other than being only in part of South Asia.

SAARC member states imposed a stipulation for Afghanistan to hold a general election; the non-partisan elections were held in late 2005. Despite initial reluctance and internal debates, Afghanistan joined SAARC as its eighth member state in April 2007.

Despite the takeover of Afghanistan by the Taliban in 2021, Afghanistan is still a member of SAARC, despite calls for their suspension and none of the other SAARC members recognizing the Taliban government. The issue was further exasperated as it was Afghanistan's turn to select a Secretary General for SAARC in 2023. All other members decided to skip Afghanistan and award the selection to Bangladesh, with Nepali foreign secretary, Bharat Raj Paudyal, stating that "When the term of the Bangladeshi secretary general ends, if the problems in Afghanistan are resolved, the new secretary general will be from Afghanistan, not from Bhutan."

Economic data in table below is sourced from the International Monetary Fund, current as of November 2024 unless stated otherwise, and is given in US dollars.

Country	Population (2024)	GDP (nominal) [US$ million, 2024]	GDP (PPP) [US$ million, 2024]	GDP per capita (Nominal)	GDP per capita (PPP)	GDP growth rate (2024)	Exports (US$ million, 2024 or earlier)	Foreign direct investment (US$ million, 2023)	Foreign exchange reserves (US$ million)	Defence budget (US$ million)	Literacy rate (above age 15)	Life expectancy	Population below poverty line	Primary school enrolment	Secondary school enrollment	Population undernourished (%)	Human Development Index	Democracy Index	Global Terrorism Index
Afghanistan	42,647,492	$14,467	$72,512	$411	$2,116		$1,476	$20.6	$443	$1,100	37.3%	63.67	42%	88%	54%	28.5%	0.462 (182)	0.26 (167)	9.233 (1)
Bangladesh	173,562,364	$451,468	$1,690,000	$2,825	$9,876	5.4%	$60,138	$1,385.16	$25,500	$5,200	75.2%	73.10	24.3%	98%	79%	15.1%	0.670 (129)	5.87 (75)	0 (124)
Bhutan	791,524	$3,110	$12,980	$4,068	$16,754	5.2%	$791	$11.92	$972	$7.3	66.6%	70.20	12%	97%	78%	8.7%	0.681 (125)	5.54 (81)	0.305 (107)
India	1,450,935,791	$3,889,130	$16,024,460	$2,698	$11,112	7.0%	$773,223	$28,070.21	$675,653	$81,400	77.7%	70.1	21.9%	97%	75%	14.2%	0.644 (134)	7.18 (41)	4.222 (11)
Maldives	527,799	$7,199	$13,870	$17,287	$34,322	4.7%	$5,096	$761.52	$588	$55	97%	77.34	16%	97%	N/A	3.1%	0.762 (87)	N/A	N/A
Nepal	29,651,054	$43,673	$169,120	$1,381	$5,348	3.1%	$2,722	$73.83	$18,400	$400	67.9%	70.25	13.4%	97%	67%	11.2%	0.601 (146)	4.6 (98)	4.791 (32)
Pakistan	251,269,164	$374,595	$1,580,000	$1,588	$6,715	2.4%	$38,700	$1,818	$15,965	$11,000	58%	66.48	24.3%	92%	34%	18.3%	0.540 (164)	3.25 (118)	10 (10)
Sri Lanka	21,916,000	$74,846	$319,248	$3,330	$14,255		$13,082	$711.83	$6,467	$2,000	92.2%	75.28	6.7%	99%	77%	9.8%	0.780 (79)	6.17 (70)	4.077 (42)

Membership in other bodies
Country	G20	BRICS	BIMSTEC	IORA	APTA	BBIN	SASEC	AIIB	ACU	ACD	ADB	World Bank
Afghanistan	No	No	No	No	No	No	No	No	No	Yes	Yes	Yes
Bangladesh	No	No	Yes	Yes	Yes	Yes	Yes	Yes	Yes	Yes	Yes	Yes
Bhutan	No	No	Yes	No	No	Yes	Yes	No	Yes	Yes	Yes	Yes
India	Yes	Yes	Yes	Yes	Yes	Yes	Yes	Yes	Yes	Yes	Yes	Yes
Maldives	No	No	No	No	No	No	Yes	Yes	Yes	No	Yes	Yes
Nepal	No	No	Yes	No	No	Yes	Yes	Yes	Yes	Yes	Yes	Yes
Pakistan	No	No	No	No	No	No	No	Yes	Yes	Yes	Yes	Yes
Sri Lanka	No	No	Yes	Yes	Yes	No	Yes	Yes	Yes	Yes	Yes	Yes

=== Observer countries ===
States with observer status include Australia, China, the European Union, Iran, Japan, Mauritius, Myanmar, South Korea, and the United States.

China's 2007 application for observer status received strong support from Bangladesh, Sri Lanka, Maldives, Nepal, and Pakistan. Other South Asian members of SAARC agreed to support China's observer status, but were not as strongly in favor.

On 2 August 2006, the foreign ministers of SAARC countries agreed in principle to grant observer status to three applicants; the US and South Korea (both made requests in April 2006), as well as the European Union (requested in July 2006). On 4 March 2007, Iran requested observer status, followed shortly by Mauritius.

=== Potential future members ===
Myanmar has expressed interest in upgrading its status from an observer to a full member of SAARC. China has requested joining SAARC. Russia has applied for observer status membership of SAARC. Turkey applied for observer status membership of SAARC in 2012. South Africa has participated in meetings. Indonesia, Jordan, Canada, New Zealand, Ireland, Saudi Arabia, the United Kingdom and Yemen have expressed interest.

== Secretariat ==
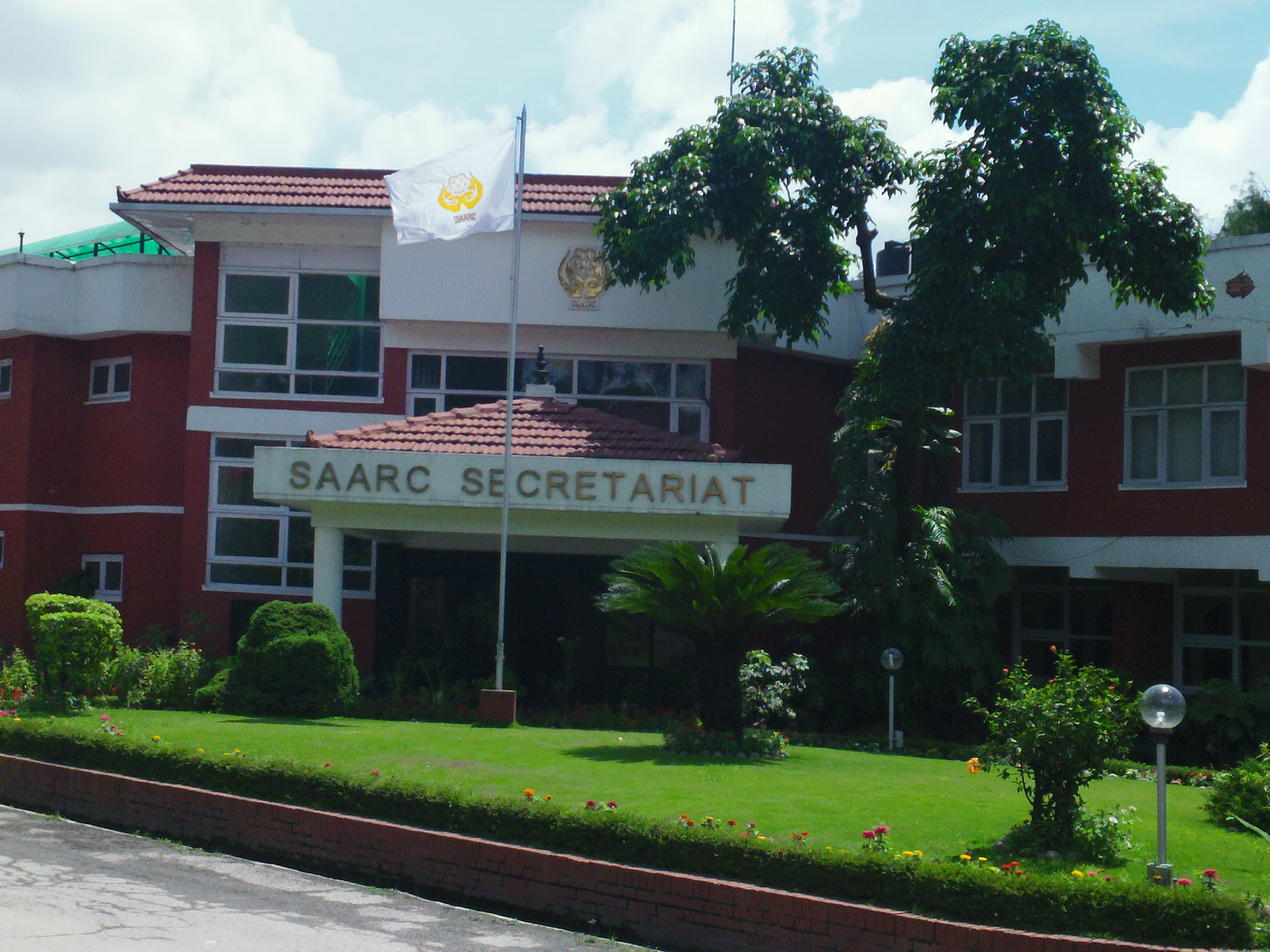
Secretariat of the South Asian Association for Regional Cooperation in Kathmandu, Nepal

The SAARC Secretariat was established in Kathmandu on 16 January 1987 and was inaugurated by the late King Birendra Bir Bikram Shah of Nepal.

=== Specialized bodies ===
SAARC member states have established the following specialized bodies within the organization, which have distinct mandates and structures that differ from the regional centres. These bodies are managed by their respective governing boards, composed of representatives from all member states, the representative of H.E. Secretary-General of SAARC, and the Ministry of Foreign/External Affairs of the host government. The heads of these bodies serve as the member secretaries to the governing board, which reports to the Programming Committee of SAARC.

Specialized Body	Location	Country	Website
SAARC Arbitration Council (SARCO)	Islamabad	Pakistan	www.sarco-sec.org
SAARC Development Fund (SDF)	Thimphu	Bhutan	www.sdfsec.org
South Asian University (SAU)	New Delhi	India	www.sau.int
South Asian Regional Standards Organization (SARSO)	Dhaka	Bangladesh	www.sarso.org.bd

=== Regional Centres ===
The SAARC Secretariat is supported by following Regional Centres established in the Member States to promote regional co-operation. These Centres are managed by Governing Boards comprising representatives from all the Member States, SAARC Secretary-General and the Ministry of Foreign/External Affairs of the Host Government. The Director of the Centre acts as Member Secretary to the Governing Board which reports to the Programming Committee. After 31 December 2015, there 6 regional centres were stopped by unanimous decision. These are SMRC, SFC, SDC, SCZMC, SIC, SHRDC.

Regional Centre	Location	Country	Website
SAARC Agriculture Centre (SAC)	Dhaka	Bangladesh	www.sac.org.bd/
SAARC Meteorological Research Centre (SMRC)	Dhaka	Bangladesh	
SAARC Forestry Centre (SFC)	Thimphu	Bhutan	
SAARC Documentation Centre (SDC)	New Delhi	India	
SAARC Disaster Management Centre (SDMC)	Gandhinagar	India	saarc-sdmc.org/
SAARC Coastal Zone Management Centre (SCZMC)	Malé	Maldives	
SAARC Information Centre (SIC)	Kathmandu	Nepal	
SAARC Tuberculosis and HIV/AIDS Centre (STAC)	Bhaktapur	Nepal	www.saarctb.org/
SAARC Human Resources Development Centre (SHRDC)	Islamabad	Pakistan	
SAARC Energy Centre (SEC)	Islamabad	Pakistan	www.saarcenergy.org/
SAARC Cultural Centre (SCC)	Colombo	Sri Lanka	www.saarcculture.org/

=== Anthem ===
SAARC does not have an official anthem as yet like some other regional organizations (e.g. ASEAN).

== Apex and Recognized Bodies ==
SAARC has six Apex Bodies, they are:

- SAARC Chamber of Commerce & Industry (SCCI),
- South Asian Association for Regional Cooperation in Law (SAARCLAW),
- South Asian Federation of Accountants (SAFA),
- South Asia Foundation (SAF),
- South Asia Initiative to End Violence Against Children (SAIEVAC),
- Foundation of SAARC Writers and Literature (FOSWAL)

SAARC also has about 18 recognized bodies.

== SAARC Disaster Management Centre ==
The South Asian Association of Regional Cooperation (SAARC) Disaster Management Centre (SDMC-IU) is an organization at Gujarat Institute of Disaster Management (GIDM) Campus, Gandhinagar, Gujarat, India. Eight Member States, i.e., Afghanistan, Bangladesh, Bhutan, India, Maldives, Nepal, Pakistan and Sri Lanka are expected to be served by the SDMC (IU). The organization provides policy advice, technical support on system development, capacity building services and training for holistic management of disaster risk in the SAARC region.

== Political issues ==
Lasting peace and prosperity in South Asia has been elusive because of the various ongoing conflicts in the region. Political dialogue is often conducted on the margins of SAARC meetings which have refrained from interfering in the internal matters of its member states. During the 12th and 13th SAARC summits, extreme emphasis was laid upon greater cooperation between SAARC members to fight terrorism.

The 19th SAARC summit scheduled to be held in Pakistan was called off as India, Bangladesh, Bhutan and Afghanistan decided to boycott it due to a terrorist attack on an army camp in Uri. It was the first time that four countries boycotted a SAARC summit, leading to its cancellation.

The failure of SAARC can also be attributed to conflicts among some of its members. Pakistan would “indirectly target” India at summits, and “try to get the other members to gang up against Delhi,” a retired Sri Lankan foreign secretary told The Diplomat in 2019. India, for its part, continued to emphasize its concerns over terrorism linked to Pakistan, which it regarded as a bilateral matter and therefore not appropriate for discussion in multilateral settings.

SAARC has faced persistent challenges related to terrorism, including cross-border militancy and allegations of state-sponsored extremism, over several decades. In this context, terrorism has come to symbolize the organization's stagnation, exacerbating existing divisions among member states. According to global and regional terrorism analysts, terrorism in South Asia manifests in various forms—such as state-supported militancy, extremist groups with alleged state backing, separatist movements, and transnational extremist networks—contributing to broader regional instability. The 2016 Uri attack significantly impacted bilateral diplomatic relations and further hindered regional cooperation efforts within SAARC.

Following political changes in Bangladesh, Dr. Muhammad Yunus, who served as the chief adviser to the interim government in Bangladesh, had publicly expressed interest in revitalizing the South Asian Association for Regional Cooperation (SAARC) on multiple occasions. However, some policymakers in India viewed Bangladesh's initiative with skepticism. India’s External Affairs Minister, S. Jaishankar, reportedly indicated that Bangladesh was “batting for Pakistan” by attempting to revive SAARC. During a bilateral meeting between Bangladesh’s Foreign Affairs Adviser Towhid Hossain and External Affairs Minister Jaishankar in Muscat, Oman, on 16 February, India issued a strong statement on terrorism. According to the Ministry of External Affairs (MEA), Jaishankar urged Bangladesh “to stop batting for Pakistan and normalising terrorism” through efforts to resume SAARC’s activities. MEA spokesperson Randhir Jaiswal, speaking at a press briefing, stated: “Everyone in South Asia is aware of which country and what activities are responsible for stymieing SAARC. EAM conveyed that it is important that Bangladesh should not normalise terrorism.” While Pakistan was not named directly, the remarks were widely interpreted as referring to its alleged role in undermining regional cooperation.

Dr. Minendra Rijal, former Defence Minister of Nepal, stated that Pakistan’s support for terrorism has contributed to the stagnation of SAARC, obstructed regional economic integration, and resulted in substantial economic losses for Pakistan.

China too has been trying to undermine the SAARC grouping and has been suggesting alternatives for the same. Analysts in New Delhi have expressed little surprise at the proposed initiative by China and Pakistan for regional cooperation in South Asia. According to a research fellow at the Manohar Parrikar Institute for Defence Studies and Analyses, China has sought to promote alternative regional frameworks since its proposal to join SAARC was rejected in 2005. Over the past two decades, it has launched several mechanisms for regional engagement, including the China-South Asia Cooperation Forum in 2006, the Belt and Road Initiative (BRI) Trans-Himalayan Connectivity Network in 2018—which includes Pakistan, Afghanistan, and Nepal—and the China-South Asian Countries Poverty Alleviation and Cooperative Development Centre in 2021.All South Asian countries, except India and Bhutan, are members of the BRI. As such, the latest proposal for regional cooperation is seen as part of China's continued efforts to build alternatives to SAARC.

SAARC has generally been ineffective at achieving enhanced regionalism.

== South Asian Free Trade Area ==
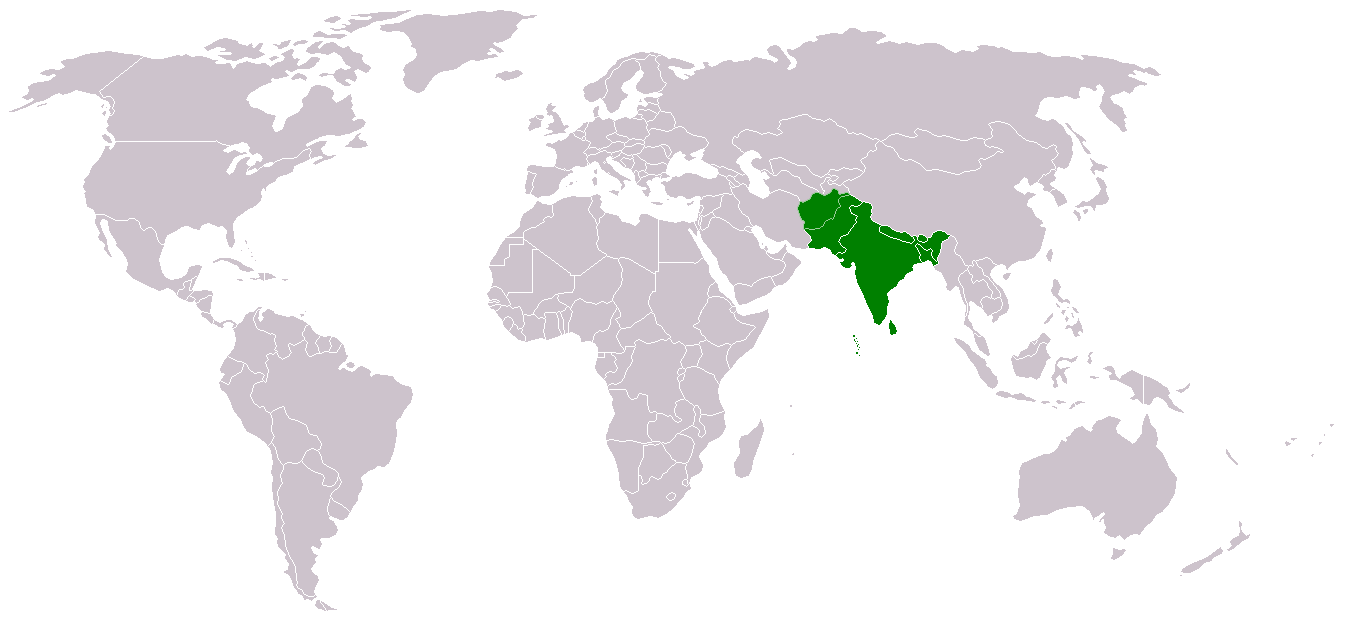
Countries under the South Asian Free Trade Area

The SAFTA was envisaged primarily as the first step towards the transition to a South Asian Free Trade Area (SAFTA) leading subsequently towards a Customs Union, Common Market and the Economic Union. In 1995, Sixteenth session of the Council of Ministers (New Delhi, 18–19 December 1995) agreed on the need to strive for the realization of SAFTA and to this end, an Inter-Governmental Expert Group (IGEG) was set up in 1996 to identify the necessary steps for progressing to a free trade area. The Tenth SAARC Summit (Colombo, 29–31 July 1998) decided to set up a Committee of Experts (COE) to draft a comprehensive treaty framework for creating a free trade area within the region, taking into consideration the asymmetries in development within the region and bearing in mind the need to fix realistic and achievable targets.

The SAFTA Agreement was signed on 6 January 2004 during Twelfth SAARC Summit held in Islamabad, Pakistan. The Agreement entered into force on 1 January 2006, and the Trade Liberalization Programme commenced from 1 July 2006. Under this agreement, SAARC members will bring their duties down to 20 percent by 2009. Following the Agreement coming into force the SAFTA Ministerial Council (SMC) has been established comprising the Commerce Ministers of the Member States. In 2012 SAARC exports increased substantially to $354.6 billion from $206.7 billion in 2009. Imports too increased from $330 billion to $602 billion over the same period. But the intra-SAARC trade amounts to just a little over 1% of SAARC's GDP. In contrast to SAARC, in ASEAN (which is actually smaller than SAARC in terms of the size of the economy) the intra-bloc trade stands at 10% of its GDP.

The SAFTA was envisaged to gradually move towards the South Asian Economic Union, but the current intra-regional trade and investment relation are not encouraging and it may be difficult to achieve this target. SAARC intra-regional trade stands at just five percent on the share of intra-regional trade in overall trade in South Asia. Similarly, foreign direct investment is also dismal. The intra-regional FDI flow stands at around four percent of the total foreign investment.

The Asian Development Bank has estimated that inter-regional trade in SAARC region possessed the potential of shooting up agricultural exports by $14 billion per year from existing level of $8 billion to $22 billion. The study by Asian Development Bank states that against the potential average SAARC intra-regional trade of $22 billion per year, the actual trade in South Asia has been only around $8 billion. The uncaptured potential for intra-regional trade is therefore $14 billion per year, i.e., 68%.

== SAARC Visa Exemption Scheme ==
The SAARC Visa Exemption Scheme was launched in 1992. The leaders at the Fourth Summit (Islamabad, 29–31 December 1988), realizing the importance of people-to-people contact among SAARC countries, decided that certain categories of dignitaries should be entitled to a Special Travel document. The document would exempt them from visas within the region. As directed by the Summit, the Council of Ministers regularly kept under review the list of entitled categories.

Currently, the list included 24 categories of entitled persons, which include dignitaries, judges of higher courts, parliamentarians, senior officials, entrepreneurs, journalists, and athletes.

The Visa Stickers are issued by the respective Member States to the entitled categories of that particular country. The validity of the Visa Sticker is generally for one year. The implementation is reviewed regularly by the Immigration Authorities of SAARC Member States.

== Awards ==
=== SAARC Award ===
The Twelfth (12th) Summit approved the SAARC Award to support individuals and organizations within the region. The main aims of the SAARC Award are:

- To encourage individuals and organizations based in South Asia to undertake programmes and activities that complement the efforts of SAARC.
- To encourage individuals and organizations in South Asia contributing to bettering the conditions of women and children.
- To honour outstanding contributions and achievements of individuals and organizations within the region in the fields of peace, development, poverty alleviation, environmental protection, and regional cooperation.
- To honour any other contributions and achievement not covered above of individuals and organizations in the region.

The SAARC Award consists of a gold medal, a letter of citation, and cash prize of $25,000. Since the institution of the SAARC Award in 2004, it has been awarded only once and the Award was posthumously conferred upon the late President Ziaur Rahman of Bangladesh.

=== SAARC Literary Award ===
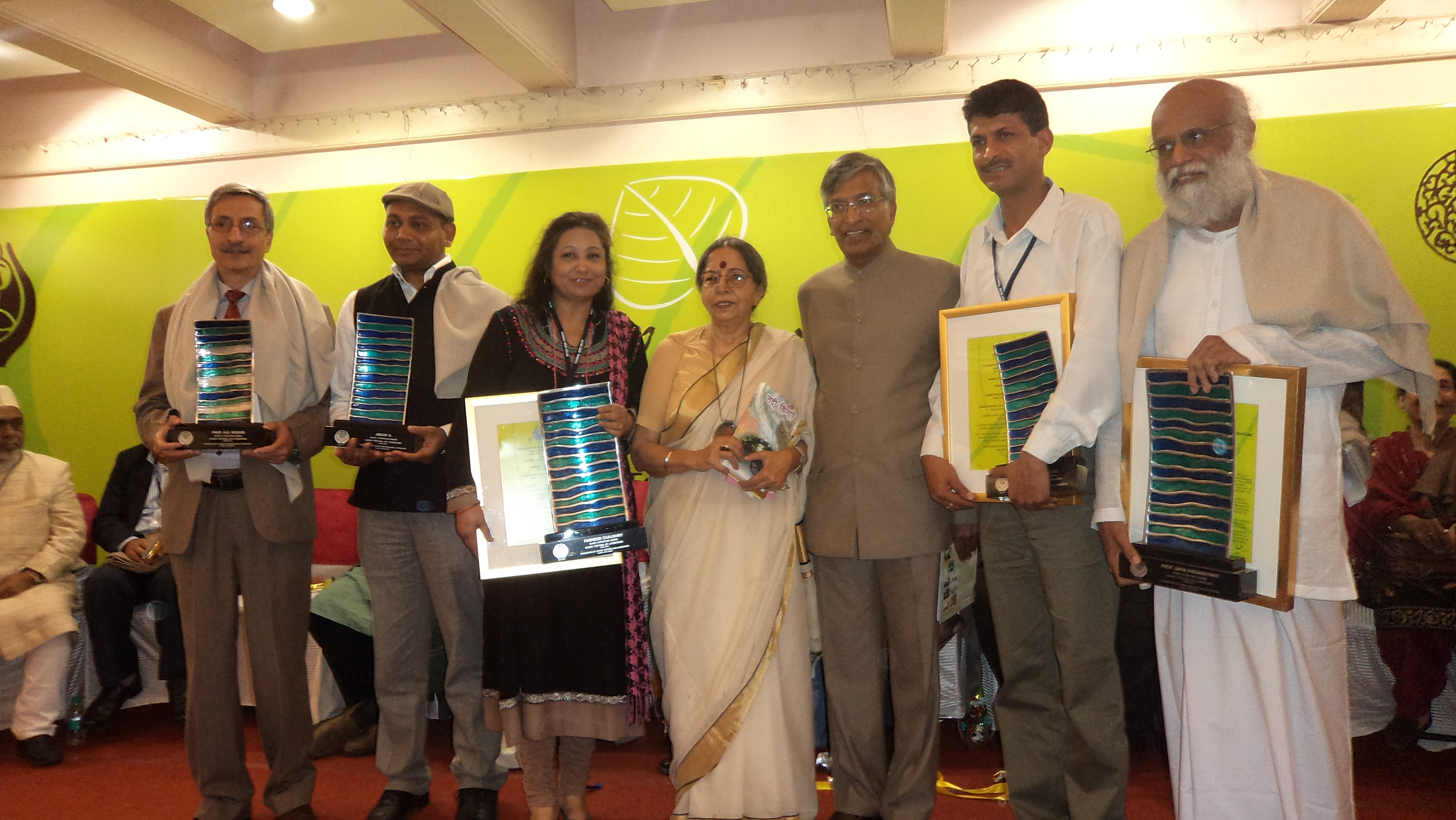
Recipients of SAARC Literary Award 2013

The SAARC Literary Award is an annual award conferred by the Foundation of SAARC Writers and Literature (FOSWAL) since 2001 which is an apex SAARC body. Some of the prominent recipients of this award include Shamshur Rahman, Mahasweta Devi, Jayanta Mahapatra, Abhi Subedi, Mark Tully, Sitakant Mahapatra, Uday Prakash, Suman Pokhrel, and Abhay K.

Nepali poet, lyricist, and translator Suman Pokhrel is the only poet/writer to be awarded twice.

=== SAARC Youth Award ===
The SAARC Youth Award is awarded to outstanding individuals from the SAARC region. The award is notable because of the recognition it gives to the Award winner in the SAARC region. The award is based on specific themes which apply to each year. The award recognizes and promotes the commitment and talent of the youth who give back to the world at large through various initiatives such as Inventions, Protection of the Environment and Disaster relief. The recipients who receive this award are ones who have dedicated their lives to their individual causes to improve situations in their own countries as well as paving a path for the SAARC region to follow. The Committee for the SAARC Youth Award selects the best candidate based on his/her merits and their decision is final.

Previous Winners:

- 1992: World Population Issue and Welfare - Painting; - Devang Soparkar (India)
- 1997: Outstanding Social Service in Community Welfare – Sukur Salek (Bangladesh)
- 1998: New Inventions and Shanu — Najmul Hasnain Shah (Pakistan)
- 2001: Creative Photography: South Asian Diversity – Mushfiqul Alam (Bangladesh)
- 2002: Outstanding contribution to protect the Environment – Masil Khan (Pakistan)
- 2003: Invention in the Field of Traditional Medicine – Hassan Sher (Pakistan)
- 2004: Outstanding contribution to raising awareness of TB and/or HIV/AIDS – Ajij Prasad Poudyal (Nepal)
- 2006: Promotion of Tourism in South Asia – Syed Zafar Abbas Naqvi (Pakistan)
- 2008: Protecting the Environment in South Asia – Deepani Jayantha (Sri Lanka)
- 2009: Outstanding contribution to humanitarian works in the aftermath of Natural Disasters – Ravikant Singh (India)
- 2010: Outstanding contribution for the Protection of Environment and mitigation of Climate Change – Anoka Primrose Abeyrathne (Sri Lanka)
- 2011: Youth leadership in the fight against social ills - Mr. Mohamed Faseen Rafiu (The Maldives)

== Secretaries-General of SAARC ==
Secretary General of the South Asian Association for Regional Cooperation
#	Name	Country	Took office	Left office
1	Abul Ahsan	Bangladesh	16 January 1985	15 October 1989
2	Kant Kishore Bhargava	India	17 October 1989	31 December 1991
3	Ibrahim Hussain Zaki	Maldives	1 January 1992	31 December 1993
4	Yadav Kant Silwal	Nepal	1 January 1994	31 December 1995
5	Naeem U. Hasan	Pakistan	1 January 1996	31 December 1998
6	Nihal Rodrigo	Sri Lanka	1 January 1999	10 January 2002
7	Q. A. M. A. Rahim	Bangladesh	11 January 2002	28 February 2005
8	Chenkyab Dorji	Bhutan	1 March 2005	29 February 2008
9	Sheel Kant Sharma	India	1 March 2008	28 February 2011
10	Fathimath Dhiyana Saeed	Maldives	1 March 2011	11 March 2012
11	Ahmed Saleem	Maldives	12 March 2012	28 February 2014
12	Arjun Bahadur Thapa	Nepal	1 March 2014	28 February 2017
13	Amjad Hussain B. Sial	Pakistan	1 March 2017	29 February 2020
14	Esala Ruwan Weerakoon	Sri Lanka	1 March 2020	3 March 2023
15	Golam Sarwar	Bangladesh	4 March 2023	Incumbent

== SAARC summits ==
No	Date	Country	Host	Host leader
1st	7–8 December 1985	Bangladesh	Dhaka	Ataur Rahman Khan
2nd	16–17 November 1986	India	Bengaluru	Rajiv Gandhi
3rd	2–4 November 1987	Nepal	Kathmandu	King Birendra Bir Bikram Shah
4th	29–31 December 1988	Pakistan	Islamabad	Benazir Bhutto
5th	21–23 November 1990	Maldives	Malé	Maumoon Abdul Gayoom
6th	21 December 1991	Sri Lanka	Colombo	Ranasinghe Premadasa
7th	10–11 April 1993	Bangladesh	Dhaka	Khaleda Zia
8th	2–4 May 1995	India	New Delhi	P V Narasimha Rao
9th	12–14 May 1997	Maldives	Malé	Maumoon Abdul Gayoom
10th	29–31 July 1998	Sri Lanka	Colombo	Chandrika Kumaratunga
11th	4–6 January 2002	Nepal	Kathmandu	Sher Bahadur Deuba
12th	2–6 January 2004	Pakistan	Islamabad	Zafarullah Khan Jamali
13th	12–13 November 2005	Bangladesh	Dhaka	Khaleda Zia
14th	3–4 April 2007	India	New Delhi	Manmohan Singh
15th	1–3 August 2008	Sri Lanka	Colombo	Mahinda Rajapaksa
16th	28–29 April 2010	Bhutan	Thimphu	Jigme Thinley
17th	10–11 November 2011	Maldives	Addu	Mohammed Nasheed
18th	26–27 November 2014	Nepal	Kathmandu	Sushil Koirala
19th	15–16 November 2016	Pakistan	Islamabad	Cancelled

== Current leaders of SAARC ==
Leaders are the constitutional chief executive of the nation's government.

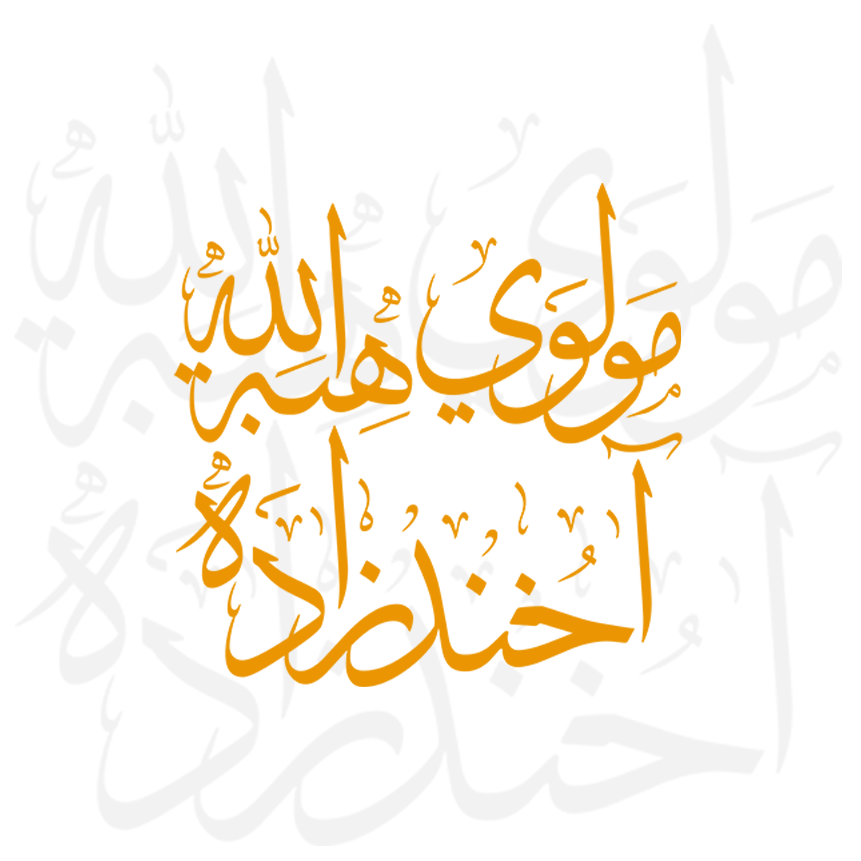
Afghanistan
Hibatullah Akhundzada
Supreme Leader of Afghanistan
(de facto)

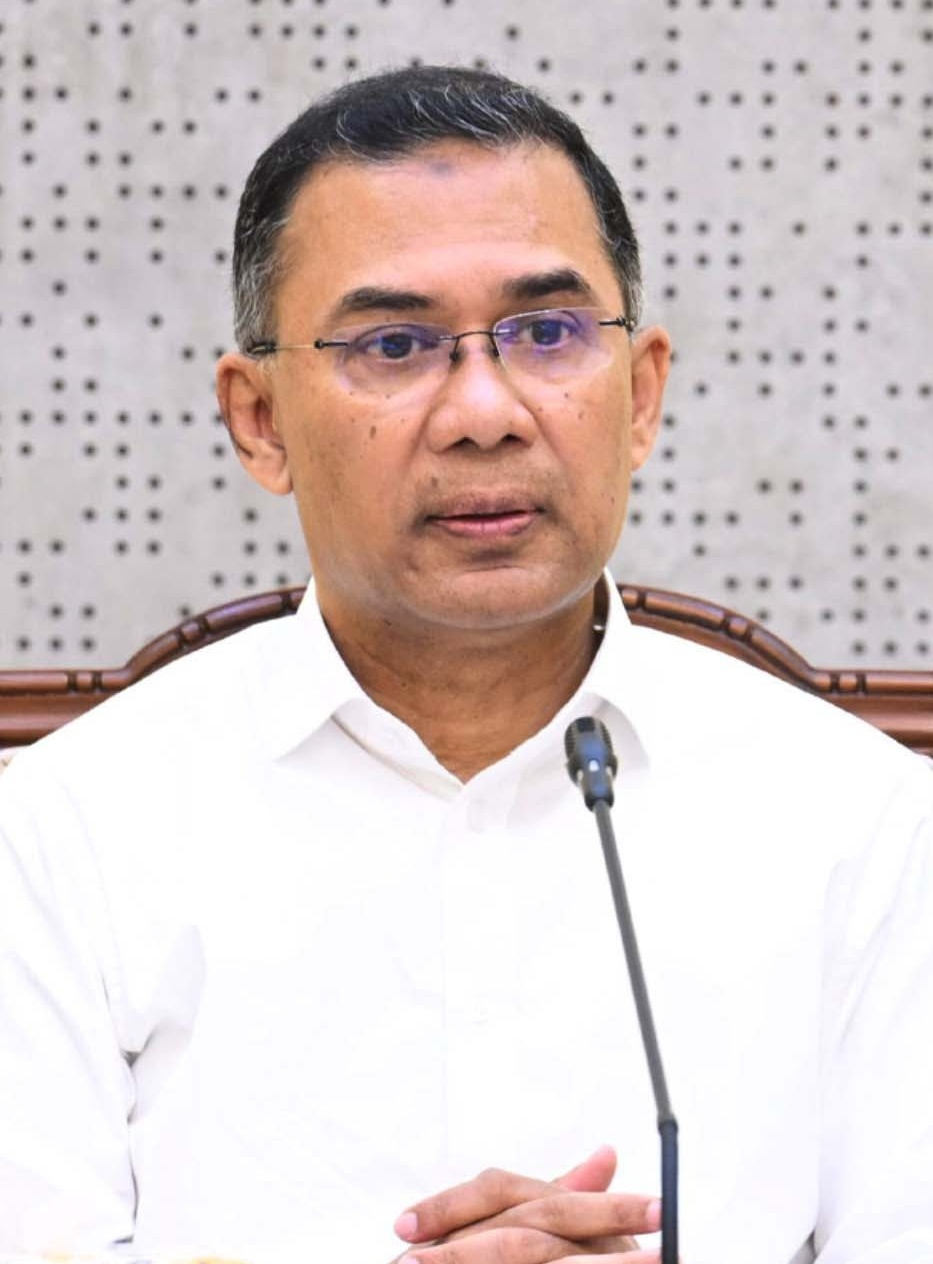
People's Republic of Bangladesh
Tarique Rahman
Prime Minister of Bangladesh

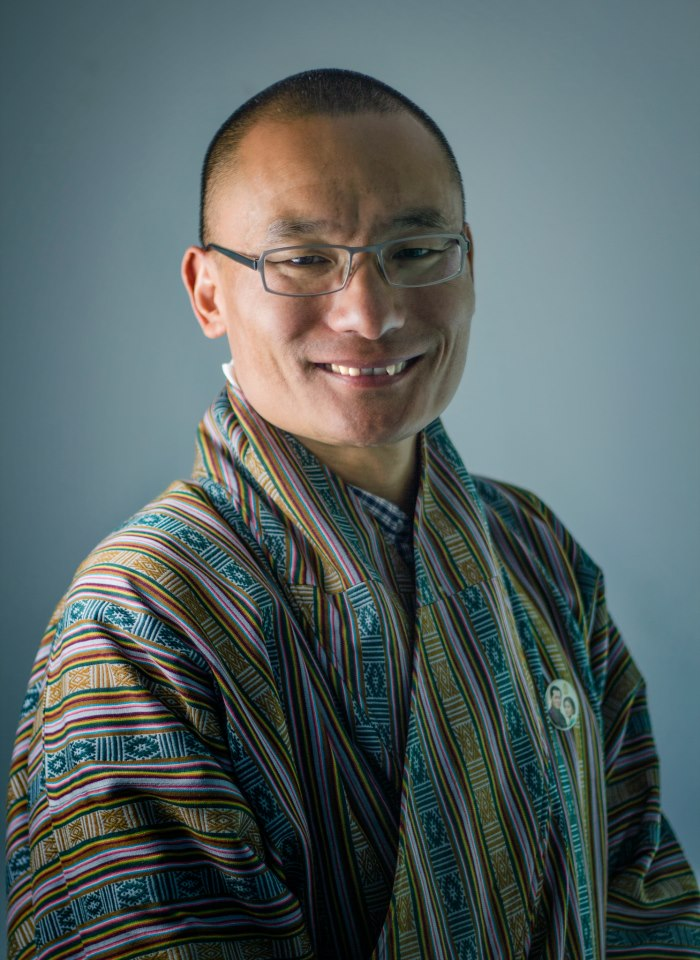
Kingdom of Bhutan
Tshering Tobgay
Prime Minister of Bhutan

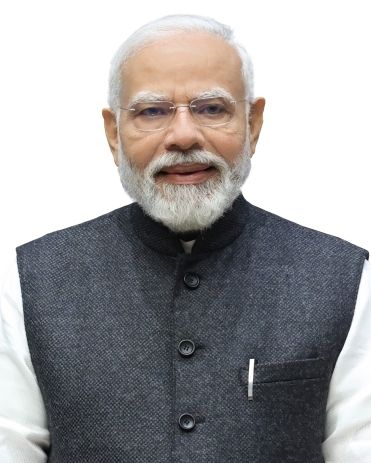
Republic of India
Narendra Modi
Prime Minister of India

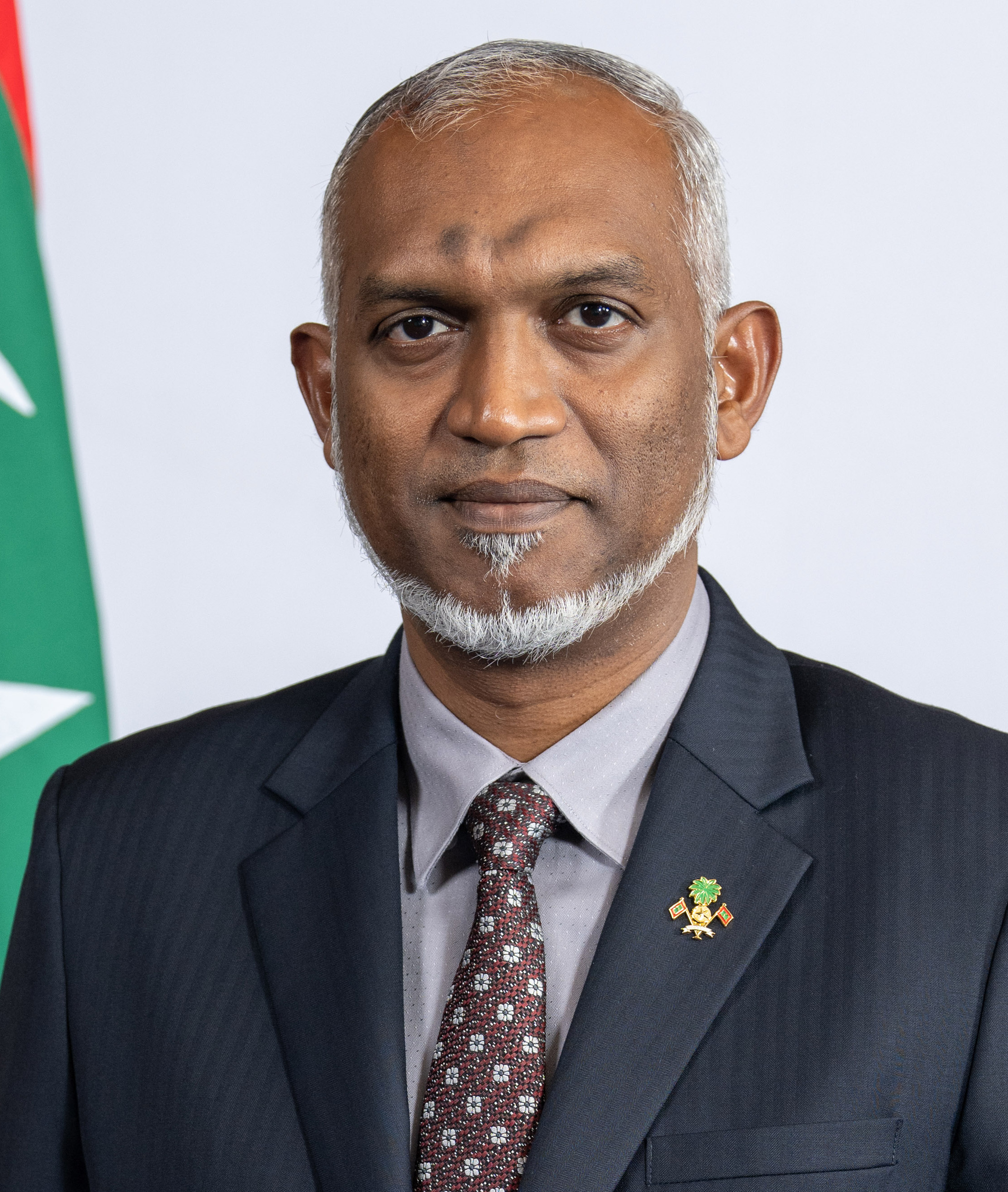
Republic of Maldives
Mohamed Muizzu
President of the Maldives

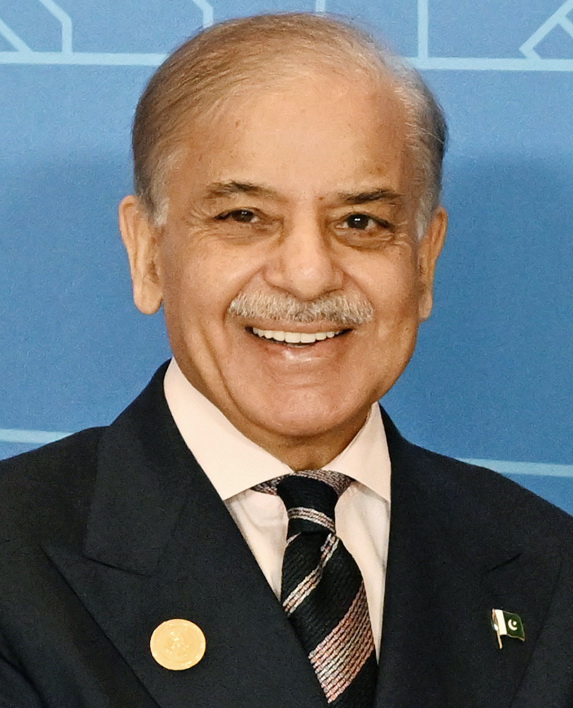
Islamic Republic of Pakistan
Shehbaz Sharif
Prime Minister of Pakistan

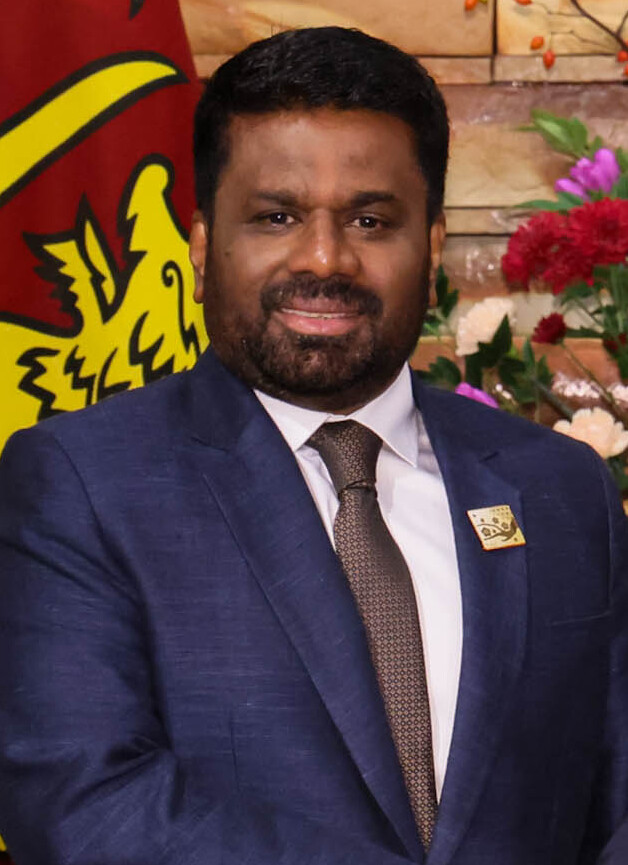
Democratic Socialist Republic of Sri Lanka
Anura Kumara Dissanayake
President of Sri Lanka

=== Current leaders ===
Country	Chief executive	Incumbent
Afghanistan	Supreme Leader (de facto)	Hibatullah Akhundzada
Bangladesh	Prime Minister	Tarique Rahman
Bhutan	Prime Minister	Tshering Tobgay
India	Prime Minister	Narendra Modi
Maldives	President	Mohamed Muizzu
Nepal	Prime Minister	Balendra Shah
Pakistan	Prime Minister	Shehbaz Sharif
Sri Lanka	President	Anura Kumara Dissanayake

== See also ==
- ASEAN and India's Look-East connectivity projects
- Asia Cooperation Dialogue
- SAARC Chamber of Commerce and Industry
- Bangladesh Bhutan India Nepal Initiative
- BIMSTEC
- Indian-Ocean Rim Association
- ICAN
- List of SAARC summits
- Mekong–Ganga Cooperation
- SAARC satellite
- South Asian University
- South Asia Subregional Economic Cooperation
- Shanghai Cooperation Organisation
- Economic Cooperation Organization
