= Secretary General of the South Asian Association for Regional Cooperation =

Head of a SAARC Secretariat

Secretary-General of the South Asian Association for Regional Cooperation
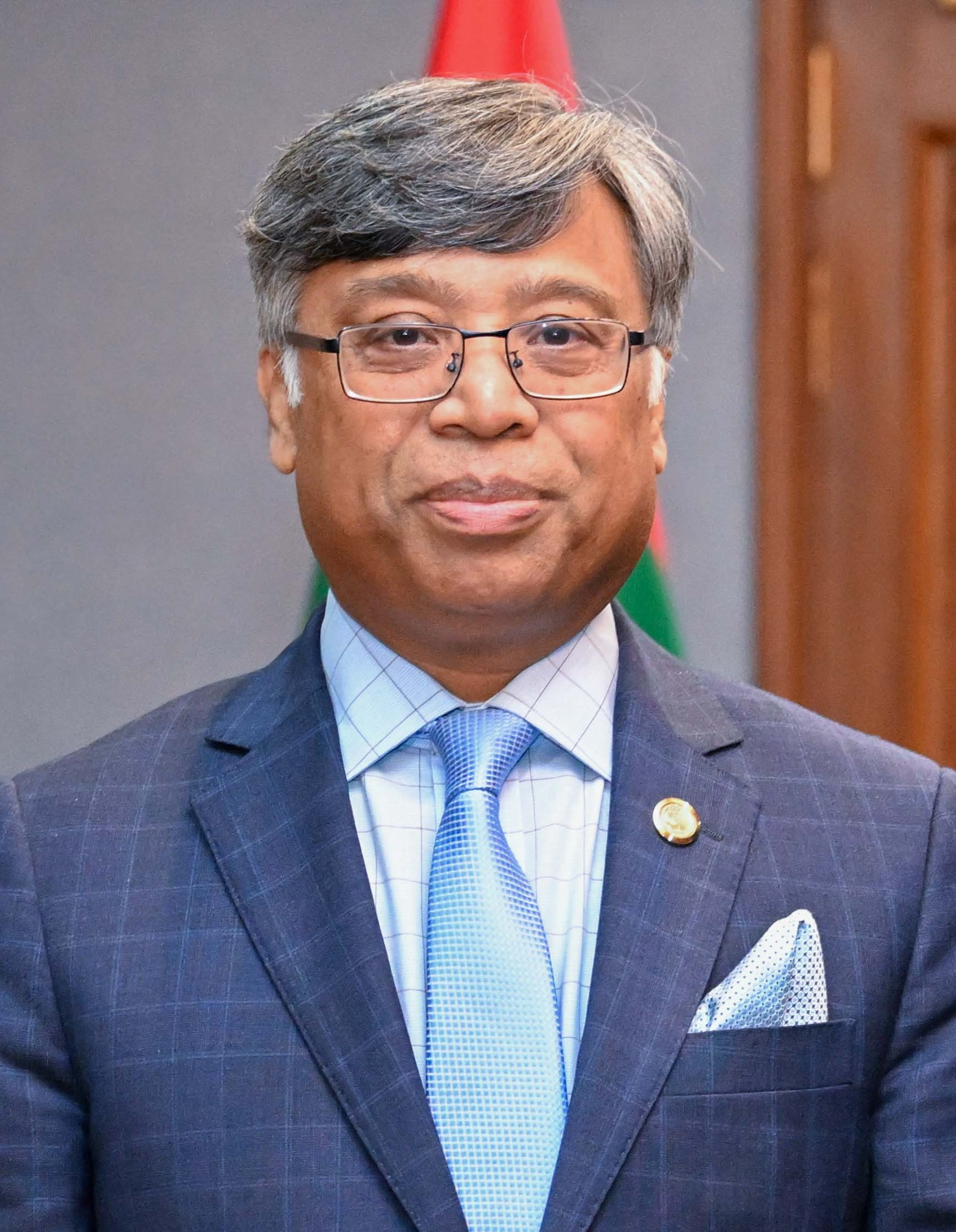
- Incumbent (Bangladesh) Md. Golam Sarwar since 25 October 2023
- Residence: Kathmandu, Nepal
- Appointer: Council of Ministers of the SAARC nations
- Term length: 3 years
- Formation: SAARC Charter: 16 January 1987
- First holder: Abul Ahsan
- Website: saarc-sec.org

The secretary-general of the South Asian Association for Regional Cooperation is head of the SAARC Secretariat, which is headquartered in Kathmandu, Nepal. SAARC is an economic and geopolitical union between the eight South Asian member nations: Afghanistan (from 2007), Bangladesh, Bhutan, India, Maldives, Nepal, Pakistan, and Sri Lanka. The secretary-general is appointed for a three-year term by election by a council of ministers from member states. The secretary-general is assisted by eight deputies, one from each nation, who also reside in Kathmandu. The SAARC Secretariat was established in Kathmandu on 16 January 1987 by Bangladeshi diplomat Abul Ahsan, who was its first secretary-general, and was inaugurated by King Birendra Bir Bikram Shah of Nepal. Since its creation, its member nations have contributed to a total of fourteen general secretaries. Golam Sarwar from Bangladesh is the current 15th secretary-general of SAARC, having assumed charge on 4 March 2023.

Member countries of SAARC take turns in alphabetical order to nominate a secretary general. Sri Lankan nominee Esala Weerakoon's term ended in February 2023. Ordinarily it would have been Afghanistan's turn next. None of the other member states, however, had recognized the country's Taliban-led regime. So those member states skipped to the next country, Bangladesh, which put forward Golam Sarwar.

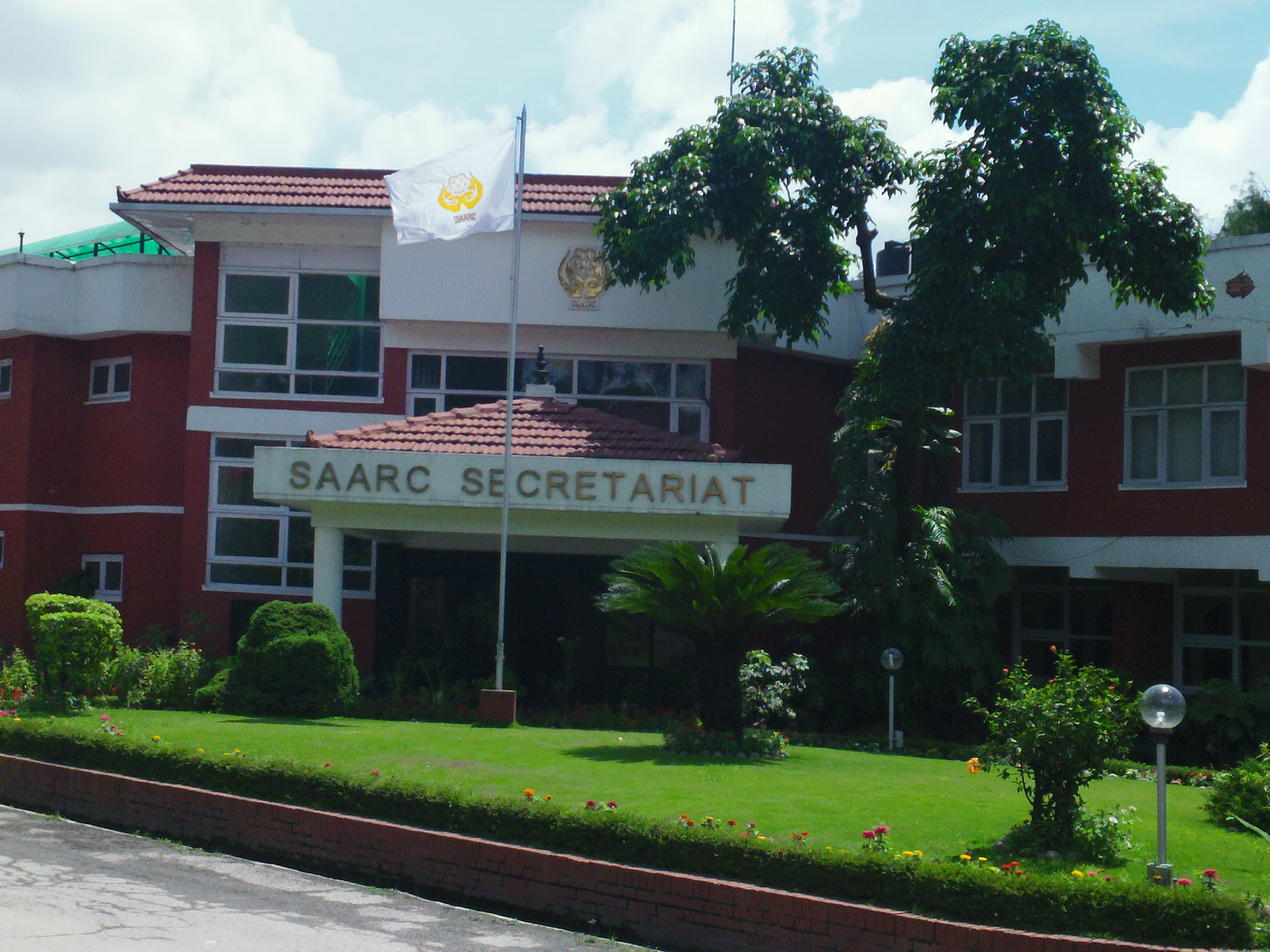
Secretariat of the South Asian Association for Regional Cooperation in Kathmandu, Nepal

== Residence ==
The SAARC Secretariat is based in Kathmandu, Nepal. It coordinates and monitors the implementation of activities, hosts meetings, and serves as a channel of communication between the association and its member states as well as other regional organizations.

The secretary-general is assisted by eight directors on deputation from the member states, and SAARC Secretariat includes officials from Afghanistan, Bangladesh, Bhutan, India, the Maldives, Nepal, Pakistan and Sri Lanka.

== Regional centres ==
The SAARC Secretariat is supported by the following regional centers established in member states to promote regional co-operation. These centers are managed by governing boards composed of representatives from all the member states, the SAARC Secretariat and the Ministry of Foreign Affairs of the host government. The director of the center acts as member secretary to the Governing Board, which reports to the Programming Committee.

- SAARC Agricultural Centre (SAC), Dhaka, Bangladesh
- SAARC Meteorological Research Centre (SMRC), Dhaka, Bangladesh
- SAARC Tuberculosis and HIV/AIDS Centre (STAC), Kathmandu, Nepal
- SAARC Documentation Centre (SDC), New Delhi, India
- SAARC Human Resources Development Centre (SHRDC), Islamabad, Pakistan
- SAARC Coastal Zone Management Centre (SCZMC), Maldives
- SAARC Information Centre (SIC), Nepal
- SAARC Energy Centre (SEC), Pakistan
- SAARC Disaster Management Centre (SDMC), Gandhinagar, Gujarat, India
- SAARC Development Fund (SDF), Bhutan
- SAARC Forestry Centre (SFC), Bhutan
- SAARC Cultural Centre (SCC), Sri Lanka

== History ==
There have been 12 democratically elected holders of the office of secretary-general of the South Asian Association for Regional Cooperation (SAARC). Bangladesh held the first summit in Dhaka, where the Bangladeshi diplomat, Abul Ahsan was elected its first secretary-general. Since then, 11 more general secretaries have been selected from each member nation, so far except for Afghanistan.

== Secretary-Generals ==
List of appointees to Secretary-General of the SAARC
Secretary-General	Image	Term of Office	Country	Ref.
Abul Ahsan		16 January 1987 – 15 October 1989	Bangladesh	
Kant Kishore Bhargava		17 October 1989 – 31 December 1991	India	
Ibrahim Hussain Zaki		1 January 1992 – 31 December 1993	Maldives	
Yadav Kant Silwal		1 January 1994 – 31 December 1995	Nepal	
Naeem U. Hasan		1 January 1996 – 31 December 1998	Pakistan	
Nihal Rodrigo		1 January 1999 – 10 January 2002	Sri Lanka	
Q. A. M. A. Rahim		11 January 2002 – 28 February 2005	Bangladesh	
Chenkyab Dorji		1 March 2005 – 29 February 2008	Bhutan	
Sheel Kant Sharma		1 March 2008 – 28 February 2011	India	
Fathimath Dhiyana Saeed		1 March 2011 – 11 March 2012	Maldives	
Ahmed Saleem		12 March 2012 – 28 February 2014	Maldives	
Arjun Bahadur Thapa		1 March 2014 – 28 February 2017	Nepal	
Amjad Hussain B. Sial		1 March 2017 – 29 February 2020	Pakistan	
Esala Weerakoon		1 March 2020 – 3 March 2023	Sri Lanka	
Md. Golam Sarwar		4 March 2023 – present	Bangladesh	
