= Md. Golam Sarwar =

Bangladeshi diplomat

- মো: গোলাম সারোয়ার
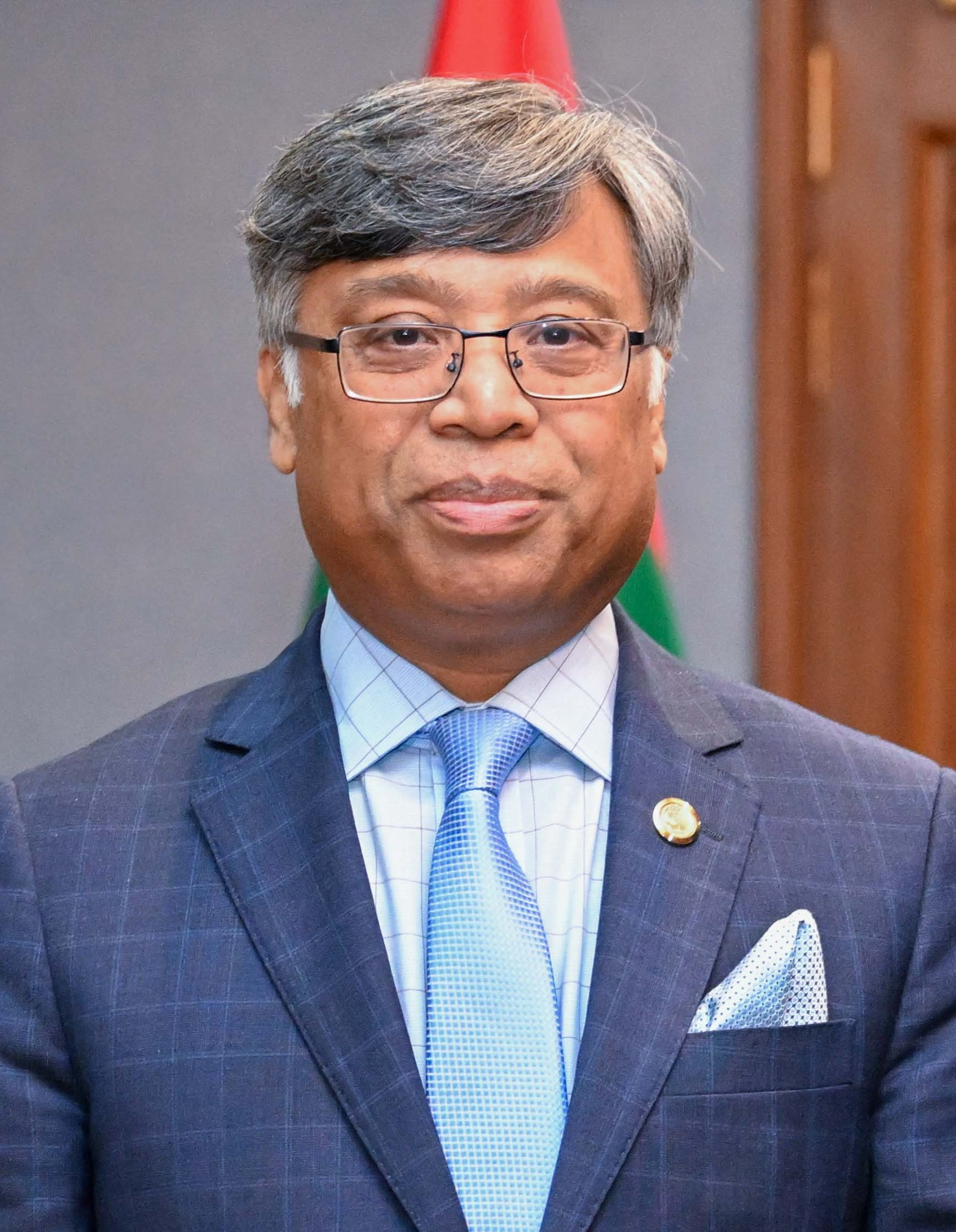
- Sarwar in 2024

15th SAARC Secretary General
- Incumbent
- Assumed office 4 March 2023
- Preceded by: Esala Ruwan Weerakoon

Personal details
- Born: 1 July 1966 (age 60) Noakhali, East Pakistan
- Education: University of Dhaka
- Occupation: Civil servant

Md. Golam Sarwar is a Bangladesh diplomat and secretary general of the South Asian Association for Regional Cooperation. He is the former high commissioner of Bangladesh to Malaysia. He is the former ambassador of Bangladesh to Oman.

== Early life ==
Sarwar was born on 1 July 1966 in Noakhali District, East Pakistan, Pakistan (now Bangladesh). He did his master's in accounting at the University of Dhaka.

== Career ==
Sarwar joined the Bangladesh Civil Service in 1991 as a foreign affairs cadre. He was an assistant secretary from 1991 to 1996 at the Ministry of Foreign Affairs. He was the second secretary of the Embassy of Bangladesh to Myanmar from 1996 to 1997. He was the first secretary at the High Commission of Bangladesh in Malaysia from 1997 to 2000. He was a counsellor at the Embassy of Bangladesh in Nepal from 2000 to 2002.

Sarwar was the director and deputy chief of protocol from 2002 to 2005 at the Ministry of Foreign Affairs. He was the counsellor in the Embassy of Bangladesh in the United States from 2005 to 2006 and then minister of the Embassy of Bangladesh in the United States from 2006 to 2008. He was the consul general of Bangladesh in Jeddah, Saudi Arabia from 2008 to 2010.

Sarwar was the ambassador of Bangladesh to Sweden from 2013 to 2017. He was concurrently accredited as the ambassador of Bangladesh to Denmark, ambassador of Bangladesh to Norway, ambassador of Bangladesh to Finland, and the ambassador of Bangladesh to Iceland. He served as the ambassador of Bangladesh to Oman from 2017 to 2020. In December 2020, he was appointed high commissioner of Bangladesh to Malaysia. Md. Nazmul Islam replaced him as the Ambassador of Bangladesh to Sweden.

In July 2023, Sarwar was appointed the 15th secretary general of the South Asian Association for Regional Cooperation, becoming the third Bangladeshi to hold the post since its creation, and succeeding Esala Ruwan Weerakoon of Sri Lanka. Abul Ahsan and QAMA Rahim were the first and second Bangladeshi secretary generals of the South Asian Association for Regional Cooperation. M. Shameem Ahsan was appointed to replace him as the high commissioner of Bangladesh to Malaysia.

== Personal life ==
Sarwar is married to Taslima.
