= Laxman Singh Rathore =

Indian scientist

Dr. Laxman Singh Rathore
- Born: 4 July 1954 (age 71); Rajasthan, India
- Education: Masters and Doctoral degrees in Agriculture
- Alma mater: Rajasthan College of Agriculture, Udaipur
- Occupation: Former Director General of India Meteorological Department(IMD)
- Years active: 1980–2016
- Employer: Government of India
- Organization: India Meteorological Department

Laxman Singh Rathore is an Indian scientist, former Director General of India Meteorological Department, New Delhi, and permanent representative of India with the World Meteorological Organization (WMO).

== Early life ==
Rathore obtained his secondary and senior secondary school education from Chopasani School, Jodhpur and Bachelor's degree from Bhupal Nobles College, Udaipur. Rathore completed his master's and doctoral degrees in agriculture (soil science) from the Rajasthan College of Agriculture, Udaipur.

== Career ==
Rathore joined India Meteorological Department in 1980 as Meteorologist. He played a role in setting up the weather-based agricultural advisory service in India. He served as Vice President of the Commission of Agriculture Meteorology, WMO. He is an acclaimed weather forecaster. He communicated about Cyclone Phailin and Cyclone Hudhud. He retired from the service in 2016. He is a member of the executive council of WMO, Chairman of SAARC Meteorological Research Centre. He participated in Indian Scientific expedition to Antarctica in 1983–84. Rathore served as President of Indian Meteorological Society and President of Association of Agrometeorologists.

Rathore became Director General of Meteorology, India Meteorological Department (IMD) in 2012 and served as DG till 2016. He contributed toward improving weather forecast, particularly the extreme weather events like cyclones, extreme temperatures, heavy precipitation.

Rathore participated in third Indian Antarctic Expedition during 1983-84. He has published more than 100 research papers and written around a dozen books and many book chapters.

The World Bank appointed Rathore as International Consultant to assist the bank in improving weather and climate services in South Asia.

He servies on various committees of Government of India.

== Recognition ==
- WMO award for accurate prediction and warnings of cyclones
- Indian Army award for rendering meteorological information support for defense expeditions
- of Rajasthan Science Congress Award
- Sohrab Godrez award for science & technology, by Rotary Club
- Honorary Professor by Amity University, Jaipur
- Vigyan Ratna by Vigyan Parishad Prayag
- DD Kisan Samman by Doordarshan
- Maharana Mewar Award; Marwar Ratna Award
- Rajbhasha Shri Puraskar, and ICHL Award

== See also ==
- Meteorology
- India Meteorological Department
- National Centre for Medium Range Weather Forecasting
- Department of Science & Technology
- Ministry of Earth Sciences
