= List of ambassadors of Nepal to Russia =

Coordinates: 55.740108°N 37.582331°E

Ambassador of Nepal to Russia
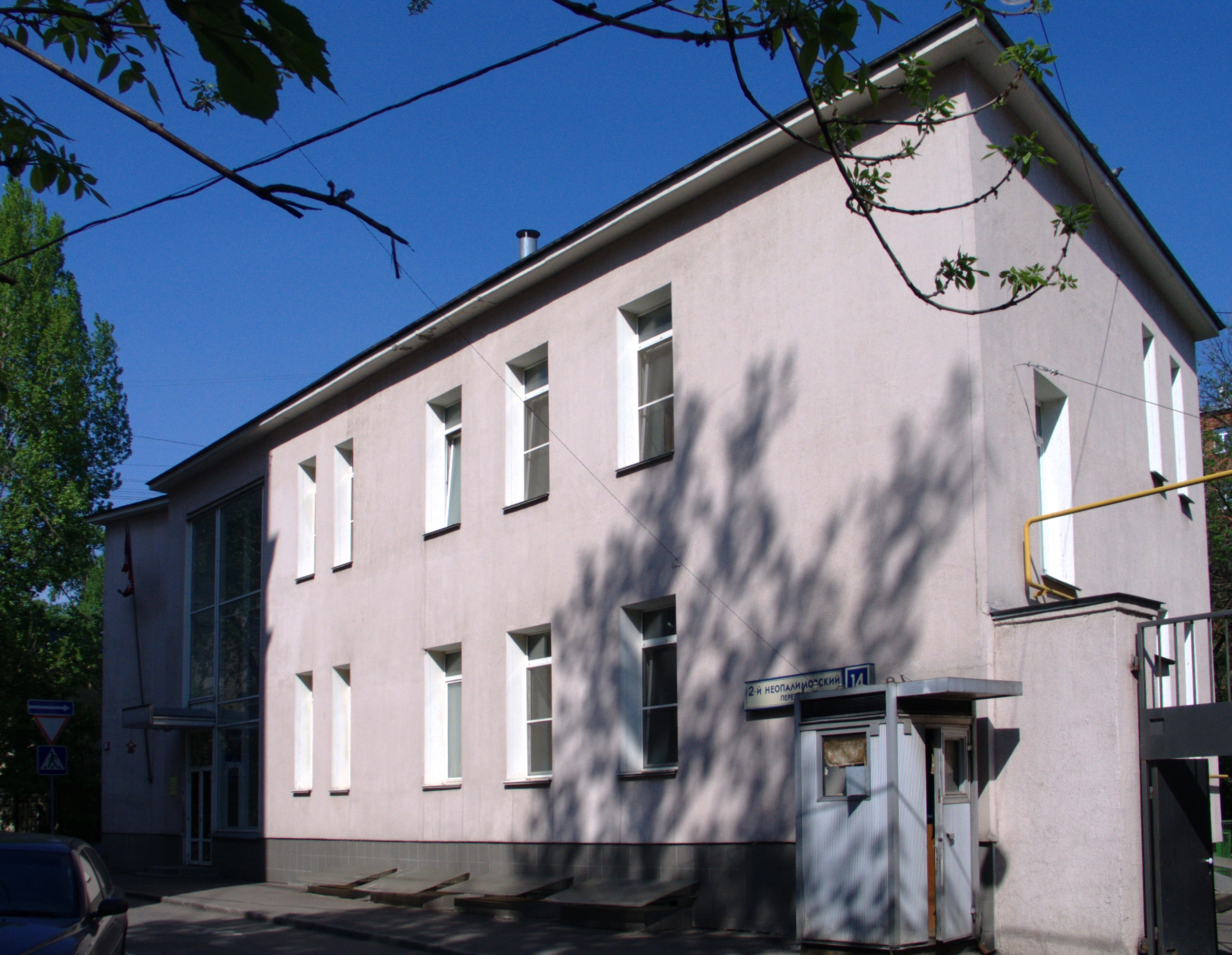
- Incumbent; Rishi Ram Ghimire since December 9, 2016
- Inaugural holder: Ram Prasad Manandhar
- Formation: 1957

The current ambassador is Rishi Ram Ghimire.

The Nepali ambassador in Moscow is the official representative of the Government in Kathmandu to the Government of the Russia.

== List of representatives ==
Diplomatic agrément/Diplomatic accreditation	Ambassador	Observations	List of prime ministers of Nepal	List of presidents of Russia	Term end
July 20, 1956		established diplomatic relations	Tanka Prasad Acharya	Nikolai Bulganin	
1957	Ram Prasad Manandhar		Kunwar Inderjit Singh	Nikolai Bulganin	1960
July 27, 1961	Jharendra Naryan Singh		Tulsi Giri	Nikita Khrushchev	1964
1964	Damodar Shumsher J.B.Rana		Tulsi Giri	Leonid Brezhnev	1966
1968	Balchandra Sharma		Tulsi Giri	Leonid Brezhnev	1971
1972	Jagdhish Shumsher J.B.Rana		Surya Bahadur Thapa	Leonid Brezhnev	1976
1977	Gyanendra Bahadur Karki		Kirti Nidhi Bista	Leonid Brezhnev	1982
1982	Narendra Bikram Shah		Surya Bahadur Thapa	Leonid Brezhnev	1985
1986	Bishweshwar Prasad Rimal		Nagendra Prasad Rijal	Andrei Gromyko	1990
November 27, 1992	Yadav Kant Silwal		Girija Prasad Koirala	Boris Yeltsin	October 27, 1991
November 8, 1995	Kumar Prasad Gyawali		Sher Bahadur Deuba	Boris Yeltsin	July 26, 1993
September 23, 1996	Lal Bahadur Khadayat		Sher Bahadur Deuba	Boris Yeltsin	September 4, 1998
February 19, 2001	Lila Prasad Sharma		Sher Bahadur Deuba	Vladimir Putin	February 19, 2005
June 12, 2005	Hiranya Lal Shrestha		Gyanendra Bir Bikram Shah Dev	Vladimir Putin	May 21, 2006
November 27, 2007	Surya Kiran Gurung		Girija Prasad Koirala	Vladimir Putin	February 25, 2012
May 8, 2012	Ravi Mohan Sapkota Kopila		Baburam Bhattarai	Dmitry Medvedev	May 7, 2016
December 9, 2016	Rishi Ram Ghimire		Khadga Prasad Oli	Vladimir Putin	

== See also ==
- List of ambassadors of Russia to Nepal
