= 16th SAARC summit =

16th summit of SAARC

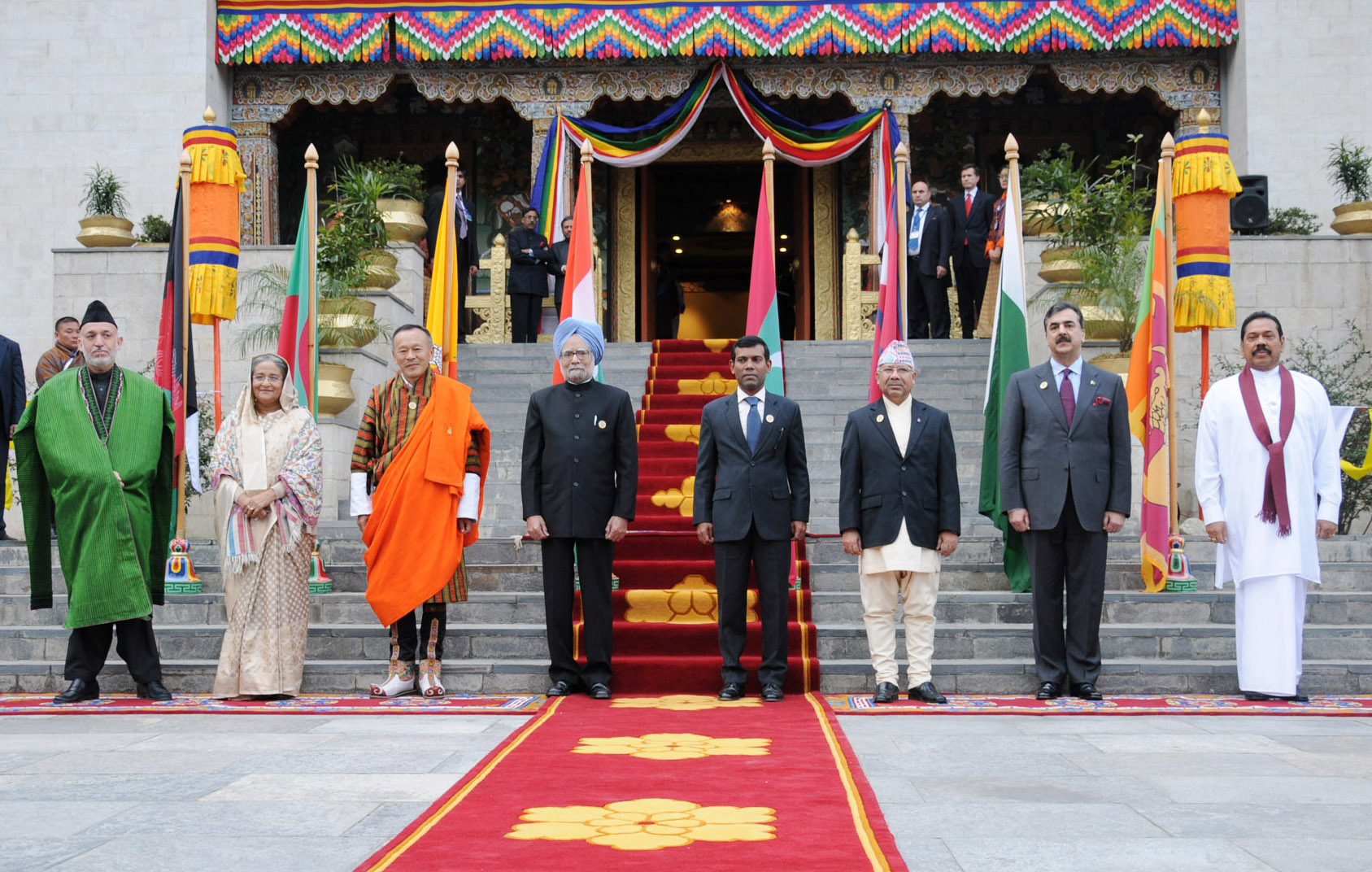
- Group photo
- Host country: Bhutan
- Date: 28–29 April 2010
- Motto: Towards a Green and Happy South Asia
- Cities: Thimphu
- Participants: Afghanistan; Bangladesh; Bhutan; India; Maldives; Nepal; Pakistan; Sri Lanka
- Chair: Jigme Thinley, Prime Minister of Bhutan
- Follows: 15th SAARC summit
- Precedes: 17th SAARC summit

The sixteenth summit of the South Asian Association for Regional Cooperation took place in Thimphu, Bhutan on 28–29 April 2010. It was the first time that the summit was held in Bhutan since the inception of the organisation in 1985 and also marked the organisation's 25th anniversary. The theme of the summit was "Towards a Green and Happy South Asia". The summit was attended by leaders from all member states and five observer states.

== Agenda and outcomes ==
The theme of the summit was "Towards a Green and Happy South Asia", with a primary focus on climate change, regional connectivity, and development. Following the summit, the Thimphu Statement on Climate Change was adopted, which established an Inter-governmental Expert Group on Climate Change to guide regional policy and cooperation. The leaders signed the SAARC Convention on Cooperation on Environment, pledging to plant ten million trees across the region over the next five years to combat deforestation.

The leaders agreed to declare 2010–2020 as the "Decade of Intra-Regional Connectivity". They committed to advancing the South Asian Free Trade Area and signed a Trade in Services Agreement Framework. They also proposed an electricity market roadmap and regional cooperation in renewable and sustainable energy.

The leaders also agreed to operationalise the SAARC Development Fund (SDF) and mainstreamed the SAARC Development Goals (SDGs). They also welcomed the progress on the South Asian University and also proposed a Charter of Democracy and planned a SAARC Parliamentarians Conclave, alongside the establishment of the South Asia Forum.

The leaders also collectively vowed to combat terrorism and transnational crimes, expressing concern over threats to regional peace and economic stability.

At the end of the summit, Australia and Myanmar were admitted as observer countries in the organisation.

== Participating leaders ==
=== Leaders of member countries ===
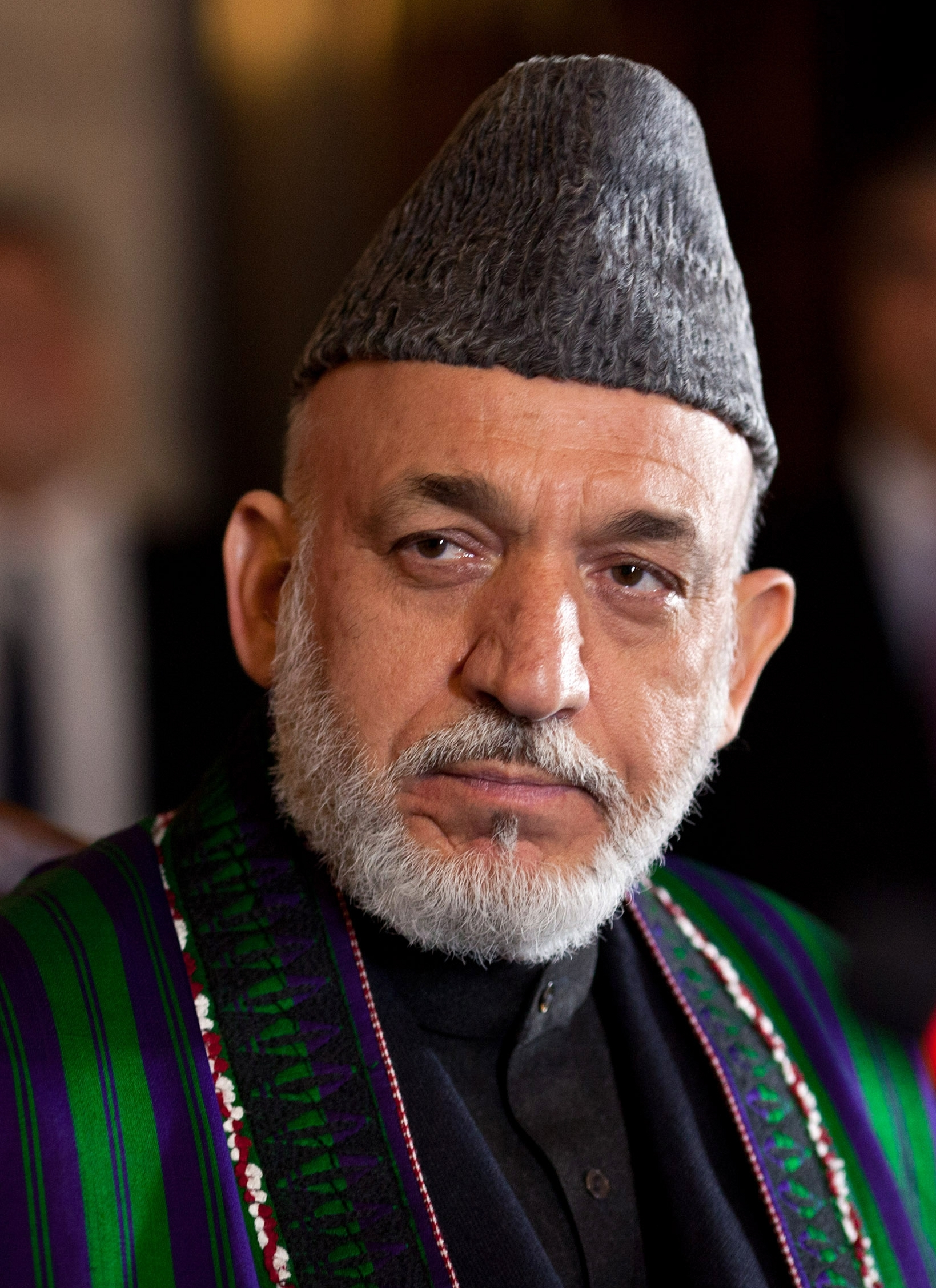
Afghanistan
Hamid Karzai,
President

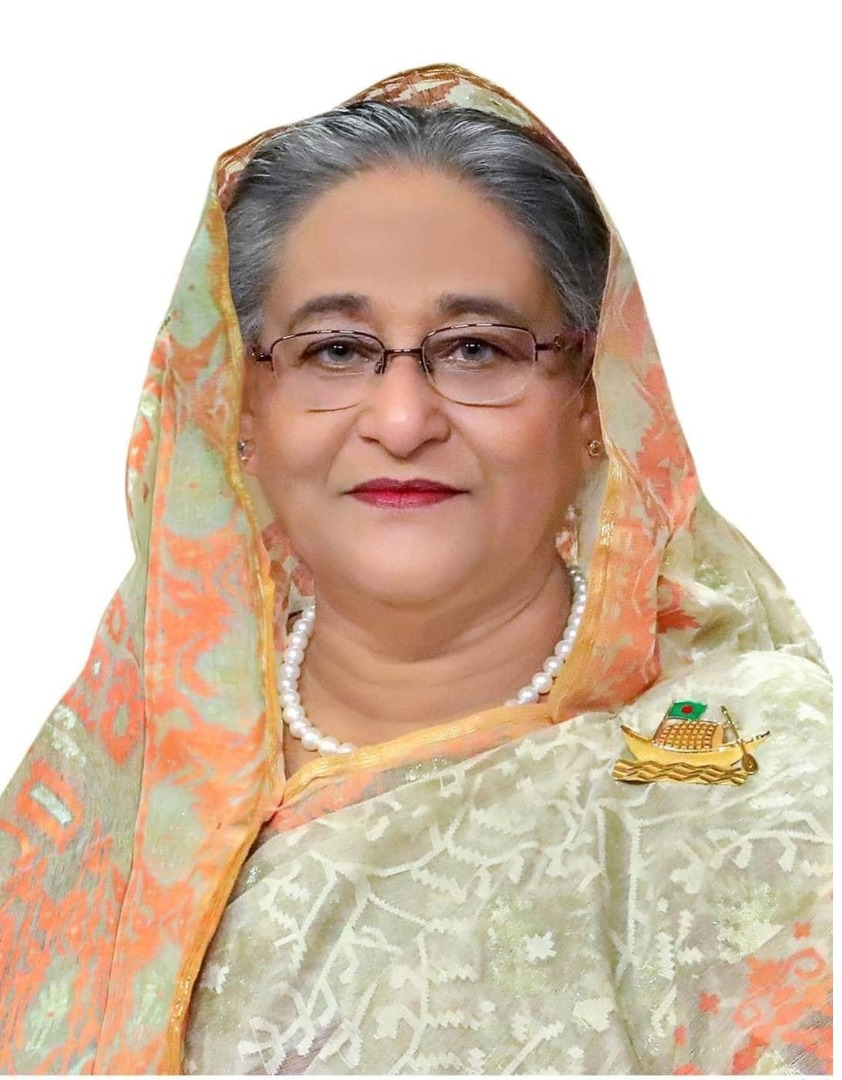
Bangladesh
Sheikh Hasina,
Prime Minister

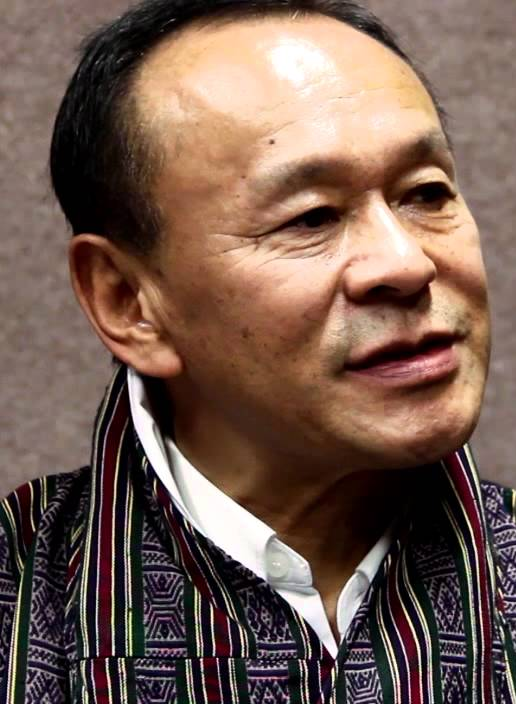
Bhutan
Jigmi Thinley (Chair),
Prime Minister

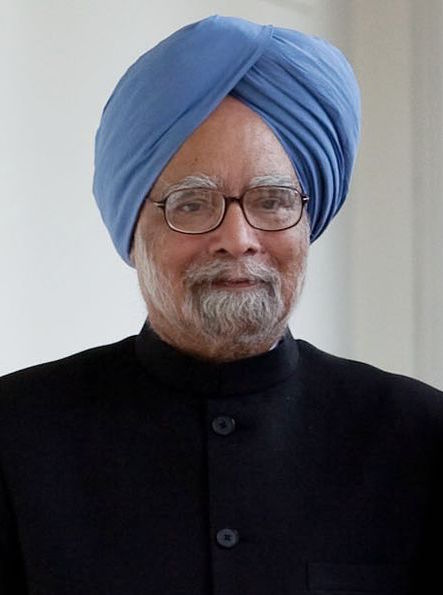
India
Manmohan Singh,
Prime Minister

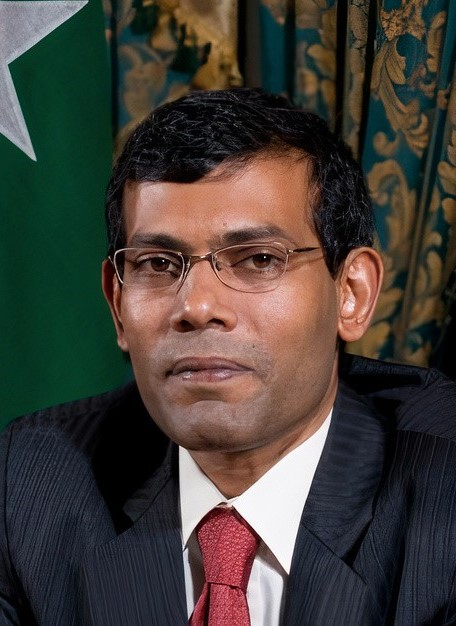
Maldives
Mohamed Nasheed,
President

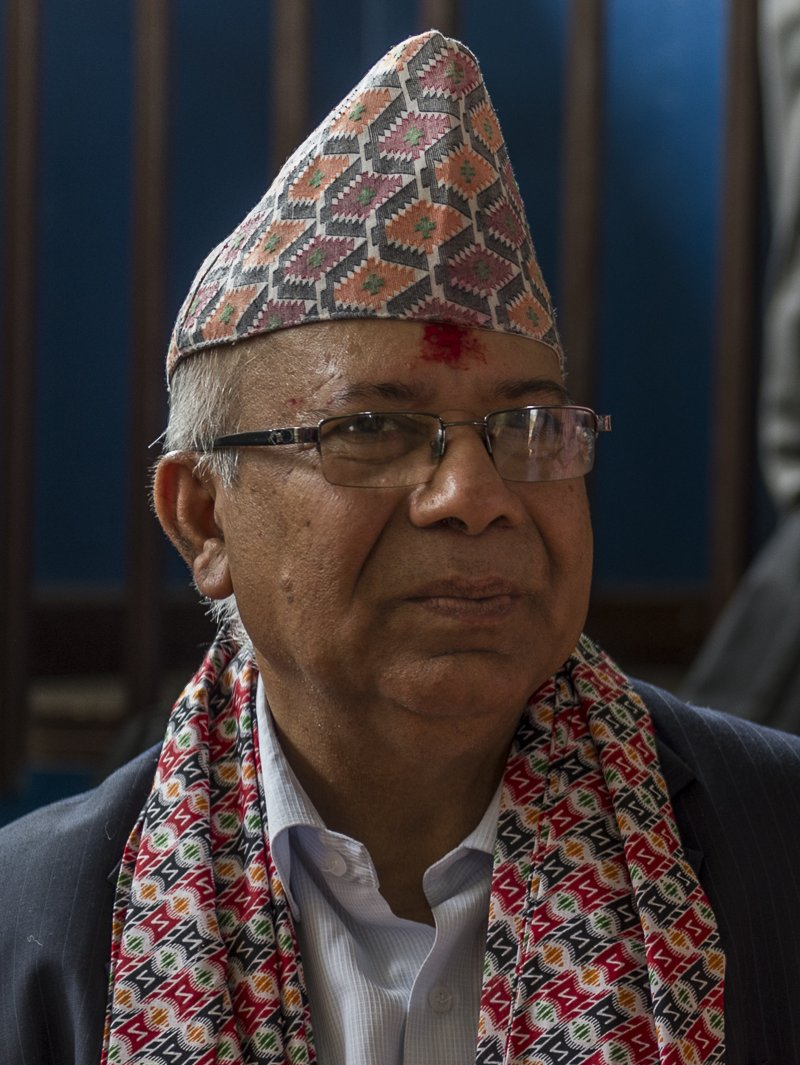
Nepal
Madhav Kumar Nepal,
Prime Minister

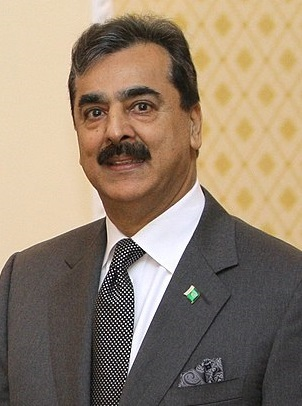
Pakistan
Yousaf Raza Gillani,
Prime Minister

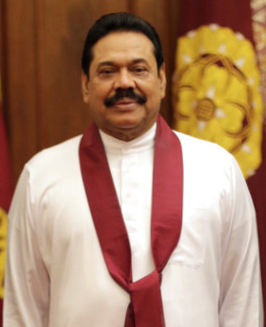
Sri Lanka
Mahinda Rajapaksa,
President

=== Leaders of observer countries ===
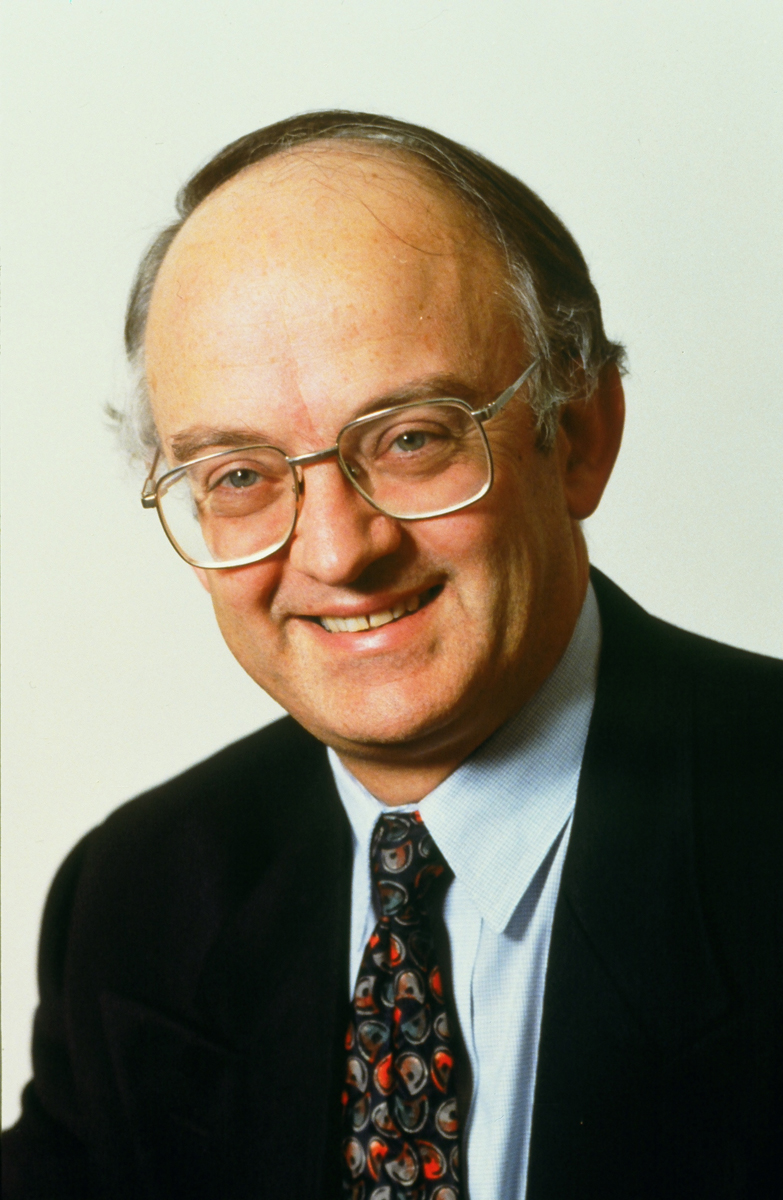
Australia
Bob McMullan,
Parliamentary Secretary for International Development Assistance

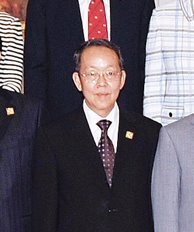
China
Wang Guangya,
Executive Vice-Minister of Foreign Affairs

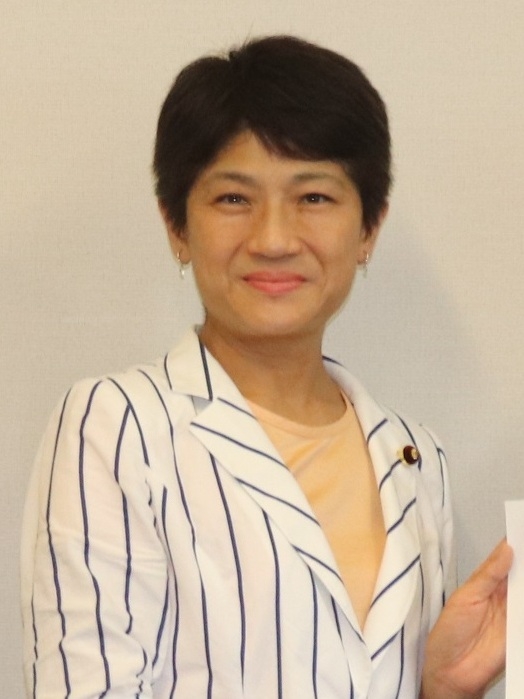
Japan
Chinami Nishimura,
Parliamentary Vice-Minister of Foreign Affairs

South Korea
Yong-joon Lee,
Deputy Minister of Foreign Affairs

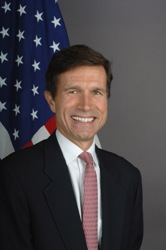
United States
Robert O. Blake Jr.,
Assistant Secretary of State for South and Central Asian Affairs

== See also ==
- List of SAARC summits
