= Bradman Weerakoon =

Sri Lankan civil servant (1930–2025)

Deshamanya Bradman Weerakoon CCS
- බ්‍රැඩ්මන් වීරකෝන් பிராட்மேன் வீரக்கோன்
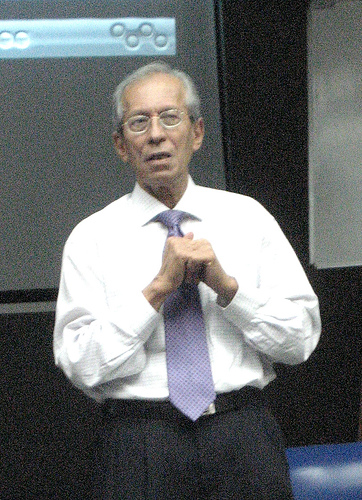
- Weerakoon in 2007
- Born: 20 October 1930; Colombo, British Ceylon (now Sri Lanka)
- Died: 7 July 2025 (aged 94); Colombo, Sri Lanka
- Education: University of Ceylon; University of Michigan
- Occupation: Civil servant
- Notable work: Rendering Unto Caesar, Kalutara - An Odyssey
- Spouse: Damayanthi Gunasekara (died 2007)
- Children: Esala Weerakoon

Deshamanya Robin Bradman Weerakoon (20 October 1930 – 7 July 2025) was a Sri Lankan civil servant. As a senior bureaucrat of the Sri Lankan government, he served nine Sri Lankan heads of state in a career spanning half a century.

== Early life ==
His father, Edmund R. Weerakoon and his mother, a teacher at Princess of Wales College, were both devout Anglicans. He was born in Colombo, Sri Lanka on 20 October 1930 and named after the legendary Australian cricketer Don Bradman who sailed to Colombo on the day of his birth.

== Education ==
Weerakoon studied at Holy Cross College, Kalutara, and later was one of the first boarding students at St. Thomas's College, Guruthalawa during the Mount Lavinia parent school's breakup into three separate branch schools (at Kollupitiya, Guruthalawa and Bandarawela) during World War II. He obtained a Bachelor of Arts degree with second class honours (upper division) in economics and sociology from the University of Ceylon at Peradeniya and was awarded a Fulbright scholarship to study at the University of Michigan for one year where he did his MA in sociology.

== Civil service ==
Weerakoon joined the Ceylon Civil Service in 1954 and was assigned as a cadet to the Anuradhapura Kachcheri as an understudy to the Government Agent (GA) of Anuradhapura, after which he spent a year in Jaffna where he learnt Tamil. After that he was transferred to Badulla, but before he could assume duties, the order was withdrawn and he was sent to the Prime Minister's office.

In 1953, he was appointed the assistant secretary to the prime minister at the time, Sir John Kotelawela. He later became the secretary to the prime minister and continued after Solomon Bandaranaike became the prime minister in 1956. After his death, he served Wijayananda Dahanayake and Sirimavo Bandaranaike. Thereafter he worked for Dudley Senanayake although some in the UNP felt uneasy about his presence. After Sirimavo won the election again in 1970, he was transferred as Government Agent of Batticaloa and later Ampara, since he was deemed untrustworthy having conveyed information to the UNP Dudley Senanayake during Mrs. Bandaranaike's previous regime.

In 1976, he retired from his post to join the International Planned Parenthood Federation (IPPF), an NGO working in the area of family planning as its Secretary General.

In 1977, J. R. Jayawardene appointed him as the Permanent Secretary to the Ministry of Plantation. In 1980, he joined the Prime Minister's office once again as secretary during the tenure of Prime Minister Ranasinghe Premadasa. Following the ethnic riots of 1983, he was appointed Commissioner-General of essential services with wide-ranging administrative powers. In 1984, he re-joined IPPF as its secretary-general in London for one year, which entailed a great deal of travel from China to Africa to Mexico.

Following President Premadasa's assumption of office, he was appointed presidential adviser on international affairs during a period when Indo-Sri Lankan relations were at their lowest, following the expulsion of the IPKF.

After Premadasa's death, he continued as the adviser of his successor D.B. Wijetunge, and resigned in 1994 when Chandrika Kumaratunga became the president.

After Ranil Wickremesinghe became the prime minister in 2001, Weerakoon was reappointed to his previous position of Secretary to the prime minister. He was an influential figure in Wickremesinghe's administration, especially in the peace process between the government and the Tamil Tigers.

His memoir Rendering Unto Caesar was published in 2004 after Wickremesinghe's government was defeated.

== Personal life and death ==
Weerakoon was married to Damayanthi Gunasekara until her death in June 2007. They had one child, Esala, who also became a senior civil servant and a diplomat, a former Sri Lankan ambassador to Norway. He declined to co-operate in a publicity campaign against the Tamil Tigers, former Deputy Chief of Mission at the Sri Lankan Embassy in Washington, D.C., and current Sri Lankan High Commissioner to India. Esala married Krishanti, the daughter of another well known Sri Lankan civil servant Bernard Tilakaratna.

Weerakoon died aged 94, on 7 July 2025. His funeral took place on 9 July, at the Kanatte Cemetery in Borella.
