= Kant Kishore Bhargava =

Indian diplomat

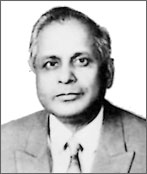

2nd SAARC Secretary General
- In office 17 October 1989 – 31 December 1991
- Preceded by: Abul Ahsan
- Succeeded by: Ibrahim Hussain Zaki

Kant Kishore Bhargava is an Indian diplomat who served as the second secretary-general of the South Asian Association for Regional Cooperation (SAARC) from 17 October 1989 to 31 December 1991. He emigrated to Canada in 1998.
