= Ibrahim Hussain Zaki =

Maldivian politician (born 1947)

Ibrahim Hussain Zaki NIIV
- އިބްރާހީމް ޙުސައިން ޒަކީ
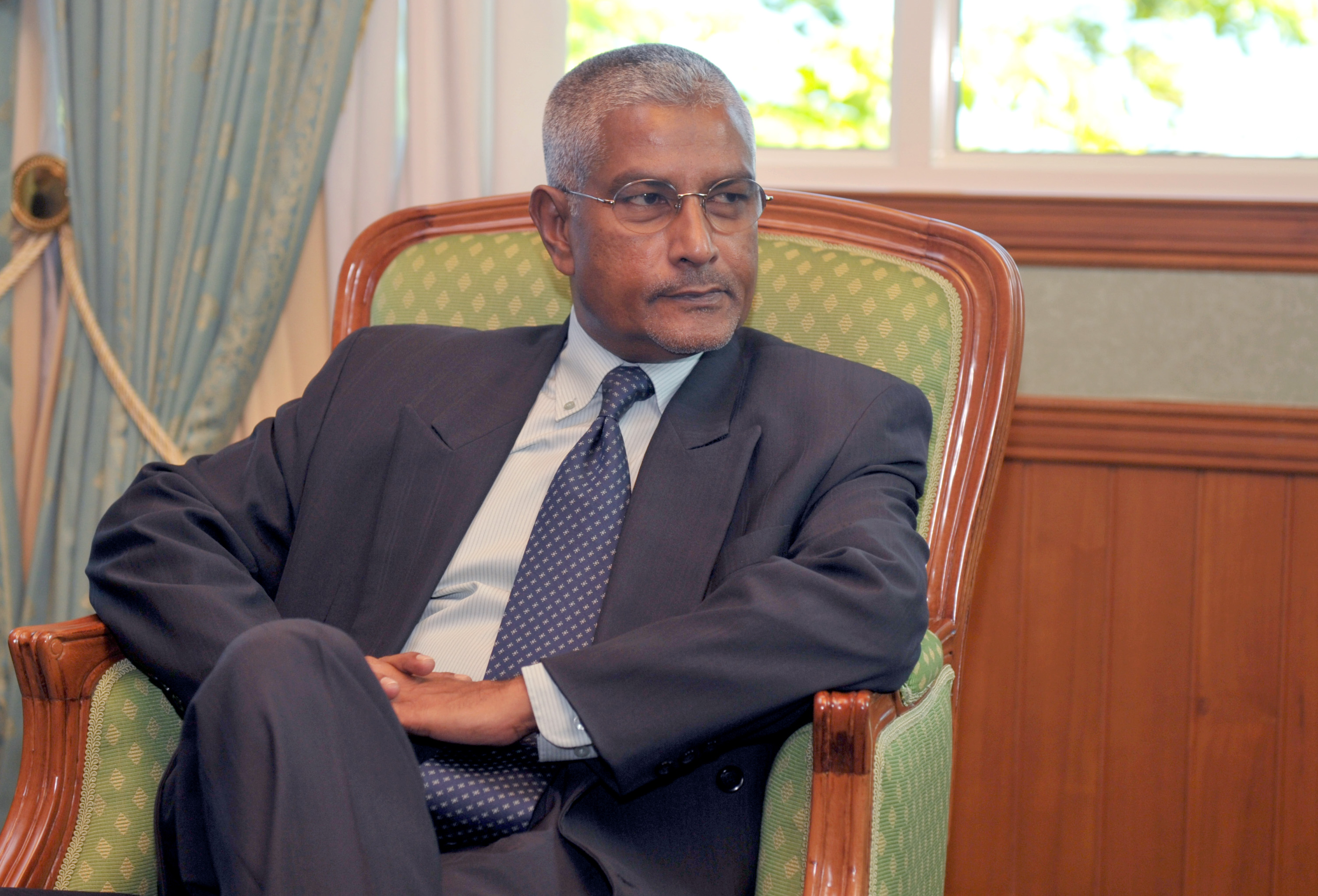
- Zaki in 2011

Special Envoy of the President
- In office 11 January 2009 – 7 February 2012
- President: Mohamed Nasheed

Minister of Planning and National Development
- In office 11 November 1998 – 11 November 2008
- President: Maumoon Abdul Gayoom

Minister of Tourism
- In office 11 November 1993 – 11 November 1998
- President: Maumoon Abdul Gayoom
- Preceded by: Abdulla Jameel
- Succeeded by: Hassan Sobir

3rd Secretary General of the South Asian Association for Regional Cooperation
- In office 1 January 1992 – 31 December 1993
- Preceded by: Kant Kishore Bhargava
- Succeeded by: Yadav Kant Silwal

Personal details
- Born: 30 November 1947 (age 78)
- Party: Maldivian Democratic Party (2003–2013)

Ibrahim Hussain Zaki, NIIV (Dhivehi: އިބްރާހީމް ޙުސައިން ޒަކީ; born 30 November 1947) is a Maldivian politician who served as the Minister of National Planning and Development from 1998 to 2008. He also served as the Minister of Tourism from 1993 to 1998 and the 3rd Secretary General of the South Asian Association for Regional Cooperation from 1992 to 1993. He also served as the Special Envoy of the President during the Nasheed administration.

== Career ==
During Zaki's early career, he joined public service under the Ministry of Foreign Affairs. He served as the 2nd and 3rd Secretary of the Embassy of the Maldives in Ceylon, Under Secretary of the Ministry, Permanent Under Secretary, and Deputy Minister of the Ministry of Foreign Affairs.

Zaki is also the first Maldivian to serve as the Secretary General of the South Asian Association for Regional Cooperation from 1992 to 1993.

Zaki was appointed by Maumoon Abdul Gayoom as the Minister of Tourism from 1993 to 1998.

Zaki was later appointed by Gayoom as the Minister of Planning and National Development from 1998 to 2008.

Zaki also served as the Special Envoy of the President during the Nasheed administration after his appointment in November 2008. He served as the People's Majlis member for Alif Dhaalu Atoll.

In 2013, Zaki retired from politics and left the Maldivian Democratic Party.

== Arrest ==
In November 2006, Zaki, then acting President of the MDP, was arrested for "inciting enmity against the lawful government".

In November 2012, Zaki and his son Mohamed Hamdan Zaki were among the arrested in Hondaidhoo Island in the Maldives along with two other Members of Parliament, in an alcohol and drug related bust, along MDP parliament members Abdulla Jabir and Hamid Abdul Ghafoor.

Upon release, he went into exile in India, but returned on 12 August 2013 to support the MDP in the 2013 presidential election. He was later charged by the police for consuming alcohol.

== Passport revocation ==
In 2020, the Civil Court issued an order to cancel Zaki's passport as part of a unsecured debt enforcement case. Five years later, the High Court overturned the order.

== Awards ==
In 2011, Zaki was awarded the Order of Izzuddin by president Mohamed Nasheed.
