= Arjun Bahadur Thapa =

Nepalese diplomat (born 1956)

- अर्जुन बहादुर थापा
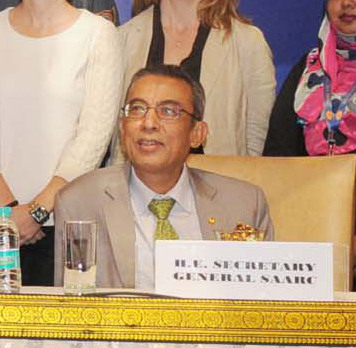
- Thapa in 2015

12th SAARC Secretary General
- In office 1 March 2014 – 28 February 2017
- Preceded by: Ahmed Saleem
- Succeeded by: Amjad Hussain B. Sial

Arjun Bahadur Thapa (Nepali: अर्जुन बहादुर थापा; born 12 January 1956) is a Nepali diplomat and former General Secretary of SAARC.

== Personal life ==
He is the eighth descendant of Anglo-Nepalese war Bhakti Thapa Bhakti Thapa.

== Education ==
He completed his master's degree in International Law (Honours) at Peoples' Friendship University, Moscow, in 1983 and a diploma in Environmental Management at the University of Adelaide, Australia, in 1994. He studied in Moscow for 6 years, then leaving to Nepal.

== Career ==
Thapa has held many positions during his career. He was the Secretary General of SAARC, and was foreign secretary of the Republic of Nepal. :

- Secretary general of SAARC (1 March 2014 – 1 March 2017)
- Foreign Secretary, Ministry of Foreign Affairs of Nepal (21 July 2013 – February 2014)
- Joint Secretary, Head of Regional Organization Division (SAARC & BIMSTEC) and Spokesperson, Ministry of Foreign Affairs of Nepal (April 2012 – July 21, 2013)
- Joint Secretary, Head of Europe-Americas Division, Administration Division, SAARC and BIMSTEC and Spokesperson, Ministry of Foreign Affairs of Nepal (February 2012 – April 2013)
- Ambassador Extraordinary and Plenipotentiary of Nepal to the United Arab Emirates (December 2007 – January 2012)
- Joint Secretary, Head of the SAARC and Administration Divisions and Spokesperson, Ministry of Foreign Affairs of Nepal (February 2007 – December 2007)
- Deputy Permanent Representative/Minister Plenipotentiary, Permanent Mission of Nepal to the UN, New York (August 2006 – February 2007)
- Charge d' Affaires, a.i., Permanent Mission of Nepal to the UN, New York (November 2005 – August 2006)
- Deputy Permanent Representative/ Minister Plenipotentiary, Permanent Mission of Nepal to the UN, New York (December 2002 – November 2005)
- Joint Secretary, East, South East, Far East and the Pacific Division, Ministry of Foreign Affairs of Nepal (Joined the Diplomatic Service through open competition) (June 1999 – December 2002)
- Under Secretary, International Law and Treaties Division, Ministry of Law and Justice (1994–99)
- Assistant Secretary, International Law and Treaties Division, Ministry of Law and Justice (1993–94)
- Section Officer, International Law and Treaties Division Ministry of Law and Justice (1983–93)
