= Bernard Tilakaratna =

Senior diplomat and bureaucrat of the Sri Lankan government

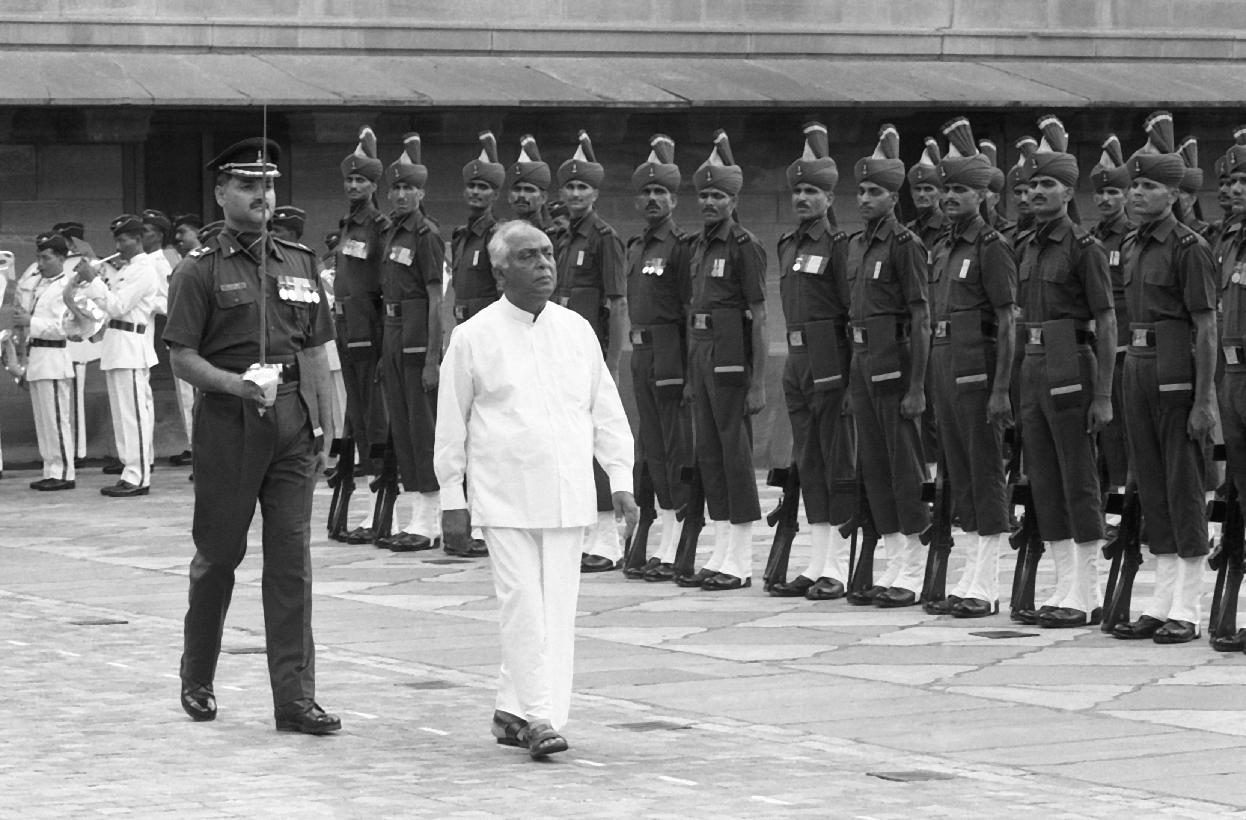
Tilakaratna (wearing white suit) in 1994

Bernard Tilakaratna, SLOS (1927–2004) was a senior diplomat and bureaucrat of the Sri Lankan government. He was an ambassador to many countries and prior to retirement was the permanent secretary to the Ministry of Foreign Affairs.

== Early life ==
He was born on 8 December 1927 in Sri Lanka and schooled at St Thomas' College, Mount Lavinia. He then enrolled into the University of Ceylon, where he obtained his B.A. Degree.

== Diplomatic career ==
He joined the Ceylon Foreign Service in May 1951. In various capacities, he served in the Sri Lanka Foreign Ministry and on missions abroad.

Tilakaratna was in India during the height of the terrorist conflict in Sri Lanka and had to negotiate with the Indian Government on many occasions. In Thimphu, Bhutan, he attended peace talks with the terrorist organisation, Liberation Tamil Tigers Eelam (LTTE)

He was appointed as Foreign Secretary to the Ministry of Sri Lanka, which he served under President Ranasinghe Premadasa. He was the first Foreign Secretary to be appointed from the ranks of career diplomats of the Sri Lanka Foreign Service.

=== Posts held ===
- March 1989 – August 1994: Foreign Secretary, Ministry of Foreign Affairs, Colombo
- August 1982- February 1989: High Commissioner, India (concurrently to Bhutan, Nepal)
- June 1980 – July 1982: Director General, Ministry of Foreign Affairs, Colombo
- September 1974 – May 1980: Ambassador, Japan (concurrently to South Korea and Philippines)
- March 1974 – August 1974: Director General, Ministry of Foreign Affairs, Colombo
- January 1971 – February 1974: Director of Foreign Relations (Europe, then Asia & Africa), Colombo
- December 1968 – December 1970: Deputy High Commissioner, New Delhi
- August 1966 – November 1968: Deputy Permanent Representative, United Nations, New York
- January 1965 – July 1966: Charge d'affairs: Rio de Janeiro
- January 1963 – December 1964: Chief of Protocol, Ministry of Foreign Affairs, Colombo
- March 1961 – December 1962: First Secretary, New Delhi
- April 1960 – February 1961: First Secretary, Moscow
- June 1958 – March 1960: Second Secretary, Paris
- October 1956- May 1958: Assistant Secretary, Ministry of Foreign Affairs, Colombo
- August 1953 – September 1956: Trade Commissioner, India
- September 1952 – July 1953: Official Secretary, Jakarta
- June 1952 – August 1952: Attache, Rangoon

== Family ==
He has two daughters and a son. The elder daughter, Mrs. Shiranthi Wimalaguna, is married to Dr. Dharmapala Wimalaguna and resides in Australia. The younger daughter, Mrs.Krishanthi Weerakoon is married to Mr.Esala Weerakoon who is the former Secretary General of SAARC. Esala Weerakoon is the son of another well-known Sri Lankan civil servant, Mr. Bradman Weerakoon. His son Prasanna Tilakaratna is an Anaesthetist and resides in the UK.

== Death ==
He died on 30 September 2004 from a long-standing illness (Lymphoma).
