= SAARC Meteorological Research Centre =

Bangladeshi research center

- Formation: 1995
- Dissolved: 2015
- Headquarters: Dhaka, Bangladesh
- Region served: Bangladesh
- Official language: Bengali

The SAARC Meteorological Research Centre was a meteorological research centre in Dhaka, Bangladesh which was operated by the South Asian Association for Regional Cooperation.

== History ==
The SAARC Meteorological Research Centre was established on 2 January 1995 by the South Asian Association for Regional Cooperation.

Brigadier General Shah Md Sultan Uddin Iqbal was appointed the Chairperson of the SAARC Meteorological Research Centre in November 2007.

In 2008, the SAARC Meteorological Research Centre started providing future climate scenario predictions for South Asia. The development was announced by the Director General of SAARC Meteorological Research Centre, Kazi Imtiaz Hossain.

In 2010, it was announced that the SAARC Meteorological Research Centre would create the SAARC Monsoon Initiative to study monsoon weather.

In 2015, the SAARC Meteorological Research Centre was closed permanently to be replaced by SAARC Environment and Disaster Management Centre. The centre had published 150 research papers. The staff were surprised by the decision and requested the government of Bangladesh to transfer them to Bangladeshi government research institutes. The SAARC Forestry Centre, based in Bhutan, and SAARC Coastal Zone Management Centre, based in Maldives, were also merged into the SAARC Environment and Disaster Management Centre, based in Gujarat, India.
