= Nihal Rodrigo =

Sri Lankan politician

Nihal Rodrigo is a public servant from Sri Lanka who served as Secretary General of the South Asian Association for Regional Cooperation from 1 January 1999 to 10 January 2002 and Foreign Secretary of Sri Lanka. He also served as Ambassador of Sri Lanka to China and Permanent Representative of Sri Lanka to the United Nations.
