= Abul Ahsan =

Bangladeshi diplomat

- আবুল আহসান
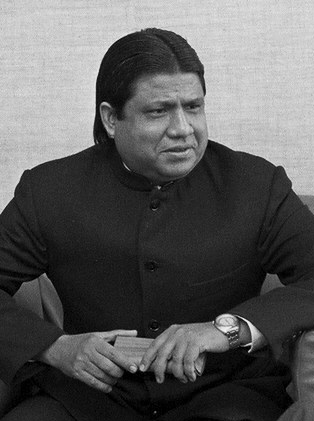
- Abul Ahsan at the European Union in Brussels (1977)

1st SAARC Secretary General
- In office 16 January 1987 – 15 August 1989
- Preceded by: Office established
- Succeeded by: Kant Kishore Bhargava

Ambassador of Bangladesh to the United States
- In office 25 November 1988 – 17 October 1991
- Preceded by: A. H. S. Ataul Karim
- Succeeded by: Humayun Kabir

High Commissioner of Bangladesh to Pakistan
- In office 16 April 1984 – 22 January 1987
- Preceded by: Quazi Golam Dastgir
- Succeeded by: C. M. Shafi Sami

Ambassador of Bangladesh to Italy
- In office 30 April 1980 – December 1982
- Preceded by: Khan Shamsur Rahman
- Succeeded by: Reaz Rahman

High Commissioner of Bangladesh to India
- In office 21 November 1978 – 1980
- Preceded by: Khan Shamsur Rahman
- Succeeded by: A. K. Khandker

Ambassador of Bangladesh to Belgium and the European Union
- In office 30 March 1977 – 14 November 1978
- Preceded by: Sanaul Huq
- Succeeded by: Faruq Ahmed Choudhury

Personal details
- Born: 1 December 1936
- Died: 7 December 2008 (aged 71) Dhaka, Bangladesh
- Education: University of Dhaka; Fletcher School of Law and Diplomacy
- Occupation: Diplomat

Abul Ahsan (28 December 1936 – 7 December 2008) was a Bangladeshi diplomat. He served as the ambassador of Bangladesh to Belgium and the European Union during 1977–1978.

== Education ==
Abul Ahsan secured first class in M.A in economics from the Dhaka University (1959) and M.A in international relations from the Fletcher School of Law and Diplomacy (1962). He stood first in the Civil and Foreign Services examination of Pakistan and joined the Foreign Service in 1961 and held several diplomatic positions. He completed his secondary school certificate from Noakhali Zilla School.

== Career ==
After Bangladesh's independence, Abul Ahsan served in the Bangladeshi Foreign Service for 34 years, ending his career as the Bangladeshi Ambassador to Washington, DC. He served as the country's Ambassador and Deputy Permanent Representative to the UN Ambassador to Poland, Italy, Pakistan and the United States (1991–93). He was the first secretary-general of the South Asian Association for Regional Cooperation (SAARC) (1987–89) as well as Foreign Secretary of Bangladesh (1989–91). He was one of the 15 members of the Council of Eminent Persons established by the Summit meeting of the Organization of Islamic Countries (OIC) in 1994 to report on the working of the specialized bodies of the organization. From 1996 to 1999, he served as a member of the executive board of the United Nations Educational Scientific and Cultural Organization (UNESCO).

Abul Ahsan served as vice-president at the Independent University Bangladesh . He was chairperson of the Fair Election Monitoring Alliance (FEMA) and was involved in governance and election-related activities for several years, and also held the position of President of Center for Democracy a citizen's organization devoted to the promotion of good governance and democracy.

Abul Ahsan represented Bangladesh at a large number of meetings and conferences including UN General Assembly and Security Council Sessions, Summit and Ministerial level meetings of the Commonwealth, the Non-aligned Movement and the Organization of Islamic Conference (OIC).

Abul Ahsan is the author of the book SAARC: A Perspective and jointly edited two publications by Independent University Bangladesh entitled Education in a Rapidly Changing World: Focus on Bangladesh and Indigenous Peoples of Bangladesh. He co-chaired a study conducted by the Asia Foundation which was published in 2004 under the title America's role in Asia.

Abul Ahsan died on 7 December 2008 after going into cardiac arrest.
