= Chenkyab Dorji =

Bhutanese diplomat

Lyonpo Chenkyab Dorji is a Bhutanese diplomat. He had been the secretary-general of the South Asian Association for Regional Cooperation from March 1, 2005 to February 29, 2008.

== Biography ==
=== Early life ===
Born in 1943 in Haa District of western Bhutan, H.E. Mr. Chenkyab Dorji graduated in Forestry from Dehradun, India in 1963. He then completed his master's in forestry science from Forestry Research Institute, Dehradun in 1967. Subsequently, he had undertaken training at various world-renowned institutions, including the Swiss Technical Institute in Zurich, Switzerland, and the Wood Technology and Transport in Austria. He is a pioneer forester.

=== Political life ===
Mr. Dorji joined the civil service of Bhutan in 1961 in the Department of Forests and later served as the first Director until 1984. From 1983 to 1985 he served as Director of the Board of International Center for Integrated Mountain Development (ICIMOD), which is located in Kathmandu, Nepal.

In 1984, he was appointed as the Joint Secretary of the Department of Trade, Commerce, and Industry and Mines of Bhutan. A year later, he was promoted to Secretary of the Ministry of Trade, Industries and Forests. In 1986, he served both as the Secretary, National Planning Commission and Secretary, Department of Agriculture.

He held the office of the Vice-chairman and Deputy Minister of Planning Commission (independent charge) during the period of 1988-1991. He was then elevated to the post of Cabinet Minister for Planning and served as its Chairman from 1991 through 1998. He also served as Chairman of the National Environment Commission from 1992 to 1998. During his Chairmanship of above Commissions, two key documents were prepared and published i.e. Bhutan 2020 – A vision for peace, prosperity and happiness 1996, and the Middle Path – National Environment Strategy for Bhutan.

== Recognition ==
Mr. Dorji also served as Member of several key institutions of Royal Government of Bhutan. He was conferred a number of awards in recognition of his outstanding contributions during his career.

Prior to joining the SAARC Secretariat, Mr. Dorji served as Bhutan’s first resident Ambassador to Thailand at the Royal Bhutanese Embassy in Bangkok. He was concurrently accredited as Ambassador to Singapore, Australia and was also responsible for Bhutan’s relations with other South East Asian Countries.

Dorji has to his credit two titles published i.e. The National Forest Policy (1974), and The Bhutan Forest Act (1969).

== Achievements ==
Dorji was the first Secretary General of SAARC who comes from Bhutan. It may be added that during the first cycle, Bhutan did not nominate a dignitary for the same position.

== Honours ==
- Bhutan :
  - The Royal Red Scarf (1975).
  - The Royal Orange Scarf (1991).
  - Member of the Royal Order of Bhutan (17 December 2017).
