= Amjad Hussain B. Sial =

13th SAARC Secretary General

His Excellency Amjad Hussain B. Sial
- امجد حسین بی۔ سیال
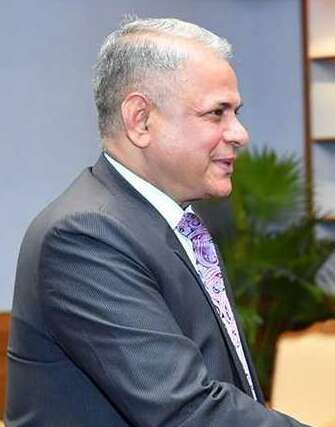
- Sial in 2018

13th SAARC Secretary General
- In office 1 March 2017 – 29 February 2020
- Preceded by: Arjun Bahadur Thapa
- Succeeded by: Esala Ruwan Weerakoon

Amjad Hussain B. Sial (Urdu: امجد حسین بی۔ سیال) is a Pakistani diplomat who served SAARC Secretary General from March 2017 to February 2020.

== Education ==
Sial received a master's degree in Defence and Strategic Studies from National Defence University, Pakistan.

== Career ==
On 1 March 2017, he replaced Arjun Bahadur Thapa and assumed the office of SAARC Secretary General. Before becoming SAARC Secretary General, he was special secretary at Ministry of Foreign Affairs.

He had served as the ambassador to Tajikistan from 2011 to 2014 and permanent representative of Pakistan to the United Nations.
