= Ahmed Saleem (diplomat) =

Maldivian diplomat

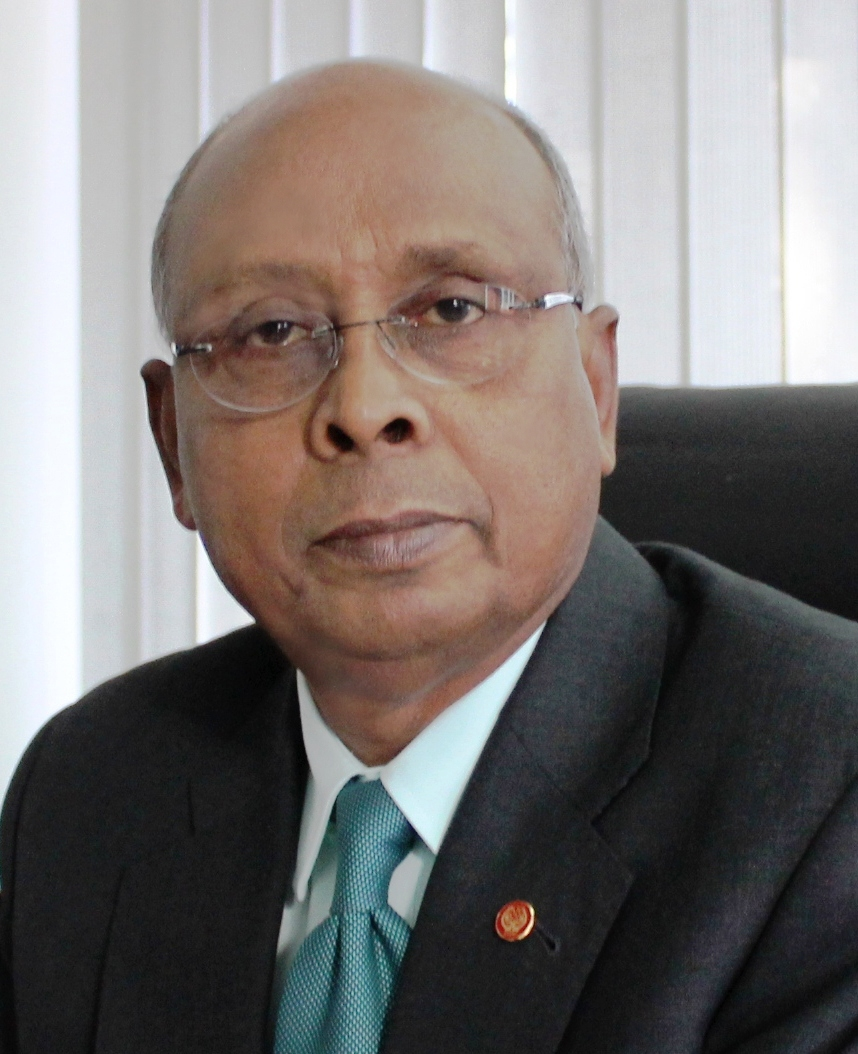

11th Secretary-General of SAARC
- In office 12 March 2012 – 28 February 2014
- Preceded by: Fathimath Saeed (resigned)
- Succeeded by: Arjun Bahadur Thapa

President of the Human Rights Commission of the Maldives
- In office November 2006 – August 2010

Personal details
- Born: Male', Maldives
- Spouse: Ayesha Saleem (m. 1971)
- Children: Fezlyn; Rozlyn; Naweez; Zubin

Ahmed Saleem is a Maldivian diplomat who served as an Ambassador-at-Large at the Ministry of Foreign Affairs of the Maldives. Previously, he was the 11th Secretary-General of the South Asian Association for Regional Cooperation (SAARC) from 2012 to 2014. From May 2015 to February 2020 he served as High Commissioner of Maldives to Pakistan, and non-resident Ambassador accredited to Nepal.
