= Naeem U. Hasan =

Pakistani diplomat

Naeem Ul Hasan is a Pakistani diplomat who served as the sixth secretary-general of the South Asian Association for Regional Cooperation (SAARC) from January 1, 1996, to December 31, 1998.

Prior to being nominated as the secretary-general, he served as Ambassador of Pakistan in Syria stationed at Damascus between 1990 and 1995. He retired in May 2001 as Ambassador of Pakistan in Stockholm, Sweden.
