= Esala Weerakoon =

14th SAARC Secretary General

Esala Ruwan Weerakoon
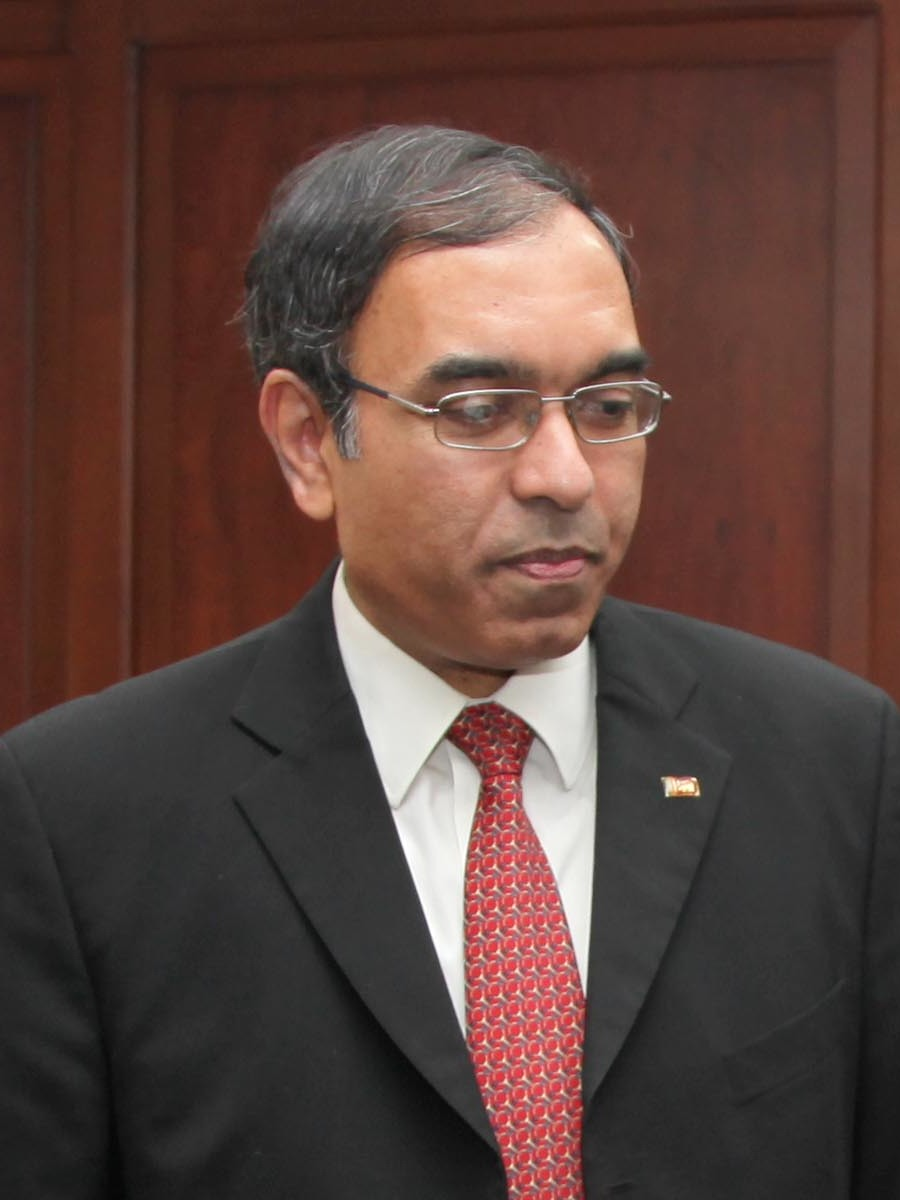

14th SAARC Secretary General
- In office 1 March 2020 – 3 March 2023
- Preceded by: Amjad Hussain B. Sial
- Succeeded by: Golam Sarwar

Personal details
- Relatives: Bradman Weerakoon (father); Damayanthi Gunasekara (mother); Krishanti Weerakoon (spouse); Bernard Tilakaratna (father-in-law)
- Education: University of Kelaniya; London School of Economics

Esala Ruwan Weerakoon is a Sri Lankan diplomat who was the SAARC Secretary General, in office since March 2020 to October 2023. He served as permanent secretary to the Ministry of Tourism Development and permanent secretary of the Ministry of Foreign Affairs and as Sri Lankan High Commissioner to India and ambassador to Norway.

== Early life ==
Born to a civil servant Bradman Weerakoon and Damayanthi Gunasekara, he was educated at Royal College, Colombo. He studied economics at the University of Kelaniya and undertook post-graduate studies at London School of Economics.

== Career ==
Joining the Sri Lanka Foreign Service in 1988, he served in several foreign postings in London, Canberra, Kuala Lumpur and Paris. He served as charge d'affaires at Sri Lankan embassies in Washington, D.C. and Tokyo. During his tenure of service at the Ministry of Foreign Affairs, he served in different capacities, including as the Director General of the Economic Affairs Division and the Director General of the East Asia & Pacific Division. He also held office as Additional Secretary (External Relations) at the Ministry of Economic Development and as Additional Secretary (Special Projects) at the Ministry of Housing & Samurdhi. He has served as ambassador to Norway, High Commissioner to Seychelles and was appointed High Commissioner of Sri Lanka to India in November 2015.
