= Yadav Kant Silwal =

Nepali politician

Yadav Kant Silwal (Nepali: यादव कान्त सिलवाल) is a Nepalese diplomat and former Foreign Secretary, who also served as the Secretary General of the South Asian Association for Regional Cooperation from January 1, 1994 to December 31, 1995. A 1960 batch member of Nepalese Foreign Service, he has served as Nepal's Ambassador to Russia before becoming Foreign Secretary in 1993. His earlier assignments were in Rome, Beijing and New York.
