= Visions of the 21st century =

1995 speech by Carl Sagan

"Visions of the 21st Century" is a speech delivered by Carl Sagan at the fiftieth anniversary celebration of the United Nations on October 24, 1995 (United Nations Day), in New York in the Cathedral of St. John the Divine.

== Speech ==
In the introduction, Sagan discusses the human unity that is present in the world despite its vast human diversity. He points out that we as humans are all cousins that can be traced back through human ancestry in east Africa. The theme of Sagan's speech promoted the importance of fostering a Global Community. This theme of Visions of the 21st Century represents the overarching theme of the U.N.'s fiftieth anniversary celebration which was "We The Peoples of the United Nations...United for a Better World". He stresses the importance of maintaining a healthy Global Environment, as changes in the global environment are a common threat to all of humanity. The change in the Global Environment he focuses on is climate change.

He also elaborates on the great power that modern technology allows each to nation to possess. He praises the advances in medical technology of the world particularly. Yet, Sagan warns that the mix of technological power and ignorance has the potential to lead to disaster. Thus, this enormous power must be guarded against misuse. To do this, Sagan suggests that widespread knowledge of science and technology is beneficial. Sagan discusses the minuscule presence of the Earth within the vast scale of the cosmos, and how it is a delusion to believe we as humans are somehow elite in the universe. Sagan implores humanity to protect and cherish this earth that we know, as it is solely the responsibility of humanity alone.
