= Sequential time =

A sequential time is one in which the numbers form a normal sequence, such as 1:02:03 4/5/06 (two minutes and three seconds past 1 am on 4 May 2006 (or April 5, 2006 in the United States) or the same time and date in the "06" year of any other century). Short sequential times such as 1:23:45 or 12:34:56 appear every day. Larger sequential times rarely appear, such as 12:34:56 7/8/90, or 01:23:45 on 6/7/89. These times can be dependent on the date format being used; the month/day format will produce different results from the day/month format.

This term, however, is not limited to simple counting. Other sequences, such as the decimal numbers of the mathematical constants π (3/14/1592), e (2/7/1828), and the square root of two (1/4/1421) are also noted. Number sequences such as the Fibonacci sequence (1/1/2358) can also be found in time stamps.

These dates are particularly popular with couples getting married who are seeking unique wedding and anniversary dates. Dates with repeating numbers such as July 7, 2007 "7/7/07" are also popular.

Palindromic times can also be observed, e.g. 10:02:10 on 11/01/2001 (two minutes and ten seconds after 10 am on 1 November 2001 in parts of the world using month/day format) was the first fully palindromic time sequence of the twenty-first century. The last palindromic time sequence was at 02:02:10 at 11/01/2020 (two minutes and twenty-one seconds past 2 am on 11 January 2020 in most of the world).

A sequential time occurred during Pi Day on 3/14/15 at 9:26:53.58979... following the sequence of pi to all digits.

== Historical events ==
- Prohibition ended in Finland April 5, 1932 at 10 am (5.4.32 10 o'clock)
- Chernobyl Nuclear Disaster occurred on April 26, 1986 at 01:23:45 MSK (UTC +3).
- Beijing Summer Olympics started on 8 August 2008 at 8.08:08 pm (8 is a lucky number in China)

== See also ==
- Square Root Day
- Numerology
