= Diplomat =

Person conducting diplomacy with another entity

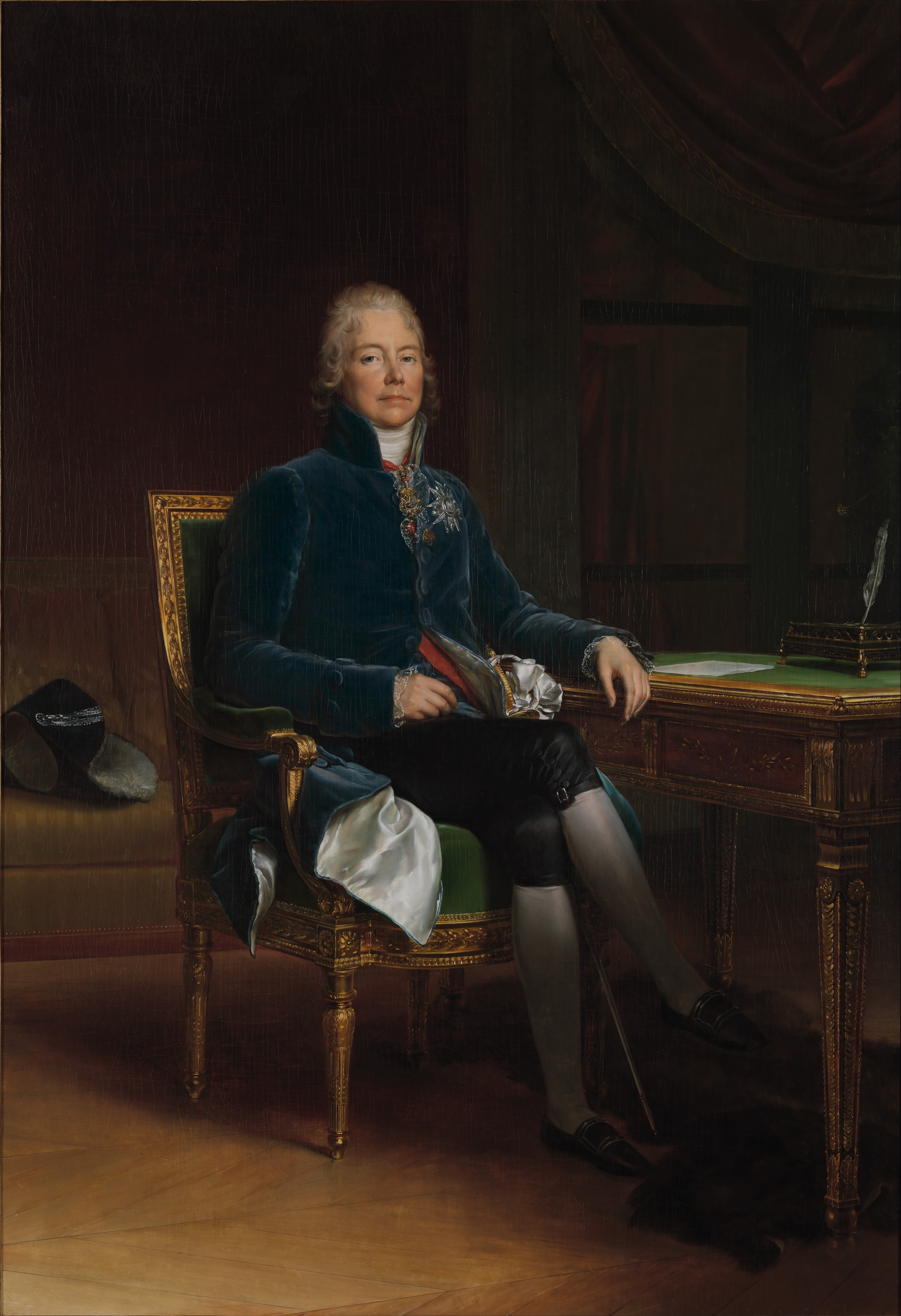
Portrait of Talleyrand by François Gérard, 1808. French statesman and Emperor Napoleon's chief diplomat Charles Maurice de Talleyrand-Périgord (1754–1838) is widely considered one of the most skilled diplomats of all time

A diplomat (from Ancient Greek: δίπλωμα, romanized: diploma) is a person appointed by a state, intergovernmental, or nongovernmental institution to conduct diplomacy with one or more other states or international organizations.

The main functions of diplomats are representation and protection of the interests and nationals of the sending state; initiation and facilitation of strategic agreements, treaties and conventions; and promotion of information, trade and commerce, technology, and friendly relations. Seasoned diplomats of international repute are used in international organizations (for example, the United Nations, the world's largest diplomatic forum) as well as multinational companies for their experience in management and negotiating skills. Diplomats are members of foreign services and diplomatic corps of various nations of the world.

The sending state is required to get the consent of the receiving state for a person proposed to serve in key diplomatic positions such as an ambassador, also referred to as the head of the mission. The receiving state of the proposed diplomat may accept the diplomat or refuse to accept the diplomat without having to provide reasons for its refusal or acceptance of the person. While the head of the mission or any member of the diplomatic staff is already on duty in the receiving state, the receiving state may still decide at anytime that the person is no longer wanted in the state and is considered persona non grata. When this happens, the sending state may discharge the person.

Diplomats are the oldest form of any of the foreign policy institutions of a state, predating foreign ministers and ministerial offices by centuries. They usually have diplomatic immunity, and in their official travels they usually use a diplomatic passport or, for UN officials, a United Nations laissez-passer.

== Terminology ==
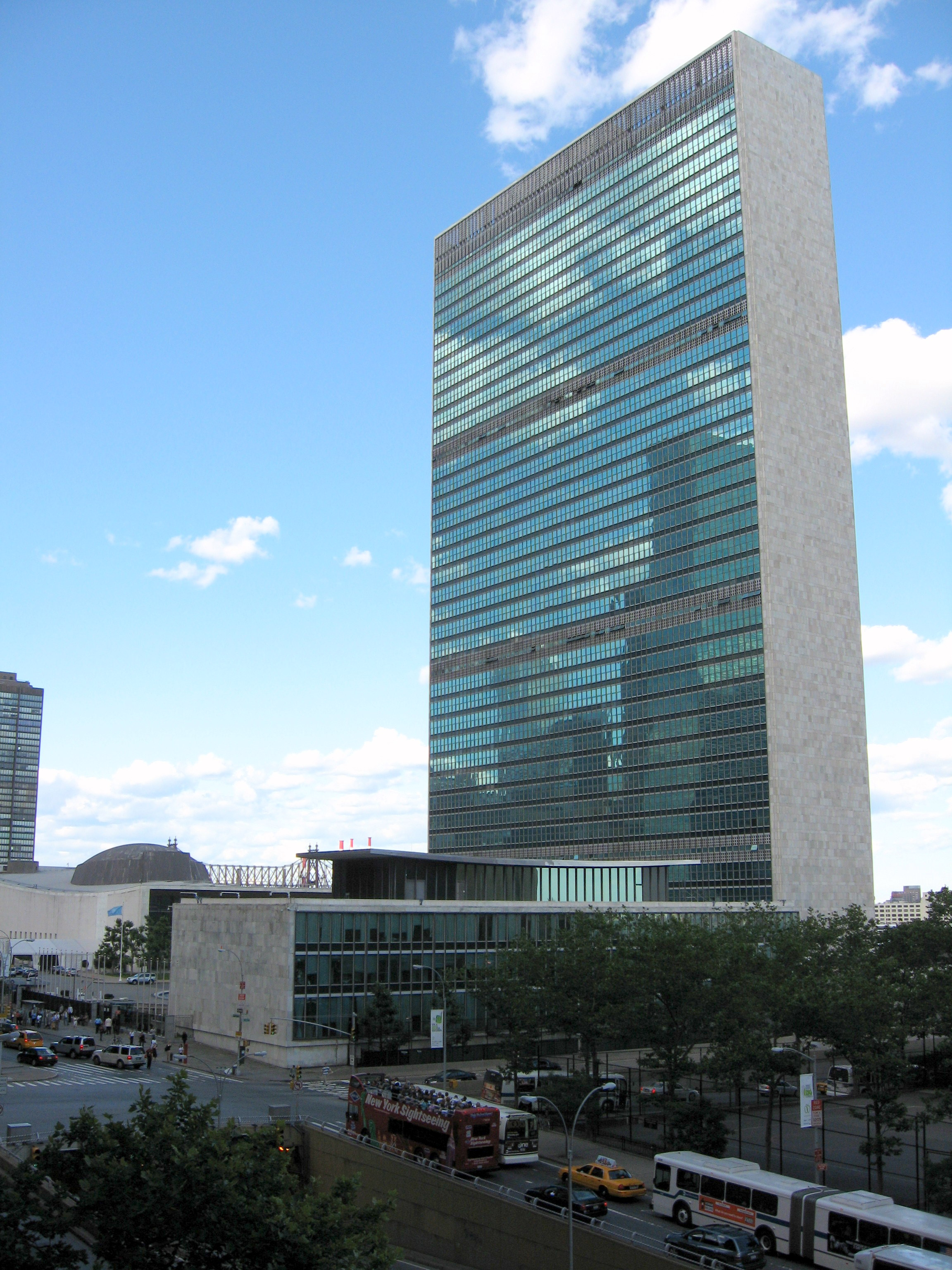
The headquarters of the United Nations in New York City, the world's largest international diplomatic organization.

The regular use of permanent diplomatic representation began in the states of 15th-century Italy. However the terms "diplomacy" and "diplomat" appeared during the French Revolution. "Diplomat" is derived from the Greek διπλωμάτης (diplōmátēs), the holder of a diploma, referring to diplomats' documents of accreditation from their sovereign. "Diplomatist", which is another English term for "diplomat" uncommonly used today, is a more direct translation from the French.

Diplomats themselves and historians often refer to the foreign ministry by its address: the Ballhausplatz (Vienna), the Quai d’Orsay (Paris), the Wilhelmstraße (Berlin); Itamaraty (from the former Itamaraty Palace in Rio de Janeiro, now transferred to Brasília since 1970) and Foggy Bottom (Washington). For imperial Russia to 1917 it was the Choristers' Bridge (St Petersburg). The Italian ministry was called "the Consulta".

== Career diplomats and political appointees ==
Though any person can be appointed by the State's national government to conduct said state's relations with other States or international organizations, a number of States maintain an institutionalized group of career diplomats—that is, public servants with a steady professional connection to the country's foreign ministry. The term career diplomat is used worldwide in opposition to political appointees (that is, people from any other professional backgrounds who may equally be designated by an official government to act as diplomats abroad). While officially posted to an embassy or delegation in a foreign country or accredited to an international organization, both career diplomats and political appointees enjoy the same diplomatic immunities, as well as United Nations officials. Ceremonial heads of state commonly act as diplomats on behalf of their nation, usually following instructions from their head of Government. Sasson Sofer argues that, "The ideal diplomat, by the nature of his mission, is destined to clash with the expedient needs of his country's politics." On the other hand, professional politicians often ridicule diplomats. President John F. Kennedy often denigrated career diplomats as "weak and effeminate" and moved foreign policy decisions out of their hands.

== Diplomatic ranks ==
Every diplomat, while posted abroad, will be classified in one of the ranks of diplomats (secretary, counselor, minister, ambassador, envoy, or chargé d'affaires) as regulated by international law (namely, by the Vienna Convention on Diplomatic Relations of 1961).

Diplomats can be contrasted with consuls who help businesspeople, and military attachés. They represent not the foreign ministry but other branches of their government, but lack the diplomat's role in dealing with foreign policy at the highest level.

== Function ==
Diplomats in posts collect and report information that could affect national interests, often with advice about how the home-country government should respond. Then, once any policy response has been decided in the home country's capital, posts bear major responsibility for implementing it. Diplomats have the job of conveying, in the most persuasive way possible, the views of the home government to the governments to which they are accredited and, in doing so, of trying to convince those governments to act in ways that suit home-country interests. In this way, diplomats are part of the beginning and the end of each loop in the continuous process through which foreign policy develops.

In general, it has become harder for diplomats to act autonomously. Diplomats use secure communication systems, such as emails, and mobile telephones that allow reaching even the most reclusive head of mission. This technology also gives diplomats the capacity for more immediate input about the policy-making processes in the home capital.

Secure email has transformed the contact between diplomats and the ministry. It is less likely to leak, and enables more personal contact than the formal cablegram, with its wide distribution and impersonal style.

=== Advocacy ===
The home country will usually send instructions to a diplomatic post on what foreign policy goals to pursue, but decisions on tactics – who needs to be influenced, what will best persuade them, who are potential allies and adversaries, and how it can be done – are for the diplomats overseas to make.

In this operation, the intelligence, integrity, cultural understanding, and energy of individual diplomats become critical. If competent, they will have developed relationships grounded in trust and mutual understanding with influential members of the country in which they are accredited. They will have worked hard to understand the motives, thought patterns and culture of the other side.

== Training ==
Most career diplomats have university degrees in international relations, political science, history, economics, or law. "Emotional intelligence" has recently become a component of many foreign service training programs.

== Status and public image ==
Diplomats have generally been considered members of an exclusive and prestigious profession. The public image of diplomats has been described as "a caricature of pinstriped men gliding their way around a never-ending global cocktail party". J. W. Burton has noted that "despite the absence of any specific professional training, diplomacy has a high professional status, due perhaps to a degree of secrecy and mystery." The state supports the high status, privileges, and self-esteem of its diplomats in order to support its own international status and position.

The high regard for diplomats is also due to most countries' conspicuous selection of diplomats, with regard to their professionalism and ability to behave according to a certain etiquette, in order to effectively promote their interests. Also, international law grants diplomats extensive privileges and immunities, which further distinguishes the diplomat from the status of an ordinary citizen.

== Psychology and loyalty ==
While posted overseas, there is a danger that diplomats may become disconnected from their own country and culture. Sir Harold Nicolson acknowledged that diplomats can become "denationalised, internationalised and therefore dehydrated, an elegant empty husk". Nicolson also claimed that personal motives often influenced the diplomatic pursuit of the national interest. For example, he wrote: "Nobody who has not actually watched statesmen dealing with each other can have any real idea of the immense part played in human affairs by such unavowable and often unrecognisable causes as lassitude, affability, personal affection or dislike, misunderstanding, deafness or incomplete command of a foreign language, vanity, social engagements, interruptions and momentary health."

To prevent disconnection and apathy from their own state, many foreign services mandate their employees to return to their home countries in between period serving abroad.

== International Day of Diplomats ==
Diplomats have started celebrating International Day of Diplomats on October 24 since 2017. The idea of celebrating International Day of Diplomats on the day the United Nations was founded was proposed by Indian diplomat Abhay Kumar to mark the occasion as diplomacy becoming the principal means of resolving disputes.

== See also ==
- Citizen diplomacy
- Cultural diplomacy
- Digital diplomacy
- Peace makers
- Peacemaking
- Preventive diplomacy
