= WTD (disambiguation) =

WTD is World Toilet Day.

WTD may also refer to:

- Watch the Duck, an American band
- White Trash Debutantes, an American rock band
- Working Time Directive, a directive of the European Union
- World Theatre Day
- West End Airport's IATA code
- Watertable depth, the depth of the upper surface of the zone of water saturation in the ground (see also water table).
- World Teachers Day
- World Television Day
