= Square Root Day =

Unofficial holiday

Square Root Day is an unofficial holiday celebrated on days when both the day of the month and the month are the square root of the last two digits of the year. For example, the last Square Root Day was Monday, May 5, 2025 (5/5/25), and the next Square Root Day will be Friday, June 6, 2036 (6/6/36). The final Square Root Day of the 21st century will occur on Tuesday, September 9, 2081. Square Root Days fall upon the same nine dates each century. Notably, May 5, 2025, which also coincided with Cinco de Mayo, is a perfect Square Root Day, because 5 multiplied by 5 equals 25, and 45 multiplied by 45 equals 2025.

Ron Gordon, a Redwood City, California, high school teacher, created the first Square Root Day for Wednesday, September 9, 1981 (9/9/81). Gordon remains the holiday's publicist, sending news releases to world media outlets. Gordon's daughter set up a Facebook group where people can share how they were celebrating the day.

One suggested way of celebrating the holiday is by eating radishes or other root vegetables cut into shapes with square cross sections (thus creating a "square root").

== Full list ==
Square Root Day occurs on the following dates each century:

- 1/1/01
- 2/2/04
- 3/3/09
- 4/4/16
- 5/5/25
- 6/6/36
- 7/7/49
- 8/8/64
- 9/9/81

== See also ==
- Mole Day
- Pi Day
- Sequential Day
