= Mole Day =

Unofficial holiday related to chemistry

- Observed by: Chemists, Chemistry enthusiasts, Students
- Type: Academic
- Significance: Avogadro constant
- Begins: 6:02 am on October 23
- Ends: 6:02 pm on October 23
- Date: October 23
- Next time: 23 October 2027
- Frequency: Annual

Mole Day is an unofficial holiday celebrated among chemists, chemistry students, and chemistry enthusiasts on October 23 between 6:02 a.m. and 6:02 p.m., making the date 6:02 10/23 in either MDY or YMD date formats. The time and date are derived from the Avogadro constant, which is approximately 6.02×10^{23}, defining the number of particles (atoms or molecules) in one mole (mol) of substance, one of the seven base SI units.

== Overview ==
Mole Day originated from a celebration by educator Margaret Christoph. She wrote an article about her experiences in The Science Teacher in the 1980s. Inspired by this article, Maurice Oehler, a high school chemistry teacher from Prairie du Chien, Wisconsin, founded the National Mole Day Foundation (NMDF) on May 15, 1991.

Many high schools around the United States, South Africa, Australia, and Canada celebrate Mole Day as a way to get their students interested in chemistry, with various activities often related to chemistry or moles.

The American Chemical Society sponsors National Chemistry Week, which occurs from the Sunday through Saturday during which October 23 falls. This makes Mole Day an integral part of National Chemistry Week.

== See also ==
- Pi Day
- Square Root Day
