= Programmer's Day =

World Programmer's Day

- Observed by: Worldwide
- Type: International
- Date: 256th (hexadecimal 100th, or the 2^{8}th) day of each year (September 13 in common years, and September 12 in leap years) in Russia
- 2025 date: 2025-09-13
- Duration: "1 day"
- Frequency: Annual
- First time: 2009
- Related to: Engineer's Day

Programmer's Day, also known as the Day of the Programmer and occasionally as Day 2^8, is an international professional day that is celebrated on the 256th (hexadecimal 100th, or the 2^{8}th) day of each year. This is September 13 in common years and September 12 in leap years.

The number 256 (2^{8}) was chosen because it is the number of distinct values that can be represented with a byte, a value well known to programmers. 256 is also the highest power of two that is less than 365 and 366, the number of days in a common year and leap year respectively.

== History ==
As early as 2002, this particular day was proposed by Valentin Balt and Michael Cherviakov (aka htonus), employees of Parallel Technologies (a software company), who tried to gather signatures for a petition to the government of Russia to recognize the day as the official Day of the Programmer.

On July 24, 2009, the Ministry of Communications and Mass Media of Russia issued a draft of an executive order on a new public holiday, the Day of the Programmer. On September 11, Russian president Dmitry Medvedev signed the decree.

== Variations ==
=== Chinese Programmer's Day ===
In China, the programmer's day is October 24, which has been established for many years.

The date was chosen because it can also be written as 1024, which is equal to 2^{10} and corresponds to the kibi (Ki) binary prefix. It is also a consistent date regardless of leap years.

== See also ==
- Engineer's Day
- Pi Day
- Secretary's Day
- System Administrator Appreciation Day
- Tau Day
- World Information Society Day

== Bibliography ==
- Президент Российской Федерации. Указ №1034 от 11 сентября 2009 г. «О дне программиста». Вступил в силу 11 сентября 2009 г.. Опубликован: "Российская Газета", №172, 15 сентября 2009 г.. (President of the Russian Federation. Decree #1034 of September 11, 2009 On the Day of the Programmer. Effective as of September 11, 2009.).
