= Pi Day =

Annual mathematical celebration on March 14

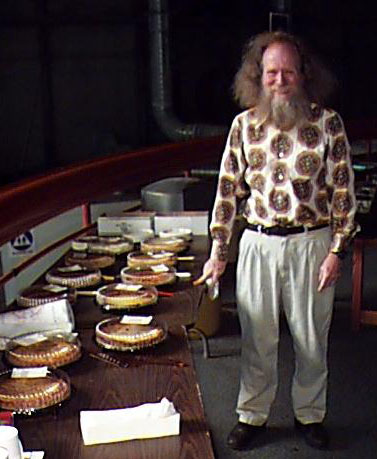
- Larry Shaw, the organizer of the first Pi Day celebration, at the Exploratorium in San Francisco
- Observed by: United States
- Type: Mathematical
- Significance: 3, 1, and 4 are the three most significant figures of π in its decimal representation.
- Celebrations: Pie eating, pi memorization competitions, discussions about π
- Date: March 14
- Next time: March 14, 2027
- Frequency: Annual
- First time: 1988
- Related to: Pi Approximation Day

Pi Day is an annual celebration of the mathematical constant $\pi$ (pi) with events mostly in the United States. Pi Day is observed on March 14 (the 3rd month) since 3, 1, and 4 are the first three significant figures of $\pi$ and was founded in 1988 by Larry Shaw, an employee of the Exploratorium, a science museum in San Francisco.

Celebrations often involve eating pie or holding pi recitation competitions. In 2009, the United States House of Representatives supported the designation of Pi Day. UNESCO's 40th General Conference designated Pi Day as the International Day of Mathematics in November 2019.

Other dates when people celebrate pi include Pi Approximation Day on July 22 (22/7 in the day/month format), an approximation of $\pi$; and June 28 (6.28), an approximation of 2$\pi$ or $\tau$ (tau).

== History ==
In 1988, the earliest known official or large-scale celebration of Pi Day was organized by Larry Shaw at the San Francisco Exploratorium, where Shaw worked as a physicist, with staff and public marching around one of its circular spaces, then consuming fruit pies. The Exploratorium continues to hold Pi Day celebrations.

On March 12, 2009, the U.S. House of Representatives passed a non-binding resolution (111 H. Res. 224), recognizing March 14, 2009, as National Pi Day. For Pi Day 2010, Google presented a Google Doodle celebrating the holiday, with the word Google laid over images of circles and pi symbols; and for the 30th anniversary in 2018, it was a Dominique Ansel pie with the circumference divided by its diameter.

Some observed the entire month of March 2014 (3/14) as "Pi Month". In the year 2015, March 14 was celebrated as "Super Pi Day". It had special significance, as the date is written as 3/14/15 in month/day/year format, or the first five digits of pi (3.1415). At 9:26:53, the date and time together represented the first ten digits of π, and later that second, "Pi Instant" represented all of π's digits.

== Observance ==
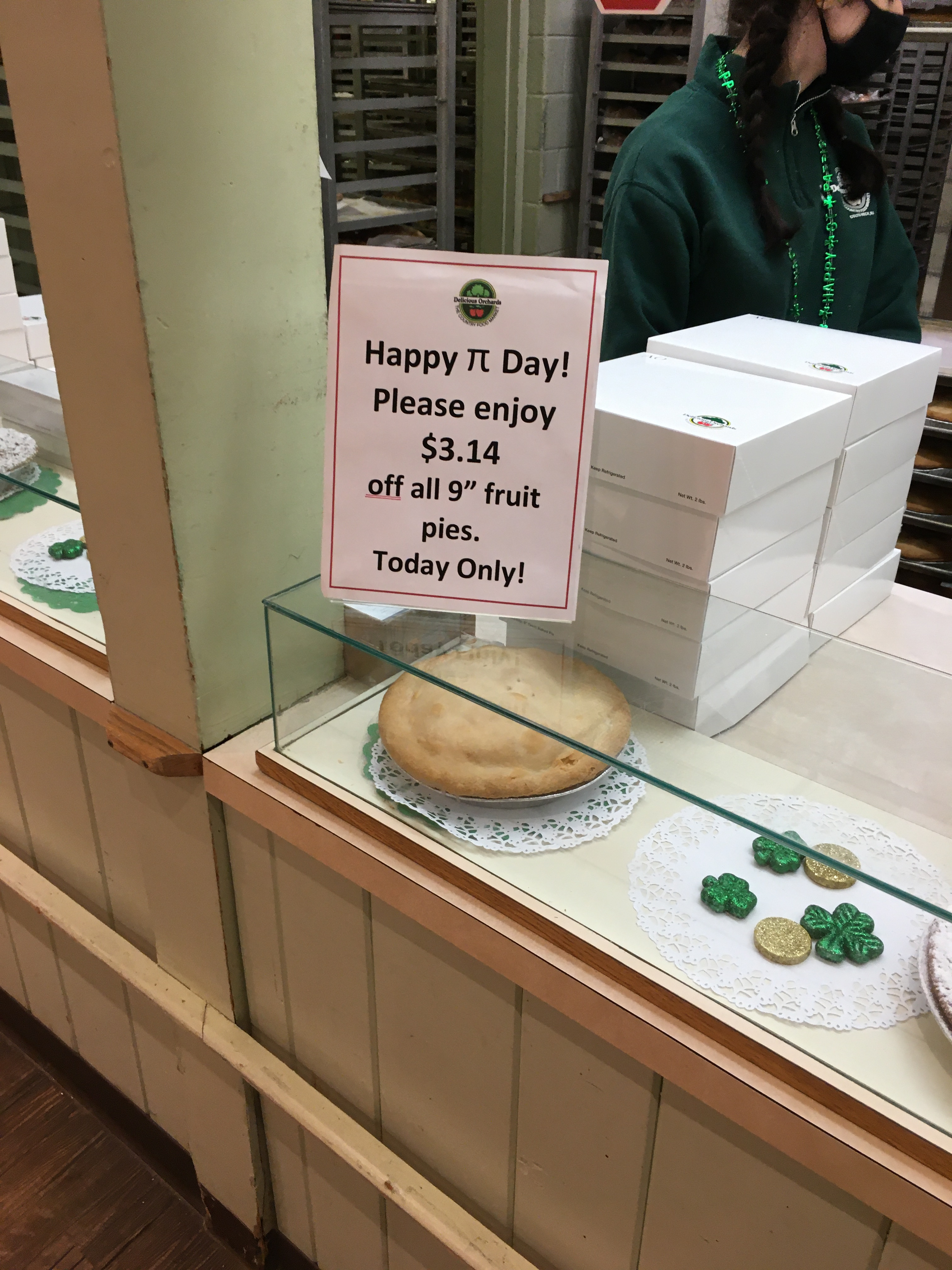
Pi Day related offering at Delicious Orchards, a country food market in Colts Neck, New Jersey

Pi Day has been observed in many ways, including eating pie, throwing pies and discussing the significance of the number π. The first two are due to a pun based on the words "pi" and "pie" being homophones in English ( /paɪ/), and the coincidental circular shape of many pies. Many pizza and pie restaurants offer discounts, deals, and free products on Pi Day. Also, some schools hold competitions as to which student can recall pi to the highest number of decimal places.

The Massachusetts Institute of Technology has often mailed its application decision letters to prospective students for delivery on Pi Day. Starting in 2012, MIT has announced it will post those decisions (privately) online on Pi Day at exactly 6:28 pm, which they have called "Tau Time", to honor the rival numbers π and 𝜏 equally. In 2015, the regular decisions were put online at 9:26 am, following that year's "pi minute", and in 2020, regular decisions were released at 1:59 pm, making the first six digits of pi.

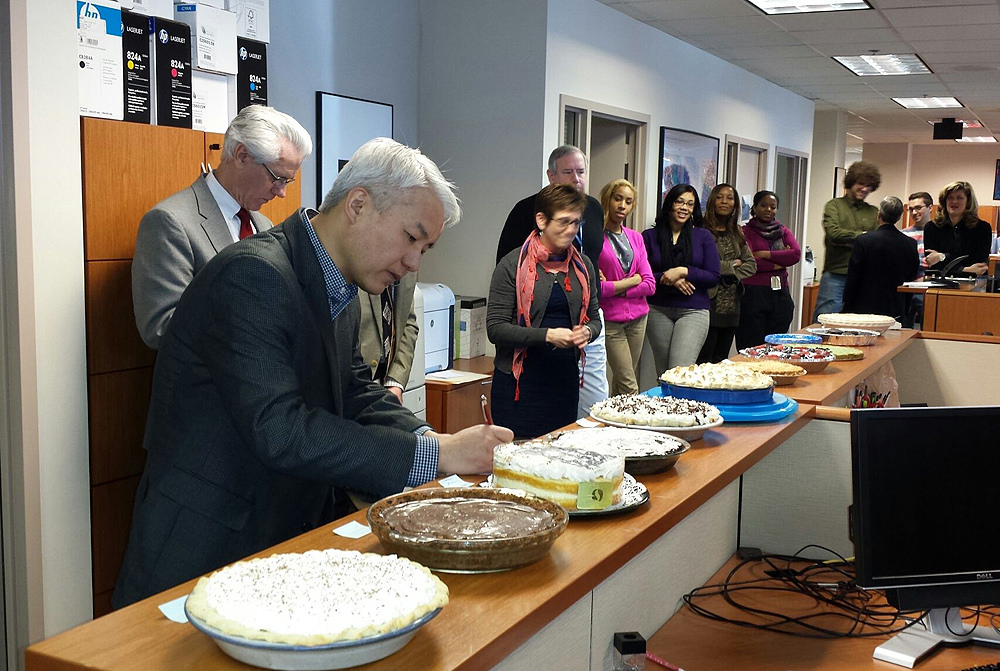
NSF employees celebrating Pi Day with a pie competition

Princeton, New Jersey, hosts numerous events in a combined celebration of Pi Day and Albert Einstein's birthday, which is also March 14. Einstein lived in Princeton for more than twenty years while working at the Institute for Advanced Study. In addition to pie eating and recitation contests, there is an annual Einstein look-alike contest.

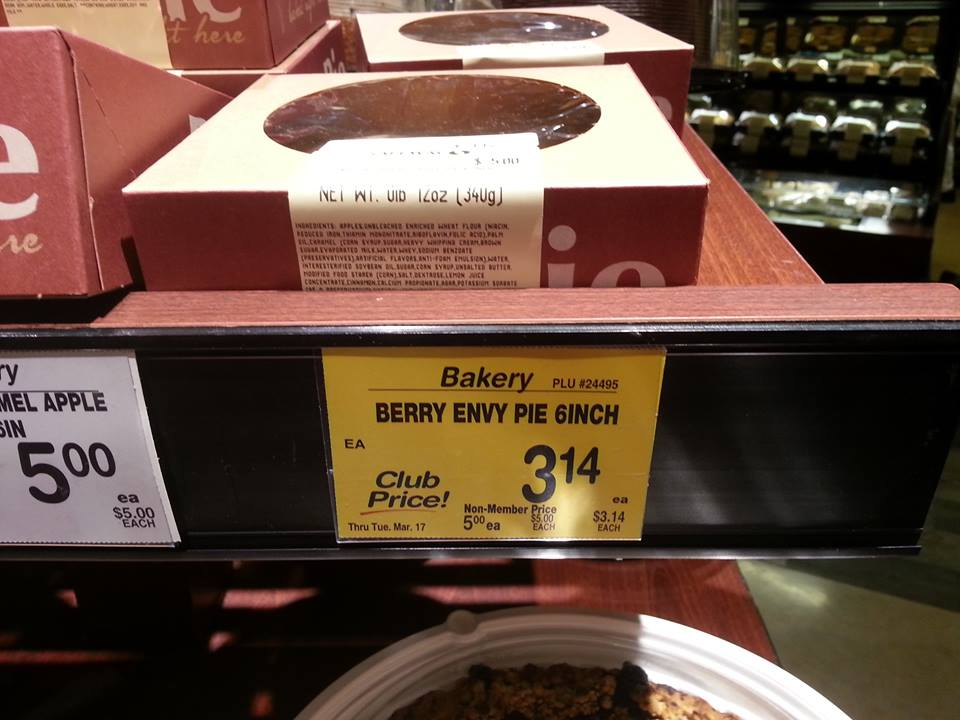
A grocery store selling pies for $3.14 on Pi Day, 2015

In 2024, the recreational mathematician Matt Parker and a team of hundreds of volunteers at City of London School spent six days calculating 139 correct digits of pi by hand, in what Parker claimed was "the biggest hand calculation in a century". On 15 August 2024, the main-belt asteroid 314159 Mattparker (Note: 314159 are the first six digits of Pi.) was named in his honor. The citation highlights Parker's biennial "Pi Day challenges", stating that they have helped to popularize mathematics.

== Alternative dates ==
Pi Day is frequently observed on March 14 (3/14 in the month/day date format, favoured by the USA), but related celebrations have been held on alternative dates.

Pi Approximation Day is observed on July 22 (22/7 in the day/month date format), since the fraction 22/7 is a common approximation of π, which is accurate to two decimal places and dates from Archimedes.

Tau Day, also known as Two-Pi Day, is observed on June 28 (6/28 in the month/day format). The number 𝜏, denoted by the Greek letter tau, is the ratio of a circle's circumference to its radius; it equals 2π, a common multiple in mathematical formulae, and approximately equals 6.28. Some have argued that 𝜏 is the clearer and more fundamental constant and that Tau Day should be celebrated alongside or instead of Pi Day. Celebrants of this date jokingly suggest eating "twice the pie".

Some also celebrate π on November 10, since it is the 314th day of the year (in leap years, on November 9).

== Gallery ==
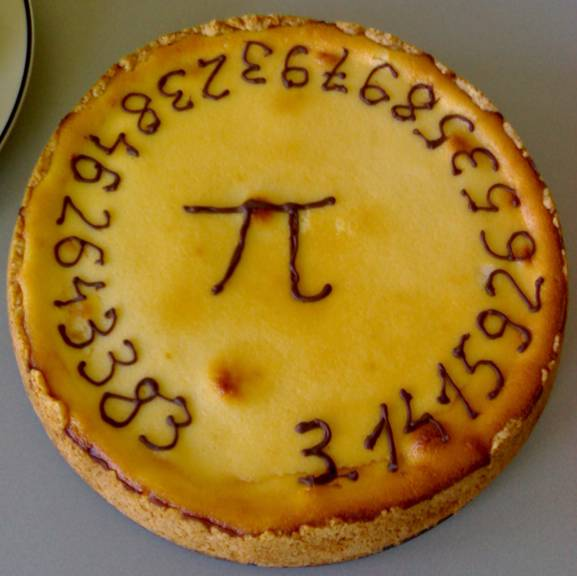
Pi Pie at Delft University

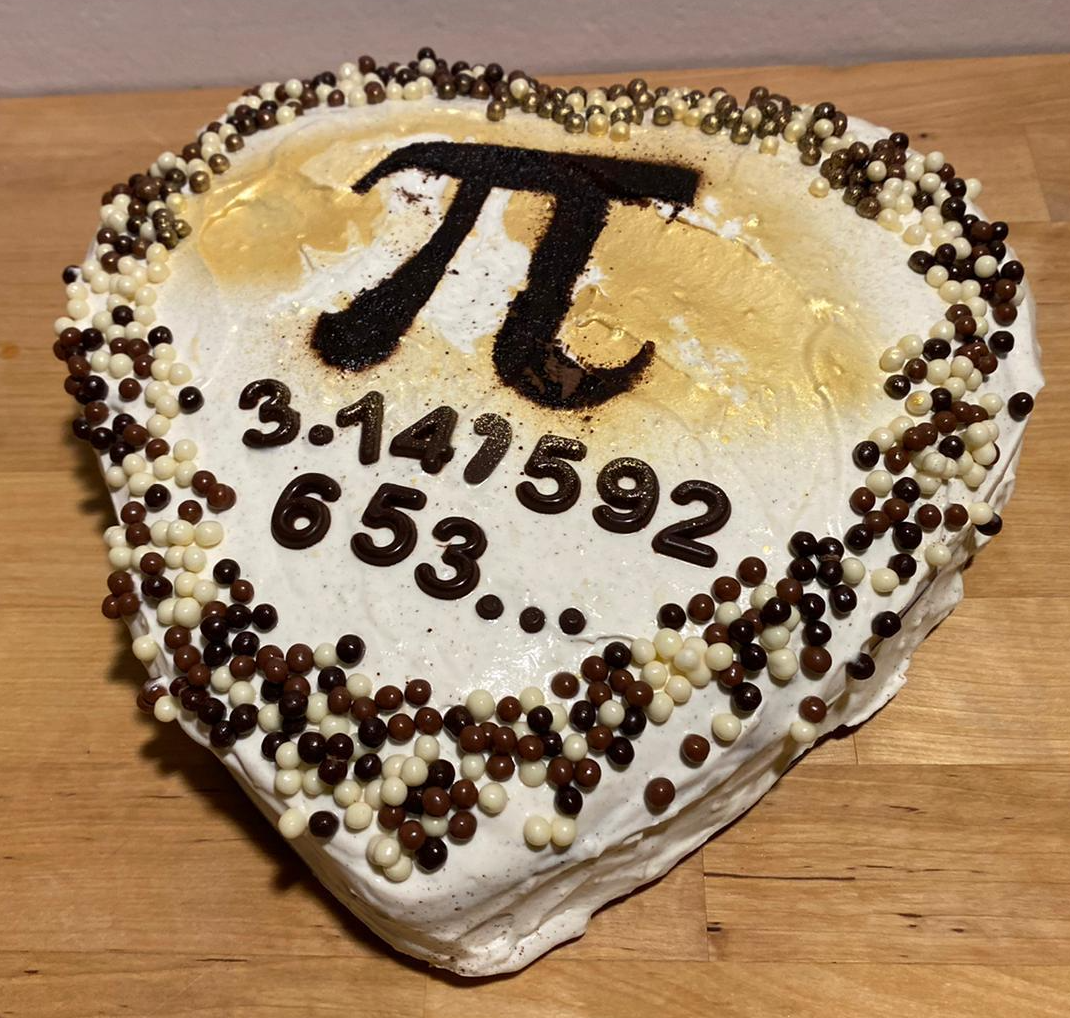
Creme pie in celebration of Pi day showing the Greek letter and the first digits of Pi.

A pie for Pi Day and Peeing Day

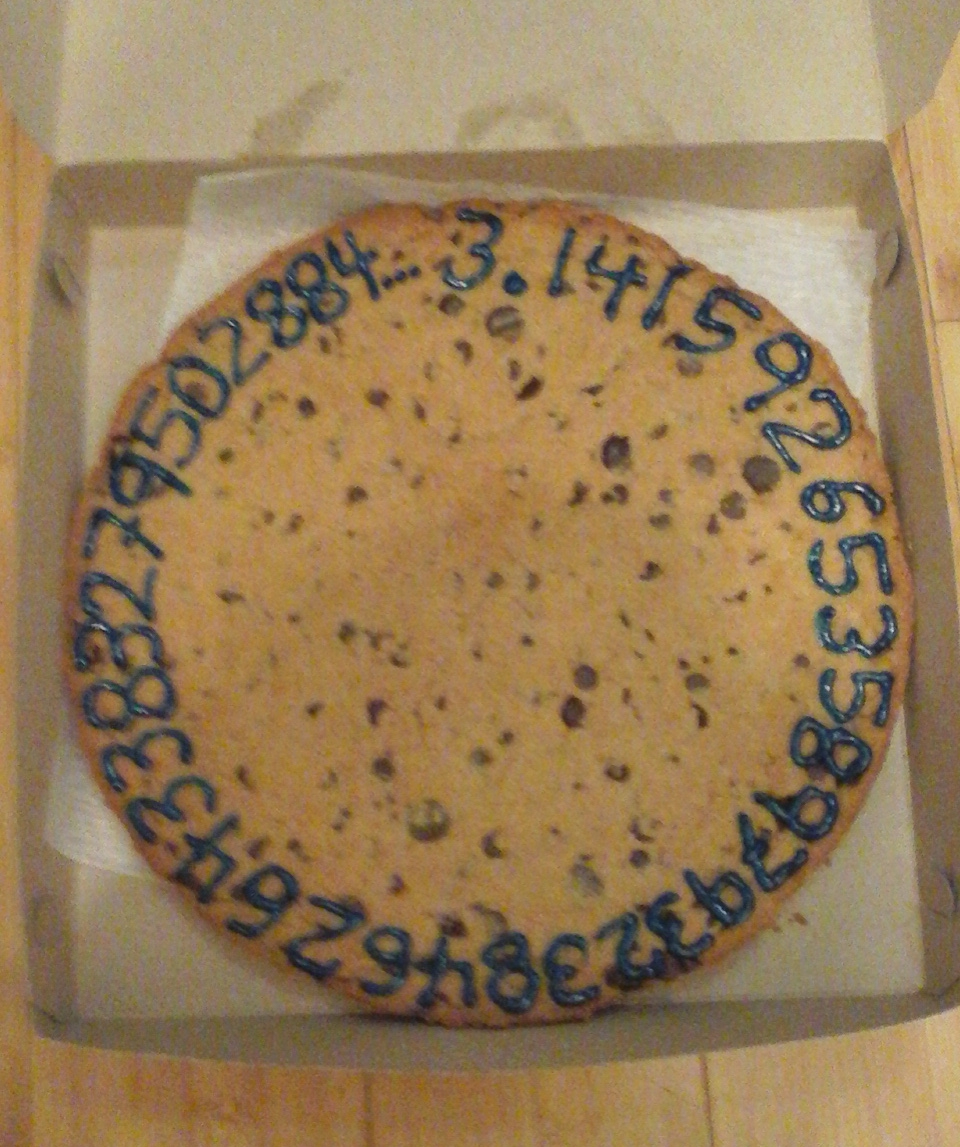
A cookie cake "pie"

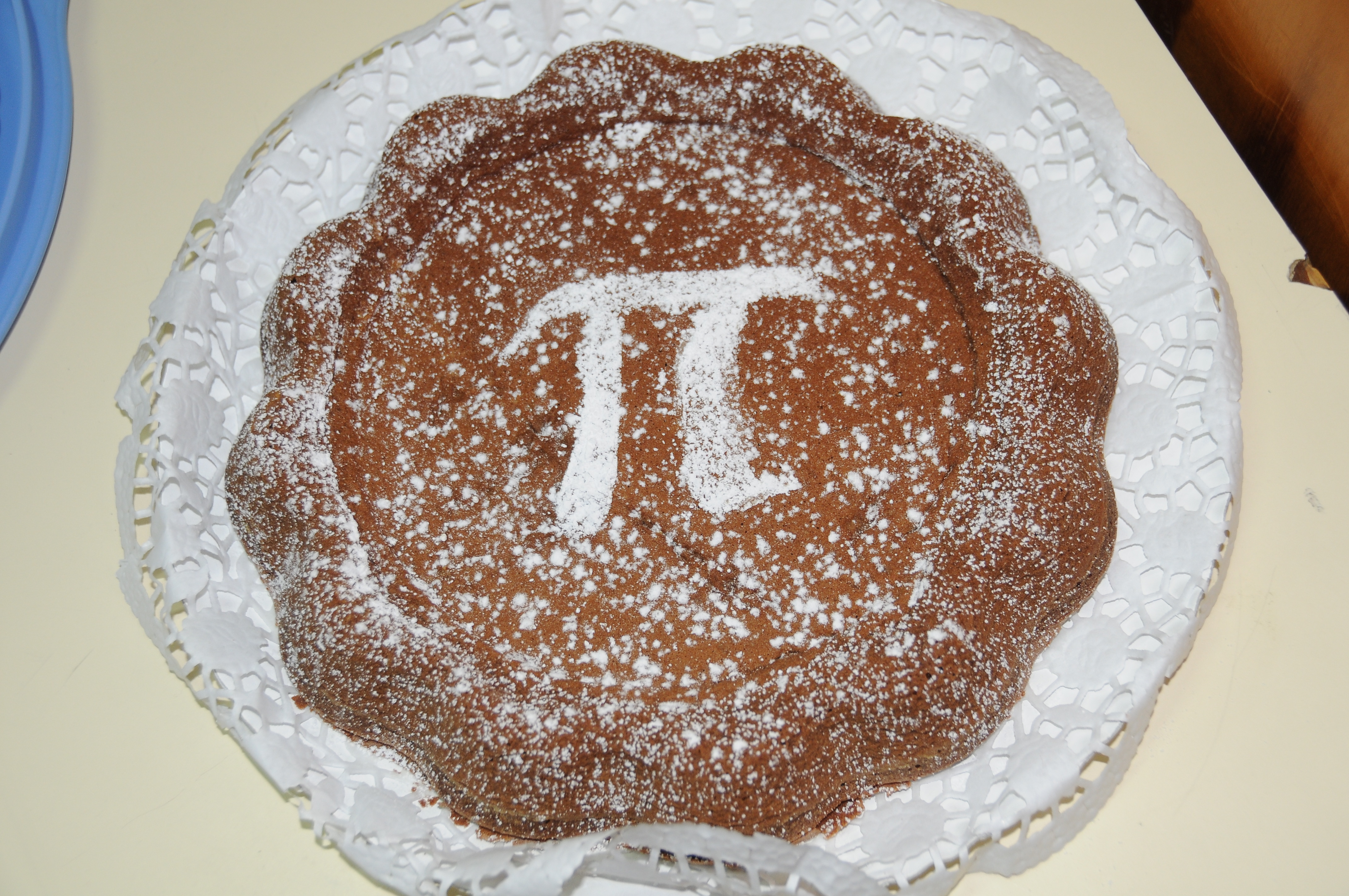
Pi Day cake in Escola de Palmeira, Braga, Portugal

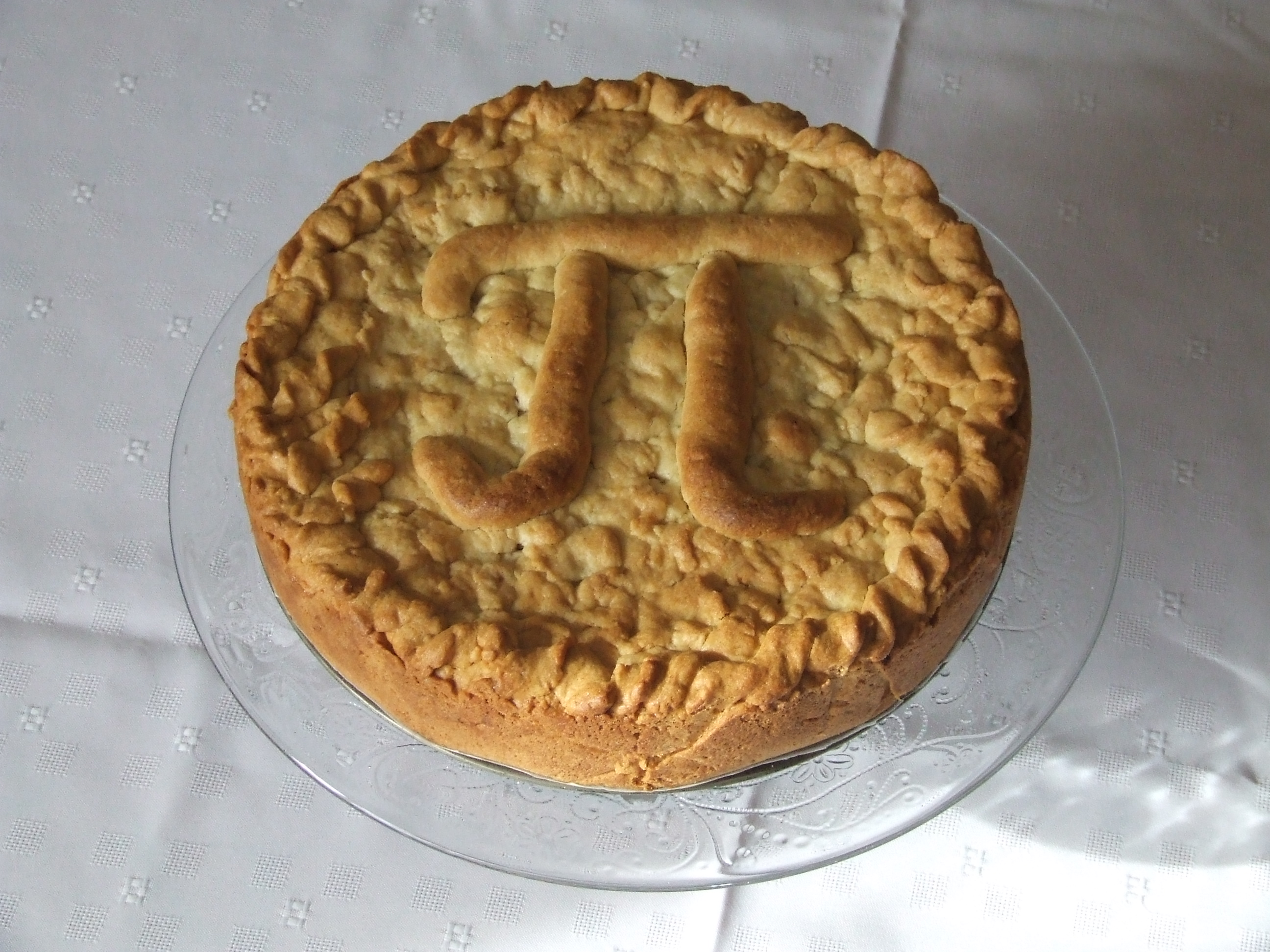
Apple pie baked on March 14th 2011 for Pi Day in Lublin, Poland

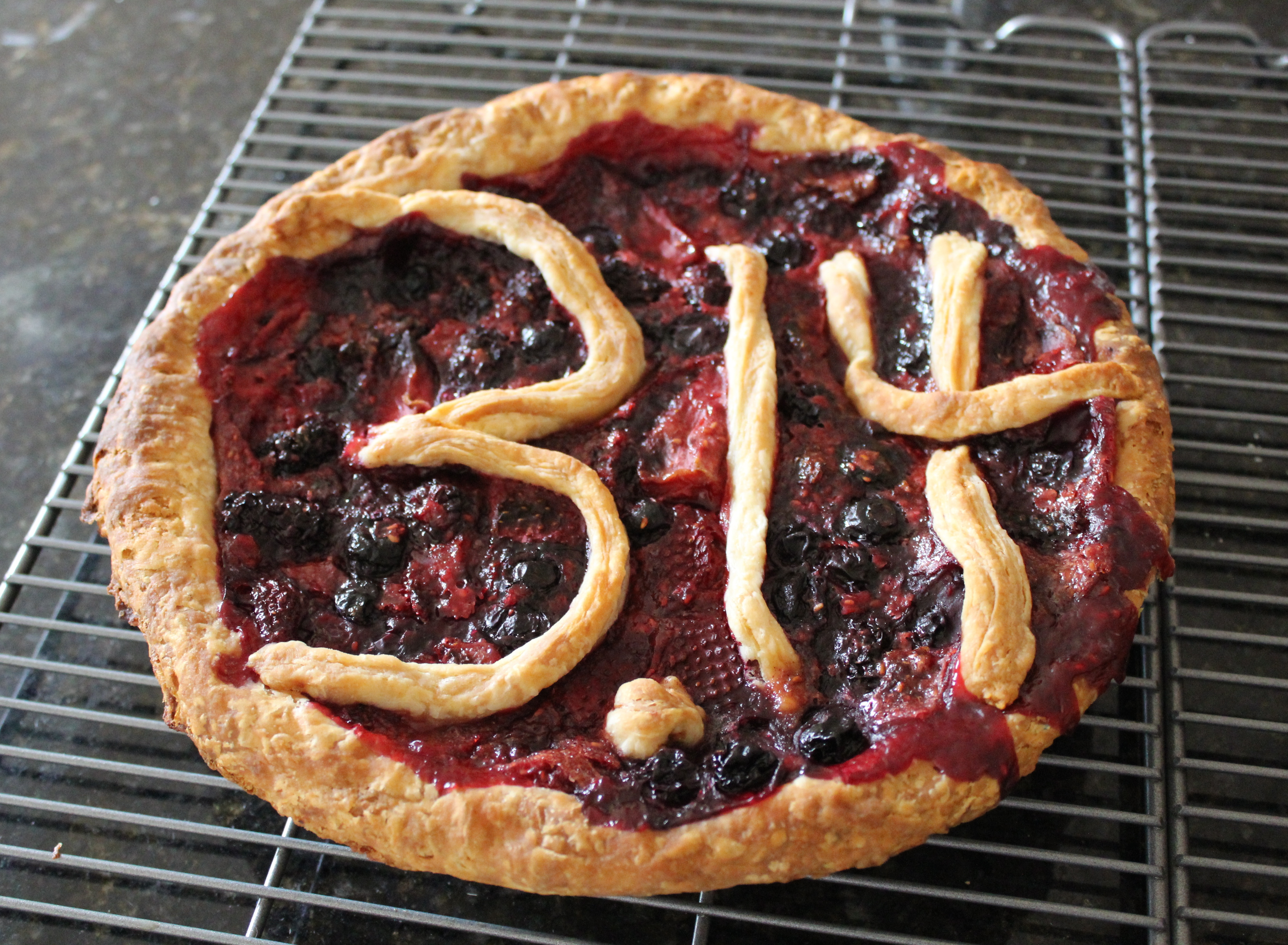
A bear pie

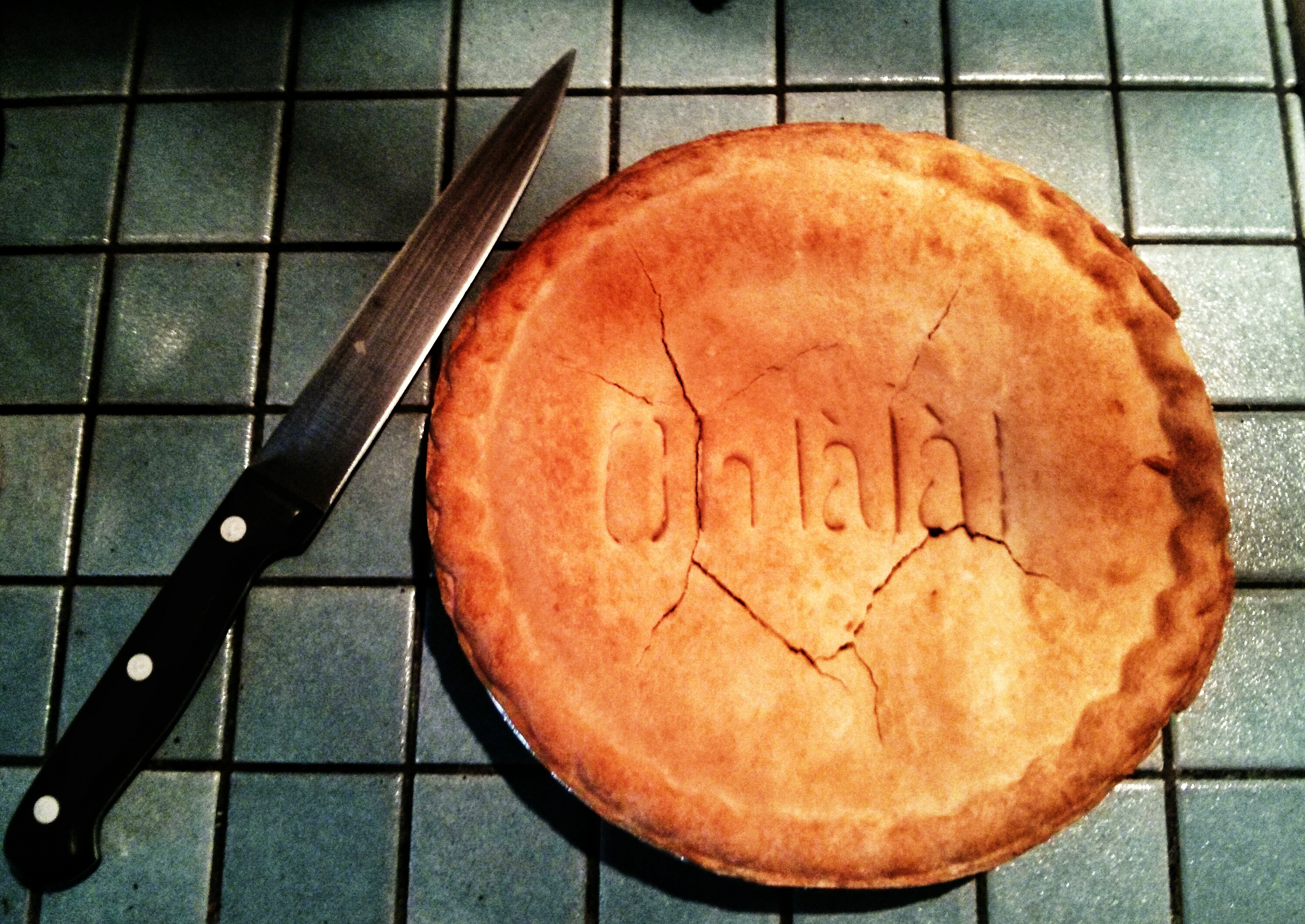

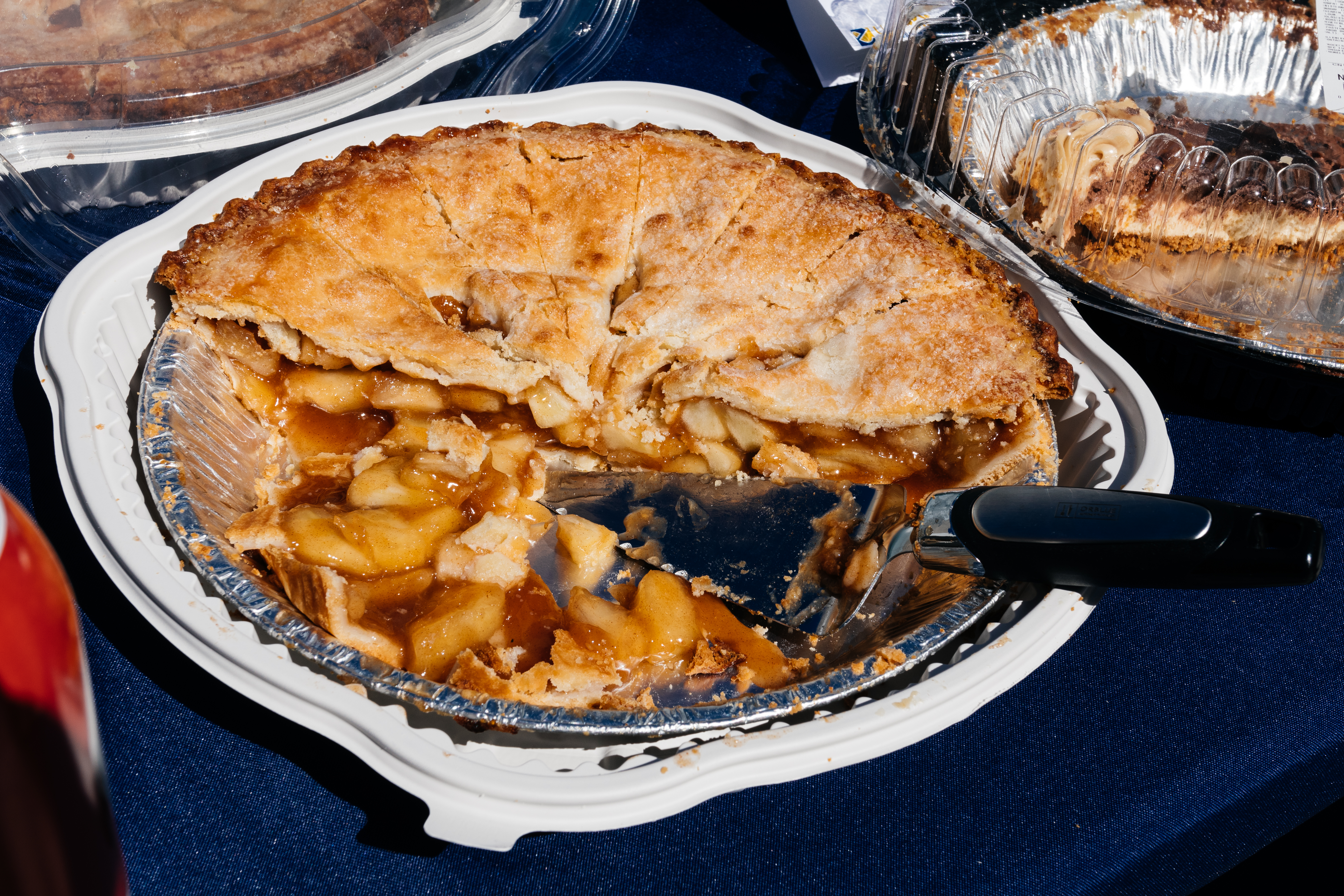
Pi Day social at UC Davis College of Engineering

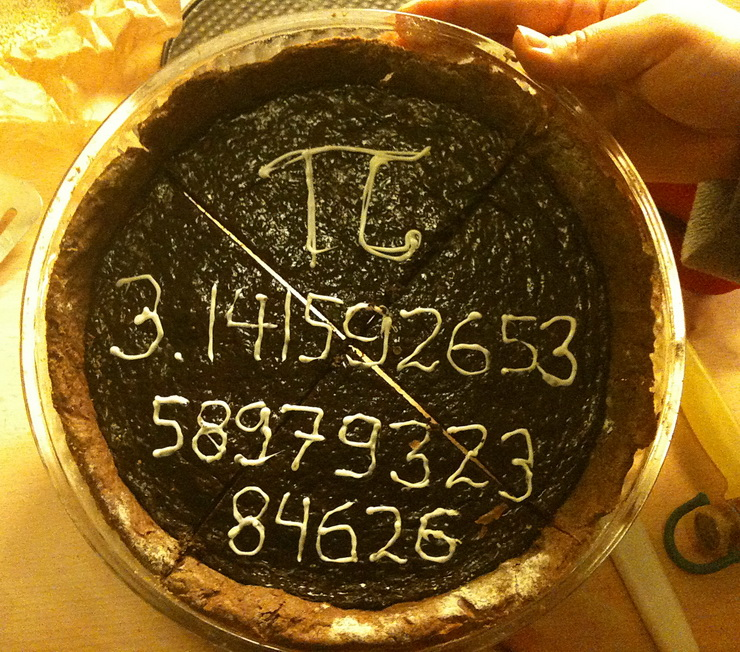

== See also ==
- Mole Day – Unofficial holiday related to chemistry
- Square Root Day
- Programmer's Day
