= System Administrator Appreciation Day =

Annual observance for IT workers

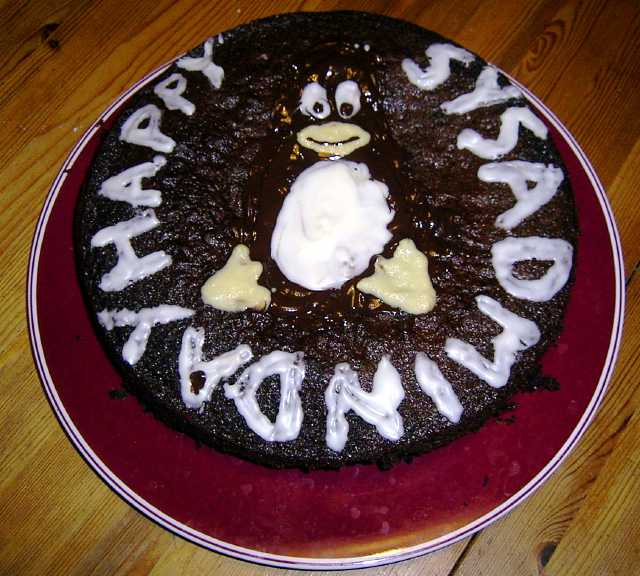
- A cake celebrating System Administrator Appreciation Day with Tux the Linux penguin on the top
- Observed by: Worldwide
- Date: Last Friday in July
- 2025 date: July 25
- 2026 date: July 31
- 2027 date: July 30
- 2028 date: July 28
- Related to: Day of the Programmer

System Administrator Appreciation Day, also known as Sysadmin Day, SysAdminDay is an annual event created by system administrator Ted Kekatos. The event exists to show appreciation for the work of sysadmins and other IT workers. It is an annual holiday, celebrated on the last Friday of July.

== History ==
The first System Administrator Appreciation Day was celebrated on July 28, 2000. Kekatos was inspired to create the special day by a Hewlett-Packard magazine advertisement in which a system administrator is presented with flowers and fruit-baskets by grateful co-workers as thanks for installing new printers. Kekatos had just installed several of the same model printer at his workplace.

The official SysAdmin Day website includes many suggestions for the proper observation of the holiday. Most common is cake and ice cream. There are many international websites which celebrate the holiday.

Many geek and Internet culture businesses, such as O'Reilly Media, also honor the holiday with special product offerings and contests. Various filk songs have been written to commemorate the day. The songs have reached a level of popularity where they are also covered by other performers.

There are many companies selling printed greeting cards for the holiday. Attempts to have Hallmark Cards recognize the holiday as a Hallmark Holiday have yet to be realized. Many e-card websites already have special SysAdminDay cards available.

The holiday has been recognized and promoted by many IT professional organizations, the League of Professional System Administrators, SAGE/USENIX and SNIPhub.

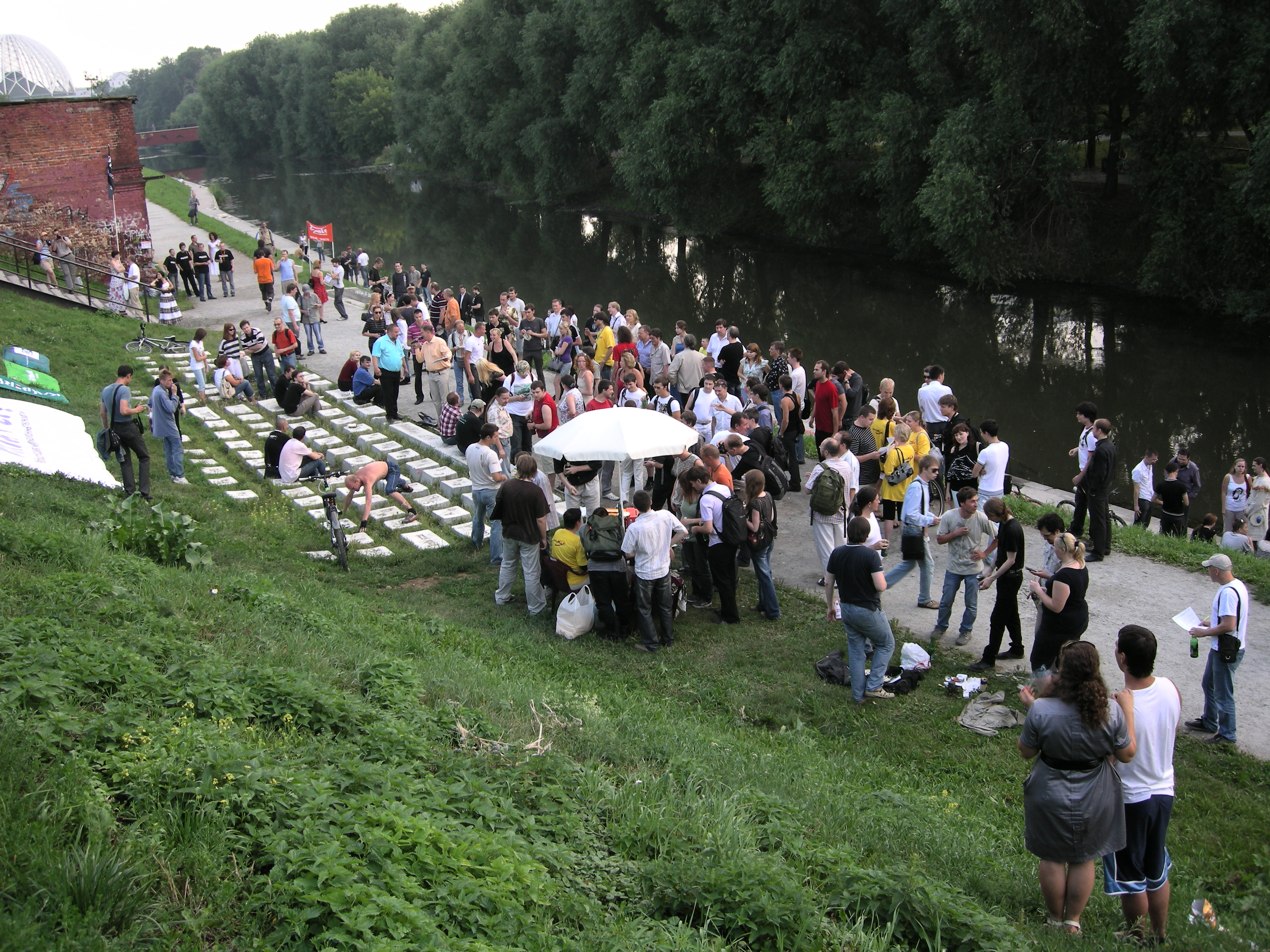
Ekaterinburg Sysadmin Day near Keyboard Monument in 2011

== "Sysadmin Day" around the world ==
=== Russia ===
Since 2006, the All-Russia System Administrator Gathering is held annually near Kaluga city. In present times thousands of people come there from more than 150 cities of Russia, Ukraine, Belarus and Kazakhstan. There is also a separate event near Kaluga called LinuxFest which is held on the last Friday in July. There is also a similar regular event in Novosibirsk on the bank of Novosibirsk Reservoir.

Ekaterinburg technicians also celebrate the last July Friday. Before 2010 there were spontaneous gatherings, and since 2010 the event received official permission from Ekaterinburg authorities to be annually held near famous Keyboard monument in the city centre with support from IT companies. There are "sysadmin competitions" between participants: they throw defunct PC mice to reach maximum distance and also throw such mice (with their "tails" cut out) into a distant empty computer case used as basket. Additionally, they powerlift a bundle of unused HDDs. In 2016 during such an event a memorial plaque was set up at the monument to honor Eugene Zorin, the Ekaterinburg FidoNet organizer and Internet pioneer who died recently.

== See also ==
- World Information Society Day
- Programmers' Day
