= Development informatics =

Development informatics is a field of both research and practice focusing on the application of information systems in socio-economic development.

The "informatics" terminology is intended to be a translation of the French "informatique". It indicates a broad and systemic view that encompasses four inter-linked levels:

- Data, information and knowledge
- Information and communication technologies
- Processes of learning, decision-making and communication
- Wider human, organisational and national context

The terminology is therefore intended to indicate a broader approach than that taken by the more techno-centric definitions of either Information and Communication Technologies for Development (ICT4D), which focuses on use of ICTs for delivery of specific development goals, or Information and Communication Technologies and Development (ICTD), which looks at use of ICTs in developing countries.

However, it is unclear whether these differences are understood or used in practice.

The main network for those active in development informatics is the International Development Informatics Association, which organises conferences and publications in the field.

== See also ==
- World Development Information Day
