= World Television Day =

International observance, 21 November

- Observed by: United Nations
- Date: 21 November
- Next time: 21 November 2026
- Frequency: Annual

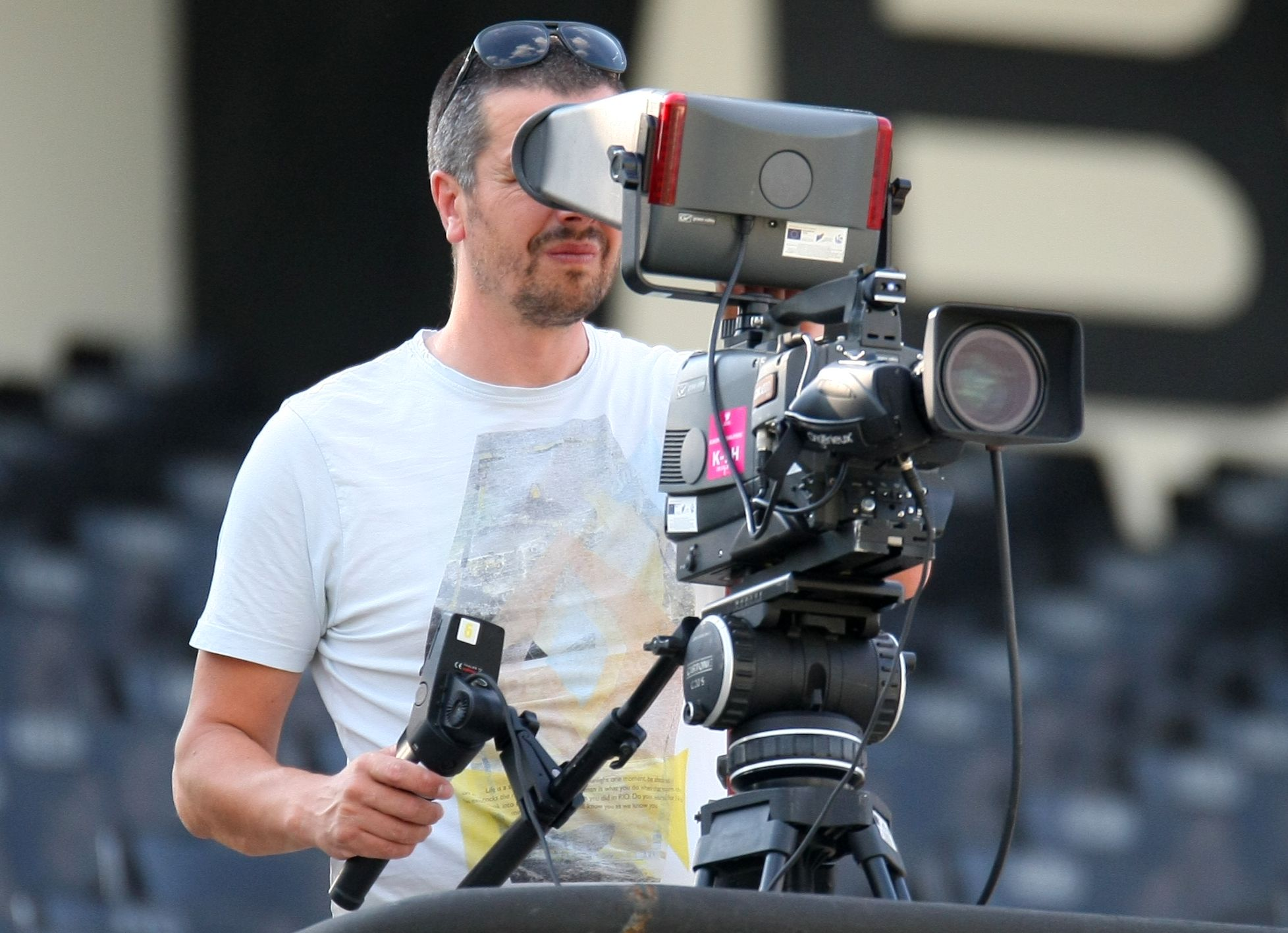

In December 1996 the United Nations proclaimed 21 November as World Television Day commemorating the date on which the first World Television Forum was held in 1996. This day was observed annually to recognize the increasing impact of television on decision making by bringing global attention to conflicts, threats to peace and security, and its potential role in focusing on other major issues, including economic and social matters.

Opposition to this declaration took the form of 11 abstentions to a vote on the resolution; in expressing their opposition, the delegation from Germany said:

There are already three United Nations days encompassing similar subjects: World Press Freedom Day; World Telecommunication and Information Society Day; and World Development Information Day. To add another day does not make much sense... [T]elevision is only one means of information and an information medium to which a considerable majority of the world population has no access... That vast majority could easily look at World Television Day as a rich man's day. They do not have access to television. There are more important information media and here I would mention radio in particular. We think it is more important to enhance the role of those media than that of television.
