= International Day of Diplomats =

International days

- Official name: International Day of Diplomats
- Observed by: Worldwide
- Significance: To remember the diplomats of every country who play a vital role in maintaining world peace.
- Begins: 24 October 2017
- Date: 24 October
- Next time: 24 October 2027
- Duration: One day
- Frequency: Annual

International Day of Diplomats is celebrated on 24 October every year. The first International Day of Diplomats was celebrated in Brasília on 24 October 2017 by Indian diplomat Abhay K. with the participation of diplomats from Bangladesh, France, Ghana, India, Israel, Italy, Mexico, South Africa, and Turkey. Also Diplomats from Brazil, France, and European Union celebrated the 24th October in Lomé in 2017. Other diplomats from Austria, India, Brazil, Egypt, Netherlands and Zimbabwe among others took part in the celebrations of the second International Day of Diplomats. Ambassadors of the United States, European Union, African Union, India, South Korea, Algeria, Turkey, the Charge de Affaires of Russia, Egypt and diplomats of the Vatican, Switzerland among other countries celebrated the third International day of Diplomats in Antananarivo, Madagascar. Fourth International Diplomats Day was celebrated globally. 5th International Diplomats Day was celebrated across the world on 24th Oct 2021

== History ==
Diplomats of some countries have their own days to celebrate their National Day of Diplomats, while many countries do not have a day of diplomats. Russian diplomats celebrate February 10 as Russian Diplomats Day while Indian diplomats celebrate October 9 as the Indian Foreign Service Day. Brazil celebrates April 20 as Brazil's Diplomats Day.

The idea of celebrating an International Day of Diplomats was proposed by Indian diplomat Abhay K. to remember the diplomats of every country who play a vital role in maintaining world peace. He also organized the first International Day of Diplomats in Brasilia on 24 October 2017.

2nd International Day of Diplomats was celebrated in Brasilia and other capitals with the participation of diplomats from several countries on 24 October 2018.

3rd International Day of Diplomats was celebrated by the Ambassadors of the United States, European Union, African Union, India, South Korea, Algeria, Turkey, the Charge de Affaires of Russia, Egypt and diplomats of the Vatican, Switzerland among other countries in Antananarivo, Madagascar.

4th International Diplomats Day was celebrated by diplomats across the world by posting messages on social media with #InternationalDiplomatsDay and #ServingPeopleGlobally. Events were held in Dubai and Madagascar and celebrities and general public too joined in the celebrations across the world.

5th International Day of Diplomats was celebrated in several countries. Foreign minister of Madagascar, Patrick Rajoelina, Union minister Hardeep Singh Puri, MPs Shashi Tharoor and Achyuta Samanta, former foreign secretary and national security adviser Shivshankar Menon, ambassadors Navdeep Suri, Kishan Rana, Gurjit Singh, Mohan Kumar, Houda Nonoo of Bahrain, High Commissioner Shumona Iqbal of Bangladesh, UN resident coordinator Issa Sanogo, ambassador David Ashley of the UK, special representative Madame Hawa of African Union, ambassadors Sanjay Panda, Namrata Kumar, Prasant Pise and several other diplomats from Israel, Ireland, the USA and celebrities Medha Koirala from Nepal and Raine Chawla actively took part in the celebrations.

6th International Day of Diplomats was celebrated by the Consulate General of India in Dubai, led by Consul General Dr. Aman Puri. CGI Dubai shared on X on Oct 25, 2022 "Consulate General of India celebrated 6th International Day of Diplomats and Diwali in the gracious presence of members of the Diplomatic Community in Dubai and senior representatives from Dubai Local Authority yesterday." I wished a very Happy International Day to diplomats and their families across the world through a recorded video message on this occasion adding.. A country which has skillful diplomats does not have to go to war. Diplomats play a crucial role in keeping a world going and that's why it is important to remember the sacrifice made by them and their families.

7th International Day of Diplomats celebrated across the world. Souef Mohamed Al-Amine, former foreign Minister of Comoros shared “Diplomats play an essential role in facilitating negotiations, promoting international cooperation, and resolving conflicts peacefully. It is also the opportunity to salute the work of all the world’s diplomats, who work to promote peace, security and global development.”

8th International Day of Diplomats was celebrated at the Diplomatic Business Club in Islamabad with diplomats from around the world gathering to honor their dedication to fostering global unity and cooperation with the theme ‘Diplomats – Defuse Crises and Shape Peace.’ The event highlighted the vital role of diplomacy in maintaining international stability.

9th International Day of Diplomats was marked internationally and by Kazan Forum, which posted on 24th October 2025-"October 24 marks International Diplomats Day and United Nations Day, which turns 80 this year. The idea of Diplomats Day was proposed by Indian Ambassador Abhay Kumar to honor those who play a vital role in maintaining peace in the world. He organized the first celebration on October 24, 2017, in Brasilia. International Diplomats Day reminds us of the importance of the art of negotiation and peaceful dialogue. Diplomats possess extensive knowledge, composure, and a high level of communication skills. At various times, they have prevented conflicts and formed alliances. In the modern world, diplomacy is the main instrument of foreign policy, uniting countries and building trust-based relationships between them.”

10th International Day of Diplomats was celebrated on 24th October 2026 by Ambassador Dewi Gustina Tobing of Indonesia in Colombo in her capacity as the Dean of Diplomatic corps in Sri Lanka, with the participation of the Sri Lankan Foreign Minister Vijitha Herath and diplomats and their families from several countries stationed in Sri Lanka. Canada's Global Affairs also recognised its diplomats for their vital work on this day. Several Embassies of Iran shared posts on social media marking the occasion. US diplomatic organizations and think tanks also marked the day.

== National Day of Diplomats ==
- Moldova: 17 January – Moldovan Diplomat's Day
- Russia: 10 February – Russian Diplomat's Day
- Brazil: 20 April – Brazil's Diplomat's Day
- Azerbaijan: 9 July – Day of Azerbaijan's Diplomatic Service
- Bulgaria: 19 July – Day of the Bulgarian Diplomatic Service
- Argentina: 29 September – Argentina’s Diplomat’s Day
- India: 9 October – Indian Foreign Service Day
- Kyrgyzstan: 24 October – Kyrgyz Diplomat's Day
- Georgia: 3 November – Georgian Diplomat's Day
- Colombia: 14 November – Colombian Diplomat's Day
