= Abhay Kumar =

Indian author and diplomat

Abhay K.
- Poet-diplomat Abhay K.
- Born: Abhay Kumar; Rajgir, Bihar, India
- Education: Kirori Mal College Jawaharlal Nehru University
- Occupation: Diplomat
- Website: www.abhayk.com

Abhay Kumar (known mononymously as Abhay K.) is an Indian career diplomat and the author of several books including Nalanda: How it Changed the World. He currently serves as India's Ambassador of Azerbaijan. He joined the Indian Foreign Service in 2003 after doing master's in geography at Jawaharlal Nehru University and Kirorimal College, Delhi University. He served as India's 21st ambassador to Madagascar and Comoros from 2019 to 2022 and as India's Deputy Ambassador to Brazil from 2016 to 2019, where he founded International Day of Diplomats, and as Spokesperson and First Secretary at the Indian Embassy in Kathmandu, Nepal from 2012 to 2016. He served as Acting Consul General of India in Saint Petersburg, and Third/Second Secretary at Indian Embassy, Moscow, Russia from 2005 to 2010. He served as Under Secretary for Public Diplomacy at the Ministry of External Affairs from 2010 to 2012.

Ambassador Abhay Kumar and President Ilham Aliyev in 2026 in Baku

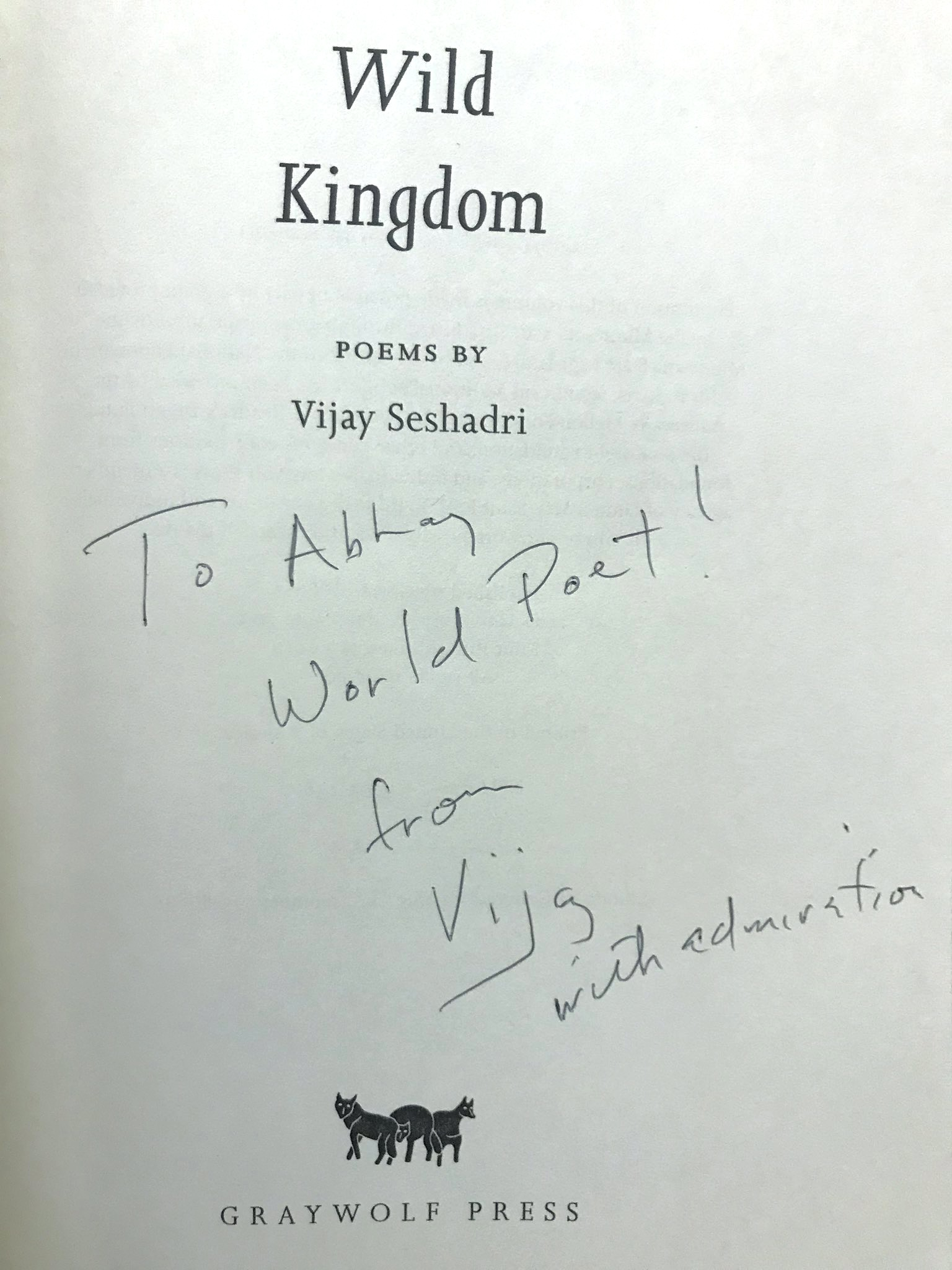
Abhay K. called a World Poet by poet Vijay Seshadri

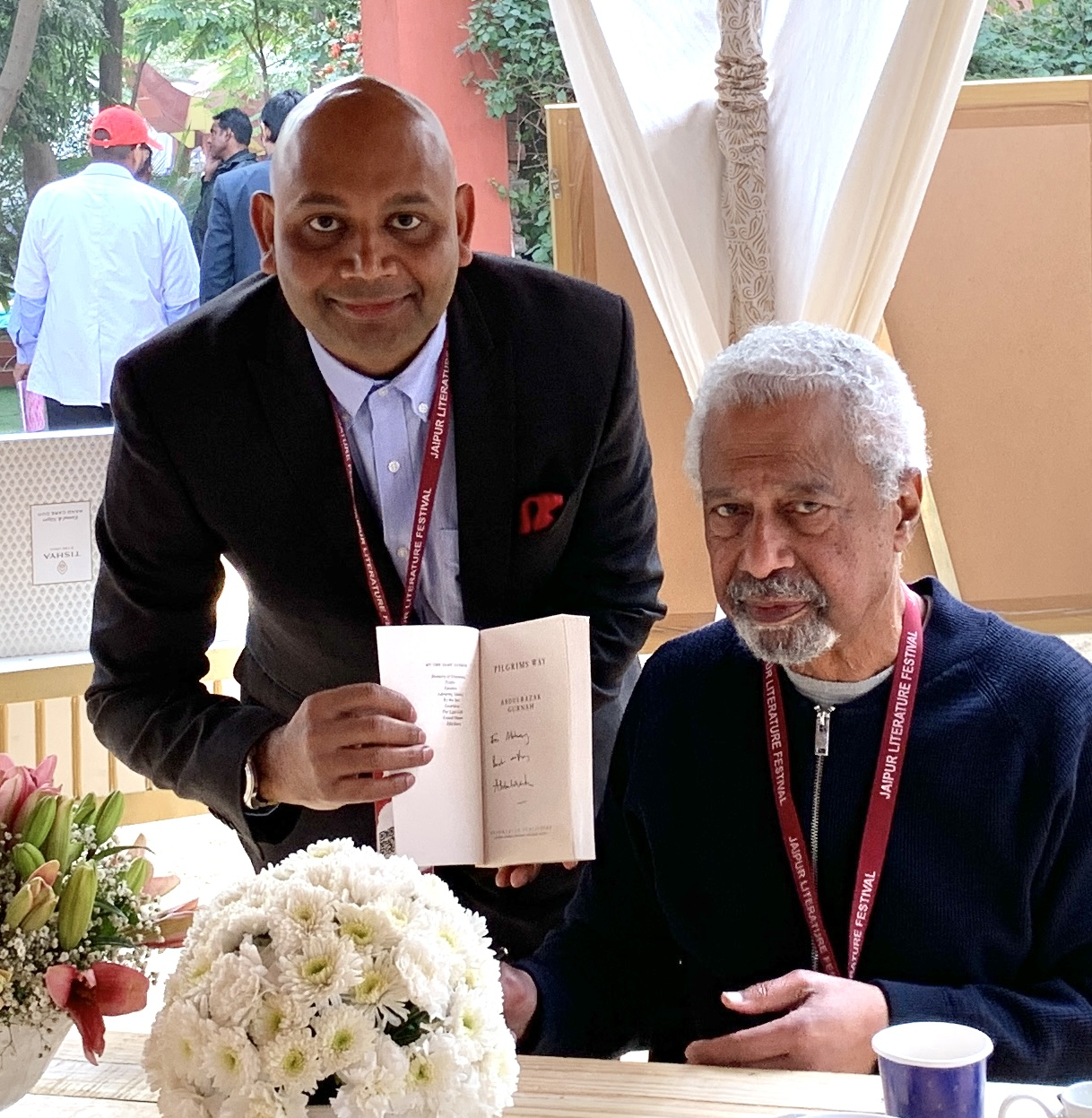
Abhay K. and Nobel Laureate Abdulrazak Gurnah

Poet Abhay K. presenting his poetry collection 'The Alphabets of Africa' to Literature Nobel Laureate Abdulrazak Gurnah in Kozhikode, Kerala on 24th January 2026

He received Sarojini Naidu Award for Poetry 2026 for his lyrical and singable translation of Sri Hanuman Chalisa at Banaras Literature Festival and Bharat Shikhsa Samman 2025 and the SAARC Literary Award for his contribution to contemporary South Asian poetry. He received Asia-Pacific Excellence Award in 2014 and was nominated for the Pushcart Prize 2013. His poetry book The Seduction of Delhi was shortlisted for Muse India-Satish Verma Young Writer Award 2015. He has been called a 'World Poet' by Pulitzer Prize winning poet Vijay Seshadri His translation of Kalidasa's Meghaduta and Ritusamhara received Kalinga Literary Festival 2020-2021 Poetry Book of the Year Award. while The Book of Bihari Literature edited by him received KLF Book Award 2022. He recorded his poems at the Library of Congress. His poem 'The Partitioned Land' was taught at the Cornell University in the Fall 2021. His book-length poem 'Monsoon' has been chosen by Harvard University's assistant professor Sarah Dimick to study for a book project on Climate and Literature along with the two books of Amitava Ghosh. He was elected as a foreign corresponding member of Brazilian Academy of Letters in 2023.

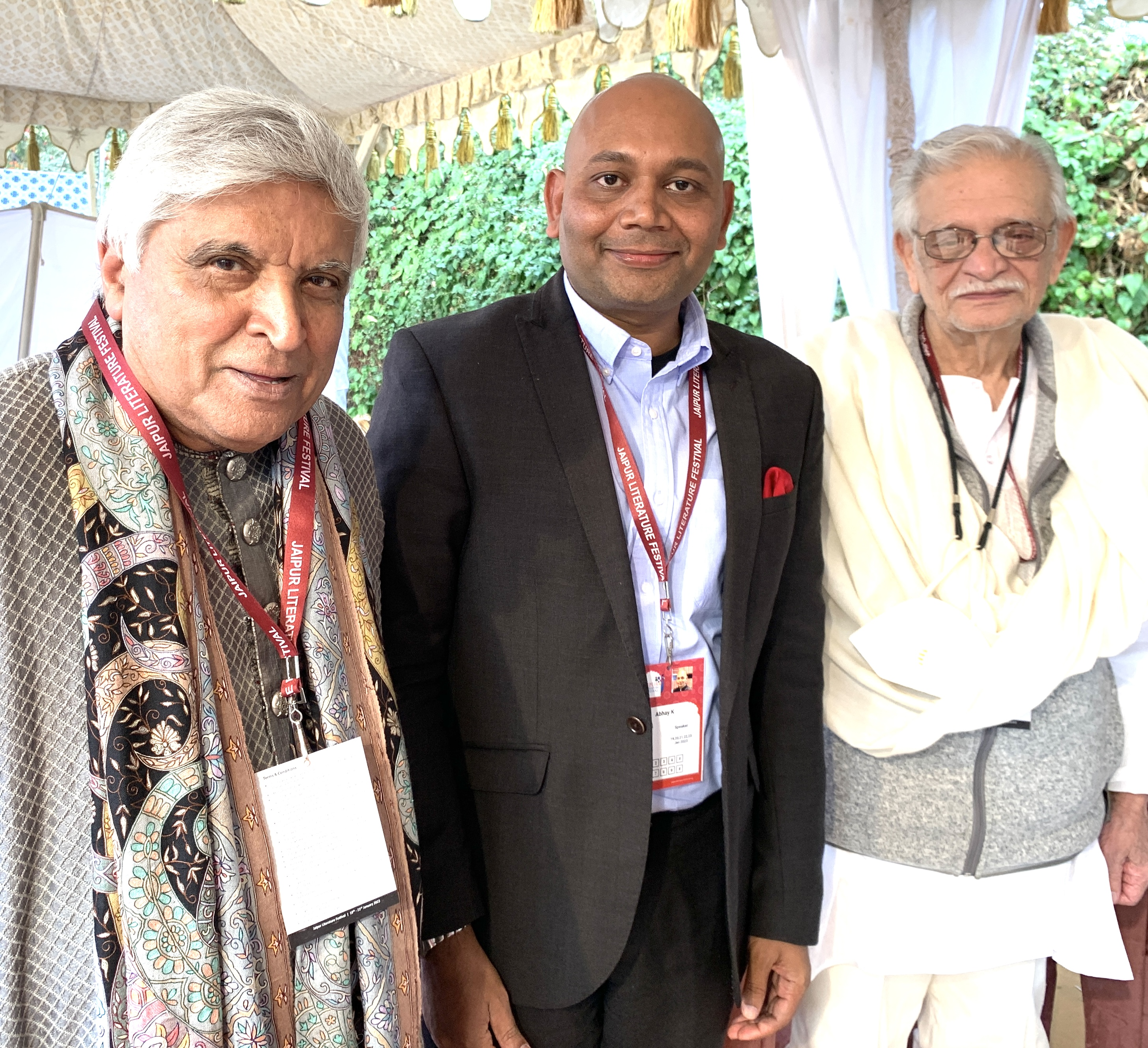
Abhay K, Gulzar and Javed Akhtar

== Early life and education ==
Abhay was born and raised near Rajgir in Nalanda district of Bihar. He studied at Delhi University and Jawaharlal Nehru University. He joined the Indian Foreign Service in 2003. He studied Russian language and literature at the Moscow State University, U.S. foreign policy at George Washington University, diplomacy at Fletcher School at Tufts University, Boston and has a Certificate in Poetry Writing from the International Writing Program, University of Iowa. A long time Yoga practitioner, he is a certified Yoga teacher from the Yoga Certification Board, Ministry of AYUSH of India.

== Career ==
=== Diplomatic career ===
He is an Indian Foreign Service officer and has served in various positions at the Ministry of External Affairs (MEA) of the government of India and at the Indian missions and posts abroad in Moscow, Saint Petersburg, Kathmandu, Brasília and Antananarivo. At the MEA headquarters in New Delhi he served as the Under Secretary Digital diplomacy and sent the first tweet after setting up an official Twitter account of the Ministry of External Affairs of India in 2010. He served as the spokesperson of the Embassy of India, Kathmandu from 2012 to 2015. He was appointed Director of the Nehru Centre, London in March 2015 however he could not take up the assignment. Subsequently, he was appointed as India's Deputy High Commissioner to Australia in August 2015 however could not take up the assignment. He served as India's Deputy Chief of Mission to Brazil from 2016 to 2019 and as India's 21st Ambassador to the Indian Ocean islands of Madagascar and Comoros from 2019 to 2022. He served as the Deputy Director General of Indian Council of Cultural Relations responsible for cultural events during India's presidency of G-20 from December 2022-November 2023 and later in charge of organising conferences, distinguished visitors programme, awards, Prateebha Sangam, Annapurna Certificates for authentic Indian cuisine and ICCR's Hindi quarterly Gagananchal until 2025. He started Indian Foreign Service Day celebrations on 9 October 2011. He also proposed celebration of the International Day of Diplomats on the United Nations Day which was celebrated in Brasília for the first time on 24 October 2017 with the participation of diplomats from several countries. The second International Day was celebrated in Brasília while the third one was celebrated in Madagascar. The fourth International Day of Diplomats was celebrated globally. The Embassy of India, Antananarivo became the first Indian Embassy to go solar on 2 October 2020 during his tenure as Ambassador of India to Madagascar and to have a Street Library. He curates the list of books written by Indian diplomats and on the basis of his list, Heritage of Diplomacy corners have been created at the libraries of Indian Council of World Affairs, Sushma Swaraj Foreign Service Institute, Central Library of Ministry of External Affairs, and the libraries of Nalanda University, and Manipal Academy of Higher Education.

== Literary career ==
Abhay's first book titled River Valley to Silicon Valley(2007) was a memoir that also contained his first poem, 'Soul Song'. Robert Fay in his piece 'In Search of the Writer-Diplomat tradition' writes- "India continues to maintain this venerable tradition, with poet Abhay Kumar serving in recent years as the Indian Ambassador to Madagascar and Comoros." His book of history Nalanda: How it Changed the World published by Penguin Random House became a national bestseller.

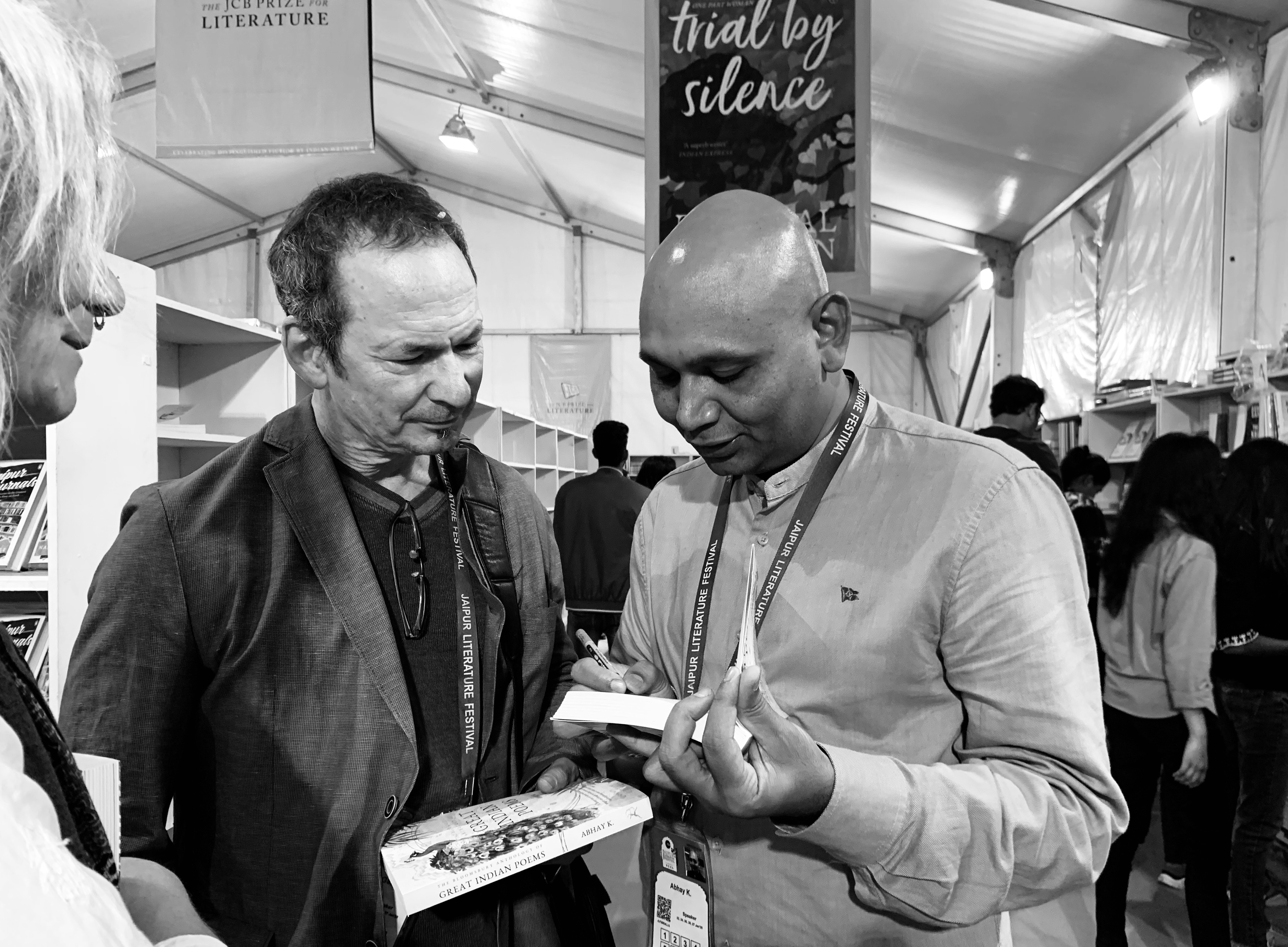
Abhay K. and Forrest Gander at the Jaipur Literature Festival 2020

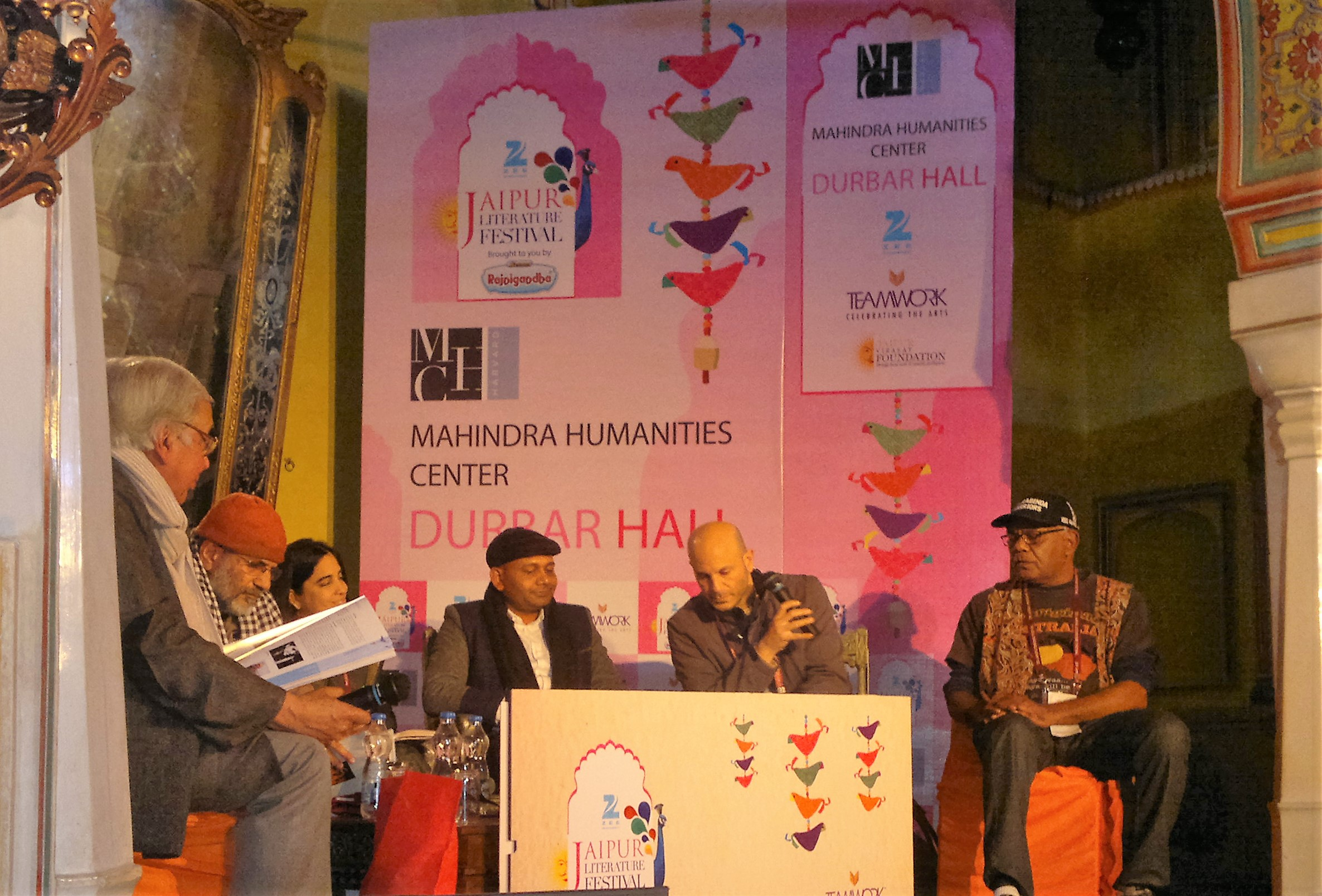
Abhay K, Fady Joudah, Lionel Fogarty, Sadaf Saz, Arjun Deo Charan, Ashok Bajpai at JLF 2015

He has published thirteen collections of poetry.

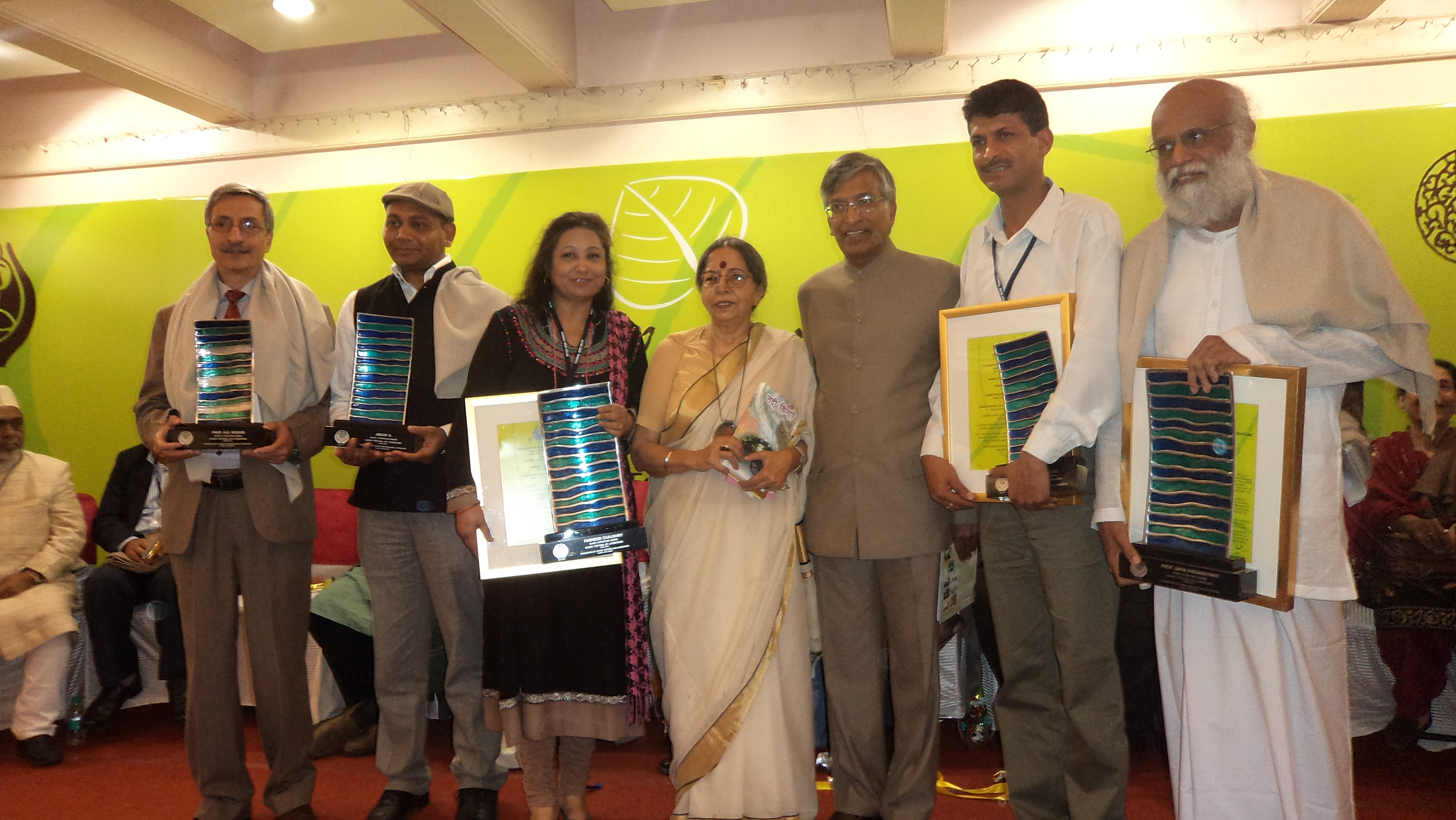
Recipients of SAARC Literary Award 2013

Abhay's poems have appeared in several magazines and literary journals including Poetry Salzburg Review, The Asia Literary Review, Gargoyle, and The Caravan. His poems have also been included in a number of anthologies.

In 2017, CAPITALS, an anthology of poems on the capital cities of the world edited by Abhay K., was released. It brought poets together from across the planet and included contributions from Derek Walcott, Vijay Seshadri, George Szirtes, and Ruth Padel among other prominent poets from 185 countries.

100 Great Indian Poems (2018) is an anthology of Indian poetry edited covering over 3000 years of Indian poetry and 28 Indian languages. It has been translated and published into Portuguese, Spanish, Italian, Malagasy and Arabic.It has also been translated into French, Russian and Nepali, which will be published soon.

He has also edited The Bloomsbury Book of Great Indian Love Poems sweeping through three millennia and over two dozen Indian languages.

He has translated poems of 60 Brazilian poets from Portuguese and Kālidāsa's Meghadūta and Ritusamhara from Sanskrit. His translation of the first Magahi novel Fool Bahadurby Jayanath Pati has been published by Penguin Random House.

In 2013 Abhay released Earth Anthem, a song intended as an anthem for the planet Earth, written by him and translated into eight languages including six official UN languages – Arabic, Chinese, French, English, Russian and Spanish – as well as Hindi and Nepali. It was set to music by Sapan Ghimire and sung by Shreya Sotang from Nepal. It has been translated into over 160 languages. On World Environment Day 2017, Abhay K's Earth Anthem composed by L. Subramaniam and sung by Kavita Krishnamurthy was released in Brasília. A New video of Earth Anthem was released on 22 April 2020 to mark the 50th anniversary of the Earth Day. Over 100 eminent artists from across the world came together to read Earth Anthem to mark 51st anniversary of Earth Day on 22 April 2021. Abhay also wrote an anthem for the South Asian Association for Regional Cooperation (SAARC) in an attempt to foster South Asian consciousness and bring the member states of SAARC together. It has spurred discussions on the need for an official SAARC Anthem. He is the first Indian poet invited to record his poems at the Library of Congress. He wrote Moon Anthem to mark the landing of Chandrayaan 2 on the Moon, which has been composed by Dr. L. Subramaniam and sung by Kavita Krishnamurthy. He has penned anthems on all the planets in the Solar System.

== Artistic career ==
Abhay K. has exhibited his art works at the National Museum of India in New Delhi, Bihar Museum, Patna, Salar Jung Museum, Hyderabad, and in St. Petersburg, Paris, Brasilia and Antananarivo. His art works use geometric forms and focus on evolution of planetary consciousness.

- "The geometry of Malevich and the musical coloured vision of Matyushin gain typical Indian colour vibrancy and even somewhat folklore inflections in his abstract and semi-abstract works."— Andrey Khlobystn
- "In his art works Abhay K creates an allegory of planetary consciousness -Emblems of the unity of the peoples. He draws images of apritual unity. A futuristic reworking of figurative and suprematic motives."— Stanislav Savitsky

Poetry-paintings of Abhay K and Italian artist Tarshito exhibited at the National Academy of Art, New Delhi highlighted Delhi's glorious past.

== Awards and recognition ==
- 2012: 1st Prize by the Amity School of Business, Noida, India for the case study Digital Revolution and Business at the 8th Renvoi, an International Management Case Study Competition
- 2012: Nominated for the Pushcart Prize
- 2013: SAARC Literary Award - Foundation of SAARC Writers and Literature
- 2014: Asia-Pacific Excellence Award
- 2015 : Shortlisted for Muse India-Satish Verma Young Writer Award 2015.
- 2017: Called 'World Poet' by Pulitzer Prize winning poet Vijay Seshadri
- 2022: Kalinga Literature Festival Award for the Best Poetry Book of the Year 2021 for the translation of Kalidasa's Meghaduta and Ritusamhara from the Sanskrit
- 2022: Elected an Associate Foreign Corresponding Member of Malagasy Academy
- 2022: Included in the anthology, Converse: Contemporary English Poetry by Indians, edited by Sudeep Sen, and published by Pippa Rann Books, London.
- 2023: KLF Book Award 2022 for The Book of Bihari Literature
- 2023: Elected a Foreign Corresponding Member of the Brazilian Academy of Letters, Brasília
- 2025: Received Bharat Shiksha Samman 2025 for promoting Indian culture and education
- 2026: Sarojini Naidu Award for Poetry 2026 for a lyrical and singable translation of Sri Hanuman Chalisa

== Literary works ==
=== Poetry books ===
- Enigmatic Love : Love poems from Moscow (Bookwell|2009)
- Fallen Leaves of Autumn (ArtXpress|2010)
- Candling the Light(Yash|2011)
- Remains (HarAnand|2012)
- The Seduction of Delhi(Bloomsbury|2014)
- The Eight-eyed Lord of Kathmandu (Bloomsbury India |2018) & (The Onslaught Press, Oxford & Paris|2017)
- The Prophecy of Brasilia (Bilingual edition in English and Portuguese| GaNa, Brazil|2018)
- The Alphabets of Latin America: A Carnival of Poems (Bloomsbury India |2020)
- The Magic of Madagascar (Bilingual edition in French and English|L'Harmattan, Paris|2021)
- Monsoon (Sahitya Akademi, India, 2022)
- Stray Poems (Poetrywala, India, 2022)
- Celestial (Mapin, 2023)
- The Alphabets of Africa (Penguin Random House, India, 2026)

=== Translated works ===
Abhay K. has translated

- Uttering Her Name by Gabriel Rosenstock (Salmon Ireland) into Hindi|2015
- New Brazilian Poems (Ibis Libris, Rio de Janeiro, Brazil |2019)
- Meghaduta by Kalidasa into English (Bloomsbury|2021)
- Ritusamhara by Kalidasa into English (Bloomsbury|2021)
- Fool Bahadur by Jayanath Pati, the first Magahi novel (Penguin Random House|2024)
- Hanuman Chalisa by Tulsidas (Bloomsbury India| 2025)

=== Edited ===
- Anthology of Contemporary Indian English Poetry (Enchanting Verses Literary Review|2016)
- CAPITALS (Bloomsbury|2017)
- 100 Great Indian Poems (Bloomsbury|2017)
- 100 More Great Indian Poems (Bloomsbury India|2019)
- The Bloomsbury Anthology of Great Indian Poems (Bloomsbury India|2020)
- New Brazilian Poems (Ibis Libris|2019)
- The Bloomsbury Book of Great Indian Love Poems (Bloomsbury|2020)
- The Book of Bihari Literature (HarperCollins|2022)

=== Non-fiction ===
- Nalanda: How it Changed the World (Penguin Random House|2025)
- River Valley to Silicon Valley (Bookwell|2007), republished as Becoming A Civil Servant (Kalinjar|2015)

== Research work on poetry of Abhay K. ==
A PhD on "Cultural Construct of Self: A Critical Study of Abhay Kumar's Poetry" was awarded by Maharaja Ganga Singh University, Bikaner, Rajasthan, India to Amit Dhawan in 2017. Academician Sapna Dogra has written a research paper comparing 'A River'of A.K. Ramanujan and 'Yamuna' of Abhay K.

== See also ==
- Indian English Poetry
- List of Indian poets in English
- Indian Foreign Service
- Poet-diplomat
