= World Telecommunication and Information Society Day =

International Telecommunication Union logo

World Telecommunication and Information Society Day is an international day proclaimed in November 2006 by the International Telecommunication Union Plenipotentiary Conference in Antalya, Turkey, to be celebrated annually on 17 May.

== History ==
World Telecommunication Day

The day had previously been known as 'World Telecommunication Day' to commemorate the founding of the International Telecommunication Union on 17 May 1865. It was instituted by the Plenipotentiary Conference in Malaga-Torremolinos in 1973.

The main objective of the day was to raise global awareness of social changes brought about by the Internet and new technologies. It also aims to help reduce the digital divide.

World Information Society Day

World Information Society Day was an international day proclaimed to be on 17 May by a United Nations General Assembly resolution, following the 2005 World Summit on the Information Society in Tunis.

World Telecommunication and Information Society Day

In November 2006, the ITU Plenipotentiary Conference in Antalya, Turkey, decided to celebrate both events on 17 May as World Telecommunication and Information Society Day.

== All previous topics ==
- 1969 The role and activities of the Union
- 1970 Telecommunications and training
- 1971 Space and Telecommunications
- 1972 World Telecommunication Network
- 1973 International Cooperation
- 1974 Telecommunications and Transportation
- 1975 Telecommunications and Meteorology
- 1976 Telecommunications and Information
- 1977 Telecommunications and Development
- 1978 Radio Communications
- 1979 Telecommunications in the Service of Mankind
- 1980 Rural Telecom
- 1981 Telecommunications and Health
- 1982 International Cooperation
- 1983 One world, One network
- 1984 Telecommunications: a Broad Vision
- 1985 Telecom is Good For Development
- 1986 Partner On The Move
- 1987 Telecom Serves All Countries
- 1988 Dissemination of Technological Knowledge in The Electronic Age
- 1989 International Cooperation
- 1990 Telecommunications and Industrial Development
- 1991 Telecommunications and Human Security
- 1992 Telecommunications and Space: Xintiandi
- 1993 Telecommunications and Human Development
- 1994 Telecommunications and Culture
- 1995 Telecommunications and Environment
- 1996 Telecommunications and Sports
- 1997 Telecommunications and Humanitarian Aid
- 1998 Telecom Trade
- 1999 E-commerce
- 2000 Mobile Communications
- 2001 Internet: Challenges, Opportunities and Prospects
- 2002 Helping People Bridge the Digital Divide
- 2003 Helping all Mankind Communicate
- 2004 Information and Communication Technology: A Path to Sustainable Development
- 2005 Take Action to Create a Fair Information Society
- 2006 Advancing Global Cyber Security
- 2007 Let ICT Benefit The Next Generation
- 2008 Let ICT Benefit People With Disabilities, and Let All People Enjoy ICT Opportunities
- 2009 Protect Children's Online Safety
- 2010 ICT Makes Urban Life Better
- 2011 ICT Makes Rural Life Better
- 2012 Information Communication and Women
- 2013 ICT and Improving Road Safety
- 2014 Broadband Promotes sustainable Development
- 2015 Telecommunications and Information and Communication Technology: Driving Forces of Innovation
- 2016 Promote ICT Entrepreneurship and Expand Social Impact
- 2017 Develop Big Data and Expand Influence
- 2018 Promote the Proper Use of Artificial Intelligence For the Benefit of All Mankind
- 2019 Narrowing the Standardization Gap
- 2020 Connectivity Goal 2030: Using ICT to Promote the Achievement of the Sustainable Development Goals
- 2021 Accelerating Digital Transformation in challenging time
- 2022 Digital technologies for older persons and health ageing
- 2024 Digital Innovation for Sustainable Development
- 2026 Strengthening digital lifelines for a resilient and connected world

== See also ==
- System Administrator Appreciation Day
- Programmers' Day
- World Development Information Day
- World Television Day
