= Keyboard Monument =

Outdoor sculpture by Anatoly Viatkine

Coordinates: 56.832328°N 60.607572°E

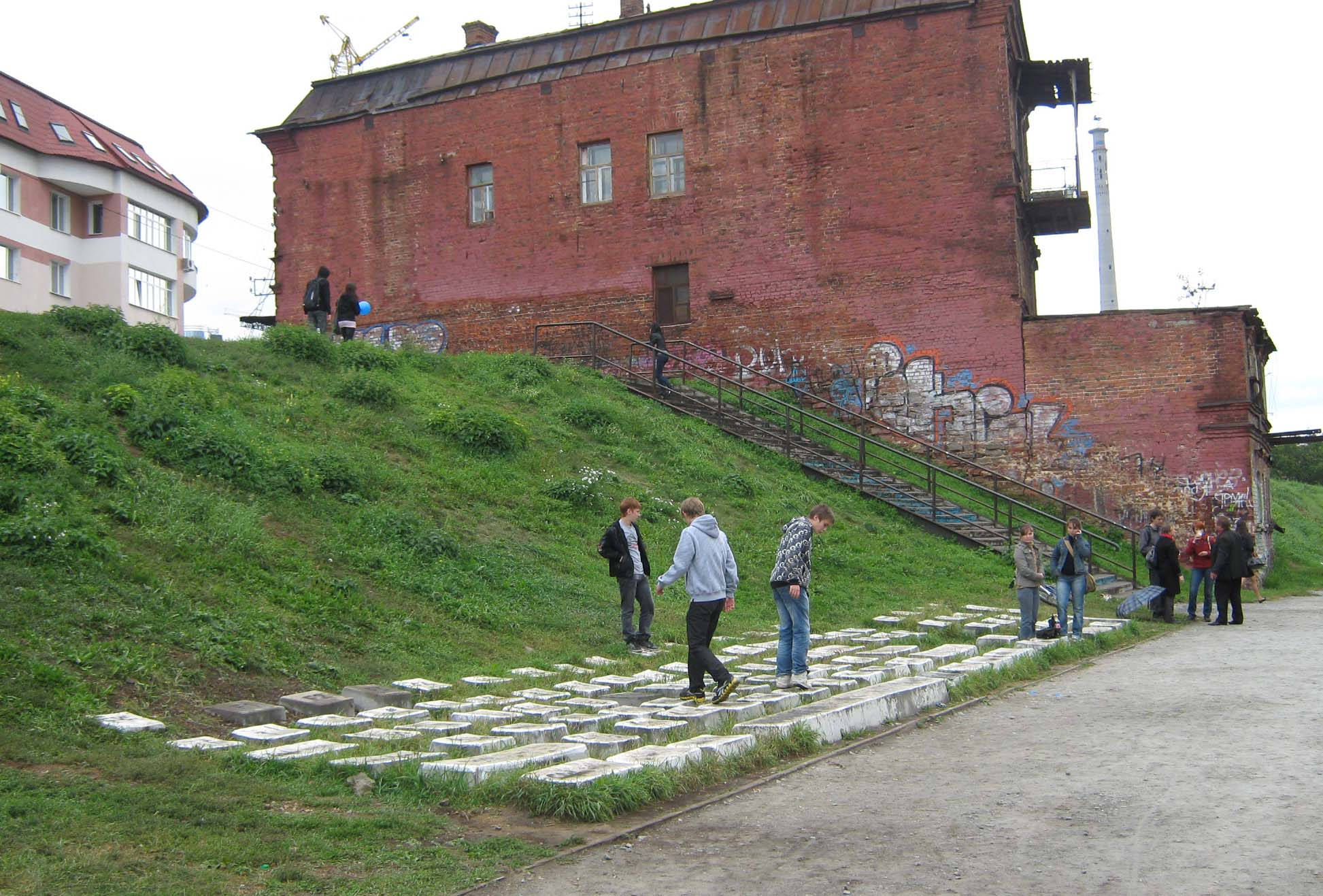
The monument in 2011. The building in the background is sometimes dubbed the computer case

Keyboard Monument (Russian: Памятник клавиатуре) is an outdoor sculpture featuring the QWERTY/ЙЦУКЕН keyboard. It is located in the Russian city of Yekaterinburg and is popular among tourists.

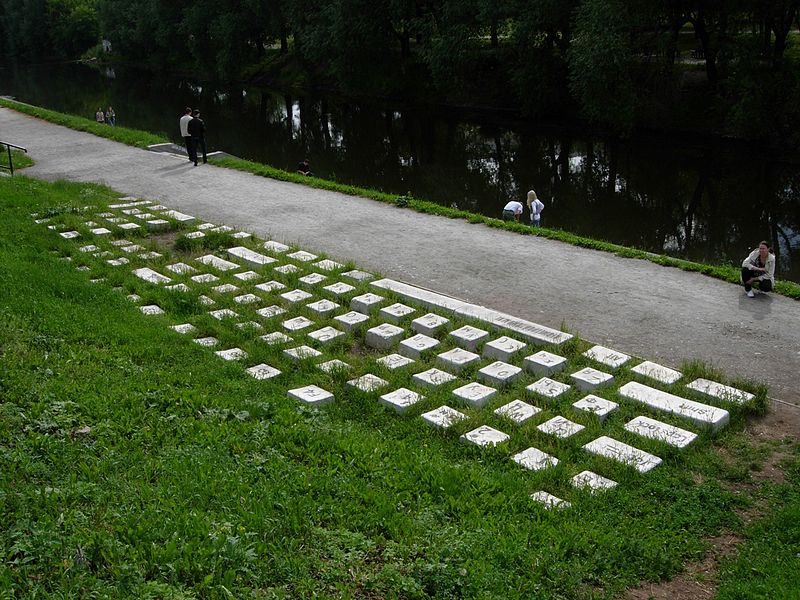
Close-up look with both layouts visible

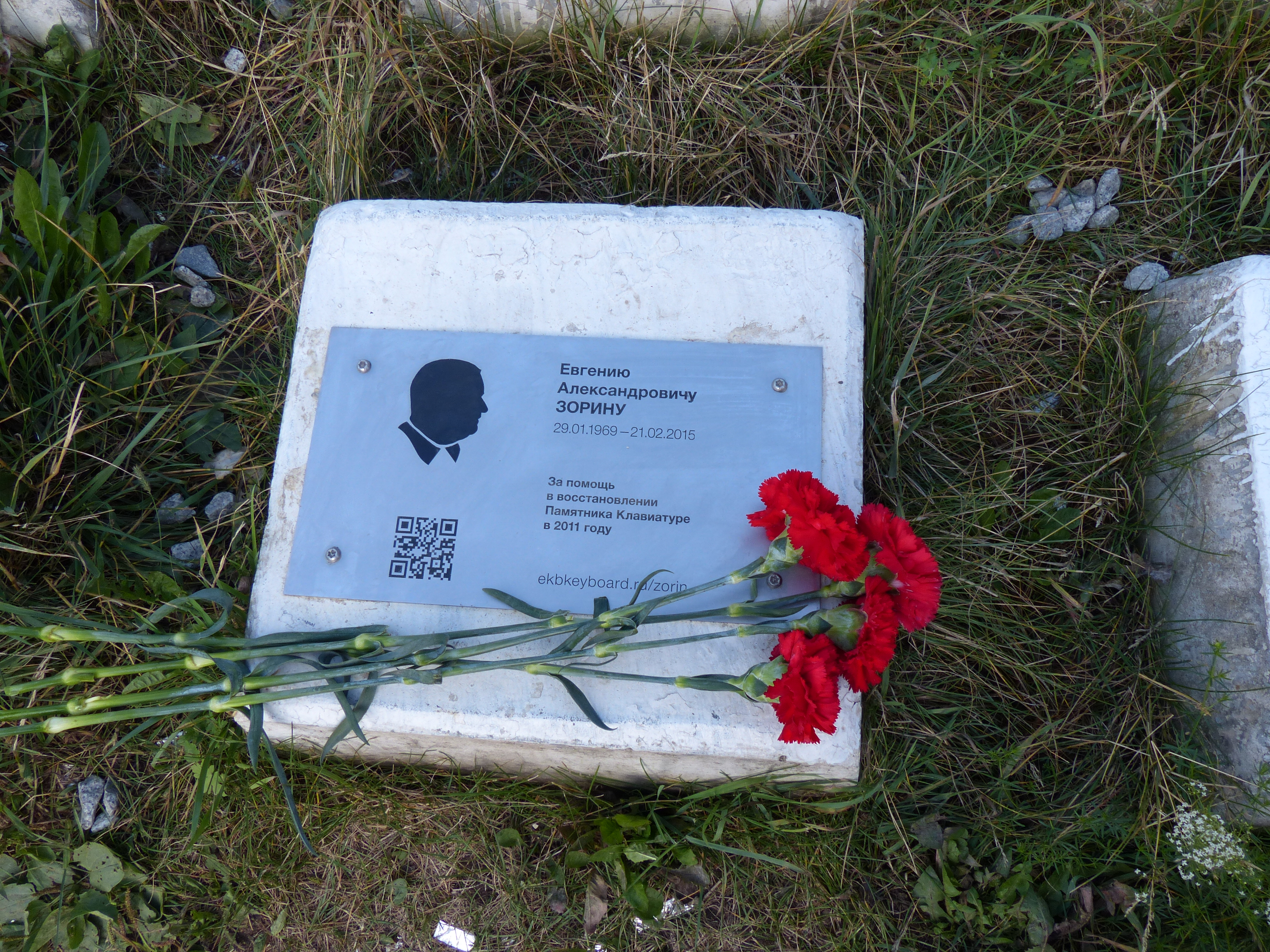
Memorial plaque of Evgeny Zorin on a key End

== History ==
It was created by Anatoly Vyatkin and installed on October 5, 2005 on the embankment of the Iset River in the city centre.

The landmark depicts a Cyrillic computer keyboard at 30:1 scale (the area covered by the monument is 16 m × 4 m), with 104 concrete keys. Each regular key weighs 180 pounds, while the space bar alone weighs 1,000 pounds.

The keyboard attracts many visitors to the city and is today considered one of its top sights. It is also referred to as "one of the miracles of Russia" by some researchers. Niklaus Wirth, Pascal programming language designer, evaluated the object while it was being constructed and found it to be fascinating.

Keys F1, F2, F3, and Y were once stolen and in 2011 were rebuilt.

In 2018, in the course of Russia FIFA World Cup, New York Times newspaper published a long article about the object.

In 2019 a survey by national search engine Yandex found that the Keyboard Monument was the second most searched monument among all of Russia's numerous famous monuments, the first being the Bronze Horseman and the third the Monument to Minin and Pozharsky.

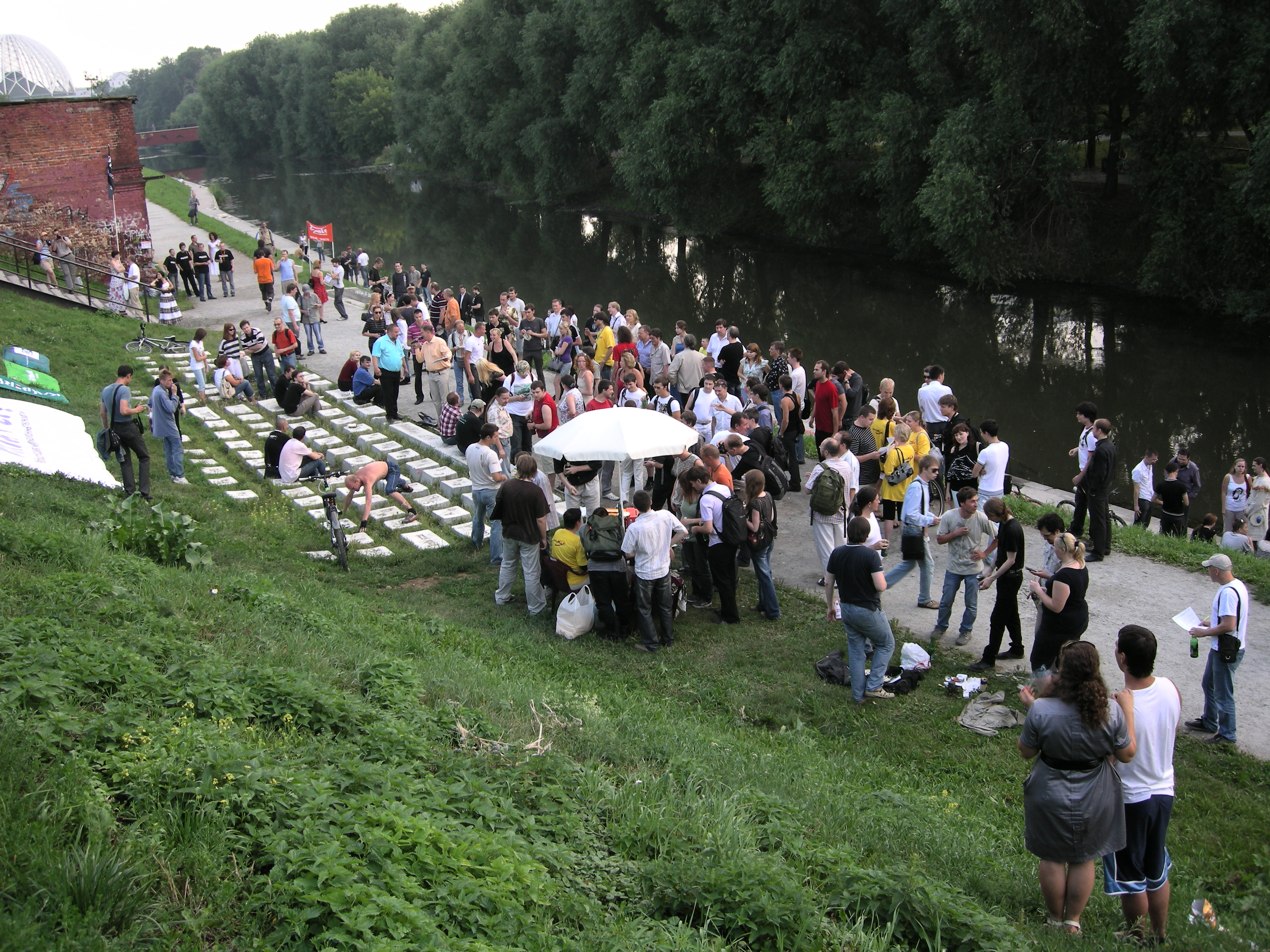
Yekaterinburg Sysadmin Day near Keyboard monument in 2011

In May 2019 it became known that the monument was facing threat of demolition. The nearby stairway was destroyed.

In 2025, the monument was cleaned and restored (with the paint removed from the keys) at the cost of 600,000 rubles donated by local residents and businesses.

== Events ==
Regular celebrations are held near the object. Among them the annual internationally recognised Sysadmin Day on the last Friday in July. Before 2010 Yekaterinburg technicians were gathering at separate places, and since 2010 Yekaterinburg authorities granted official permission for the event to be held near the Keyboard Monument with support from IT companies. There are "sysadmin competitions" between participants: they throw defunct PC mice to reach maximum distance and also throw such mice (with their "tails" cut out) into a distant empty computer case used as basket. Additionally, they powerlift a bundle of unused HDDs. In 2016 during such an event a memorial plaque was set up at the monument to honour Eugene Zorin, the Yekaterinburg FidoNet organiser and Internet pioneer who died recently. In the end of April, the "Keyboard Subbotniks" are also held, when people are cleaning and re-painting the monument, and "sports competitions" also take place. Two volunteers from the USA took part in the procedure in 2017, local press reports.
