= United Nations Day =

Commemorative day on 24 October

- Flag of the United Nations
- Official name: United Nations Day
- Also called: U.N. Day
- Observed by: United Nations
- Type: United Nations organization
- Celebrations: Meetings, discussions, exhibits, cultural performances
- Date: 24 October
- Next time: 24 October 2027
- Frequency: annual
- Related to: World Development Information Day

United Nations Day is an annual commemorative day, reflecting the official creation of the United Nations (UN) on 24 October 1945. In 1947, the United Nations General Assembly declared 24 October, the anniversary of the Charter of the United Nations, to "be devoted to making known to the people of the world the aims and achievements of the United Nations and to gaining their support for" its work.

In 1971, the United Nations General Assembly adopted a further resolution (United Nations Resolution 2782) declaring that United Nations Day shall be an international observance or international holiday and recommended that it should be observed as a public holiday by United Nations member states.

== World War II Allies' day ==
The first event called "United Nations Day" was a World War II Allies' day of solidarity and military parades launched by US president Franklin D. Roosevelt tied to US Flag Day on 14 June 1942, six months after the Declaration by United Nations. It was observed in New York City as the "New York at War" parade, in London, and by the Soviet and Chinese governments.

It was observed throughout World War II, during 1942–1944. Prior to the foundation of the UN itself, it was not directly connected to the current international observance.

== Commemoration ==
U.N. Day has traditionally been marked throughout the world with meetings, discussions and exhibits about the achievements and goals of the organization. In 1971, the General Assembly recommended that member states observe it as a public holiday.

Several international schools throughout the world would also celebrate the diversity of their student body on United Nations Day (although the event is not necessarily celebrated on 24 October). Celebrations often include a show of cultural performances in the evening and a food fair, where food is available from all over the world.

On United Nations Day in 1951, the United Nations Postal Administration issued the first UN Stamps, which were issued in U.S. Dollars at the U.N. Headquarters in New York.

In the United States, the President issued a proclamation each year for United Nations Day from 1948 until 2024.

In Kosovo, which is administered by the Interim Administration Mission, United Nations Day is an official non-working day.

== See also ==
- International Day of United Nations Peacekeepers – Annual tribute to United Nations Peacekeeping personnel
- Africa Day – Commemoration of the founding of the African Union
- Commonwealth Day – Annual celebration in the Commonwealth of Nations
- Europe Day – Annual observance by the European Union
- Global citizenship – Idea that all people have rights and responsibilities from being a member of the world
- International Day of Diplomats – International days
