= Amitava Ghosh =

Researcher and inventor

Amitava Ghosh is an IEEE Fellow and Head of North America Radio Systems Research at Nokia Networks Technology and Innovation since 2011.

== Career ==
Amitabha (Amitava) Ghosh is a Nokia Fellow and Head of Small Cell Research at Nokia Bell Labs. Prior to this, he was Senior Director and Fellow of Technical Staff at Motorola Networks. He is widely cited in the field of wireless technology and has over 60 issued patents as well as 30 patents pending with USPTO. In addition, he is the co-author of the book titled "Essentials of LTE and LTE-A" and have written chapters in other field specific books. He is the author or co-author of approximately 90 IEEE conference and journal papers, which have received more than 3,000 citations. He is currently working on 3GPP LTE-Pro and 5G technologies. His research interests are in the areas of digital communications, digital signal processing and wireless communications.

Dr. Ghosh was named an IEEE Fellow in 2014 for his accomplishments in the telecommunications industry. He is also a Nokia Fellow since 2015 and regular speaker and organizer of the Brooklyn Summit 5G Conference. Telecommunications industry leaders like Adam Koeppe Vice President of Verizon Wireless, Andrew D. Hamilton President of New York University, among others have spoken at this conference.

== Education ==
Ghosh received his Phd in electrical engineering from Southern Methodist University in Dallas, a master's degree from El Paso University, and his bachelor's degree in Calcutta, India.

== Personal life ==
Ghosh resides in Buffalo Grove with his wife, son, and daughter. Apart from digital technology, he is interested in food and travel.

== Selected publications ==
- Ghosh, Amitava, Rapeepat Ratasuk, Bishwarup Mondal, Nitin Mangalvedhe, and Tim Thomas. "LTE-advanced: Next-generation Wireless Broadband Technology [Invited Paper." IEEE Wireless Commun. IEEE Wireless Communications 17.3 (2010): 10-22. Web.
- Ghosh, Amitava, Rapeepat Ratasuk, Bishwarup Mondal, Nitin Mangalvedhe, and Tim Thomas. "LTE-advanced: Next-generation Wireless Broadband Technology [Invited Paper." IEEE Wireless Commun. IEEE Wireless Communications 17.3 (2010): 10-22. Web.
- Ghosh, Amitava, Timothy A. Thomas, Mark C. Cudak, Rapeepat Ratasuk, Prakash Moorut, Frederick W. Vook, Theodore S. Rappaport, George R. Maccartney, Shu Sun, and Shuai Nie. "Millimeter-Wave Enhanced Local Area Systems: A High-Data-Rate Approach for Future Wireless Networks." IEEE J. Select. Areas Commun. IEEE Journal on Selected Areas in Communications 32.6 (2014): 1152-163. Web.
