= Larry Shaw (physicist) =

American physicist and curator (1939–2017)

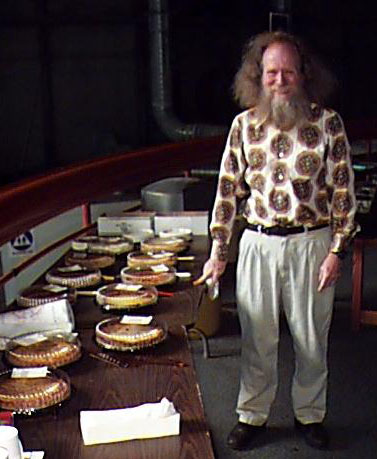
- Shaw in 2007 at the Exploratorium in San Francisco
- Born: Lawrence N. Shaw; August 12, 1939; Washington, D.C., U.S.
- Died: August 19, 2017 (aged 78); Petaluma, California, U.S.
- Education: Reed College (BA)
- Occupations: Physicist; curator; artist

Lawrence N. Shaw (August 12, 1939 – August 19, 2017) was an American physicist, curator, and artist. Shaw worked at the Exploratorium, a San Francisco science museum, for 33 years, performing most functions for the museum. He was a key member of the arts and technology community in the San Francisco Bay Area.

== Early and personal life ==
Lawrence N. Shaw was born in Washington, D.C., on August 12, 1939, to Wilfred L. Shaw and Ida W. Shaw. Larry's father worked for the Department of Agriculture. The family moved to the San Francisco Bay Area in California when he was a year-and-a-half toddler. Larry Shaw graduated from Pleasant Hill High School and received a Bachelor of Arts degree in physics from Reed College in Portland, Oregon in 1961.

At Reed, he met his future wife, Catherine Adams. They were married in 1963 and had two daughters: Tara Shaw, a doctor working in sports medicine, and Sara Shaw, a veterinarian. Larry and Catherine celebrated their wedding anniversary 54 times on the "full moon in June" and had a "re-wedding" every seven years, because the "body has pretty much become new every seven years."

== Career ==
Before Larry Shaw started at the Exploratorium, he worked at the Lawrence Livermore National Laboratory and the University of California, Berkeley, Space Sciences Laboratory in physics-related jobs.

=== Exploratorium ===
When Larry Shaw was hired at the Exploratorium in 1972 by the founder and director, Dr. Frank Oppenheimer, Oppenheimer told Shaw that for a job title, "You can put down anything you want except 'director.'" In a 1994 interview with MicroTimes, Shaw describes his role as technical curator: "I have many hats. Basically, I am looking for technology that furthers the mission of the museum."

Shaw designed and built exhibits. He did engineering for the music and performing arts programs and worked with many of the Artists-in-residence, technically supporting their efforts to extend their visions and turn their sometimes wild ideas into successful exhibits. For example, he helped design hexagonal stepping stones for visitors to dance upon to create music. He would also connect what visitors experienced, like an echo, with other phenomena, like "whistlers" from electrical impulses in our atmosphere. In 2001, he worked with the Exploratorium's Center for Media and Communications to extend the museum's interactive learning environment with multi-media, video and telecommunications. The Exploratorium and Larry Shaw utilized STEAM (Science, Tech, Engineering, Art, Math) to help visitors understand the world, long before the STEAM (or STEM) acronym was used.

"He loved to help people realize they are capable, and that they can get involved in areas of human thought that they thought were closed to them," said his wife. "That’s what the Exploratorium stands for, too."

When Shaw retired in 2005 after 33 years, the then-director Goéry Delacôte told him, "You are the Exploratorium."

=== Pi Day ===
Larry Shaw, the "Prince of Pi", invented the holiday Pi Day in 1988 while at the Exploratorium. During an off-site staff retreat in 1988, he started talking with his co-workers, like Ron Hipschman, about the mysteries of mathematical constants. Shaw came up with the idea to link pi (3.14159…), which begins with 3.14, with the date 3/14 or March 14. Co-workers built on the idea and they had a mini-celebration with just the staff, starting with eating of pies. The next year, the holiday was held for all at the museum and every year since, even when the museum was closed during its move. The celebration includes a parade at 1:59 p.m. with visitors holding a sign with a digit of pi, a pi shrine, eating of pies (fruit and pizza), singing happy birthday to Albert Einstein, and more. Larry Shaw would lead the parade in his red cap with the digits of pi. Pi Day was recognized as a national holiday in 2009 and is internationally celebrated. 2015 was proclaimed by Shaw to be a special year, as it was written 3/14/15, and he called it the "Pi Day of the Century". Shaw felt the best thing about Pi Day was making math more accessible, fun for those who may have had problems in school. When asked if he was proud with events being held around the world, "Yes and no. It's not mine; it's everybody's. I'm just the guy holding the pole."

=== Art and music ===
In addition to helping the artist-in-residence and others at the Exploratorium, he contributed to and supported the arts and technology community.

He was a core member of YLEM: Artists Using Science & Technology For the CyberArts X 10th Anniversary & YLEM 20th Anniversary, he was key for the on-line aspect of the event. At the YLEM Exhibition in December 2001, he showed his piece, "SF Fog, 1967", which "combined the friendly image of the Golden Gate Bridge dissolving in a whirling fractal fog in his digital collage".

He helped put on events related to computer graphics for the local chapters of ACM SIGGRAPH, both the Bay Area ACM SIGGRAPH and later the San Francisco ACM SIGGRAPH chapter. He was also involved at the international level being on the SIGGRAPH 1987 Art Show jury and committee with the conference at the Anaheim Convention Center.

Larry Shaw was called the “GodFather” of the San Francisco Robotics Society of America (SFRSA). SFRSA Mediameister Cliff Thompson said in a 2001 tribute, "Seemingly hardly known & working deftly behind the scenes, Larry has over the years been at the engineering epi-center of more profoundly transformative technological, scientific & cultural experiences than anyone I know."

He also composed and performed electronic music (The Coagulation of Time) and made electronic harmoniums.

After retiring, he had more time pursuing his artistic passion of turning his photos into beautiful abstractions. He continued volunteering as an audio engineer for non-profits.

== Buddhism ==
Larry Shaw and his wife Catherine, who had a degree in Buddhism, visited, practiced and studied at Buddhist sites all over the world. He and his family joined the Buddhist Temple of Marin in 1985. He served several terms as president. His obituary in the San Francisco Chronicle described him: "He was a true bodhisattva, always willing and able to help all in need, and to share his knowledge and insights. All who knew him attest to his extreme good cheer, contagious enthusiasm, amazing range of interests, seemingly in-exhaustible energy, and genuine, unforced loving regard toward everyone."
