= List of vice chancellors of the University of Kashmir =

Vice chancellors of Kashmir University

List of vice chancellors of the University of Kashmir.

The vice chancellors are as follows:

S no.	Name	Term	Ref.
1.	Qazi Masood Hassan	(1948-1949)	
2.	Justice J. N. Wazir	(1949-1957)	
3.	A.A.A Fyzee	(1957-1960)	
4.	Sardar K.M Panikar	(1961-1963)	
5.	Prof. T.M Advani	(1963-1967)	
6.	Dr. J.N Bhan	(1967-1969)	
7.	Kh. Noor-ud-Din	(1969-1973)	
8.	R.H Chisti	(1973-1974)	
9.	Prof Rais Ahmed	(1978-1981)	
10.	Prof. Wahid-ud-Din Malik	(1981-1984)	
11.	Prof. Shah Manzoor Alam	(1984-1987)	
12.	Prof. Mushir-ul-Haq	(1987-1990)	
13.	Prof. H.U Hamidi	(1990-1993)	
14.	Prof. M.Y Qadri	(1994-2001)	
15.	Prof. J. A. K. Tareen	(2001-2004)	
16.	Prof. Abdul Wahid	(2004-2008)	
17.	Prof. Riyaz Punjabi	(2008-2011)	
18.	Talat Ahmad	(2011-2014)	
19.	Khurshid Iqbal Andrabi	(2014-2018)	
20.	Talat Ahmad	(2018-2022)	
21.	Nilofer Khan (First women Vice-Chancellor)	(2022-2027)	
