= SAARC Literary Award =

Literary award given by SAARC's literary wing to the writers from SAARC countries

- Award to individuals from SAARC Countries for contributions to Literature
- Awarded for: Literary award in South Asia
- Sponsored by: FOSWAL
- First award: 2001
- Website: foundationsaarcwriters.com

SAARC Literary Award is an annual award conferred by the Foundation of SAARC Writers and Literature (FOSWAL) since 2001 Shamshur Rahman, Mahasweta Devi, Jayanta Mahapatra, Abhi Subedi, Mark Tully, Sitakant Mahapatra, Uday Prakash, Suman Pokhrel, and Abhay K have been some of the recipients of this award.

Nepali poet, lyricist, and translator Suman Pokhrel is the only writer to have received the award twice, having been honored in 2013 and 2015.

== Award recipients ==
The year wise list of the award recipients are as follows:

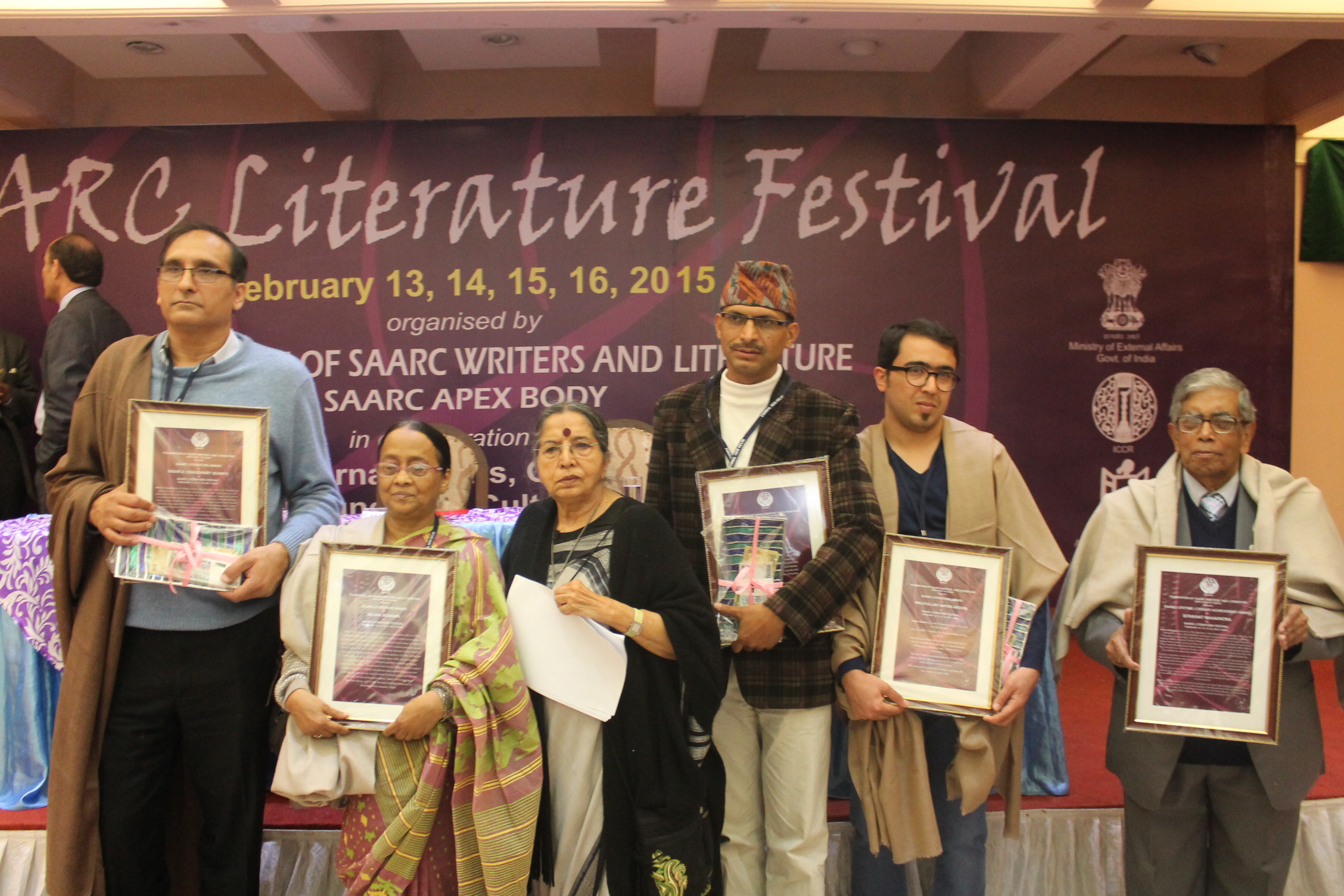
Group photo of SAARC Literary Award 2015 recipients

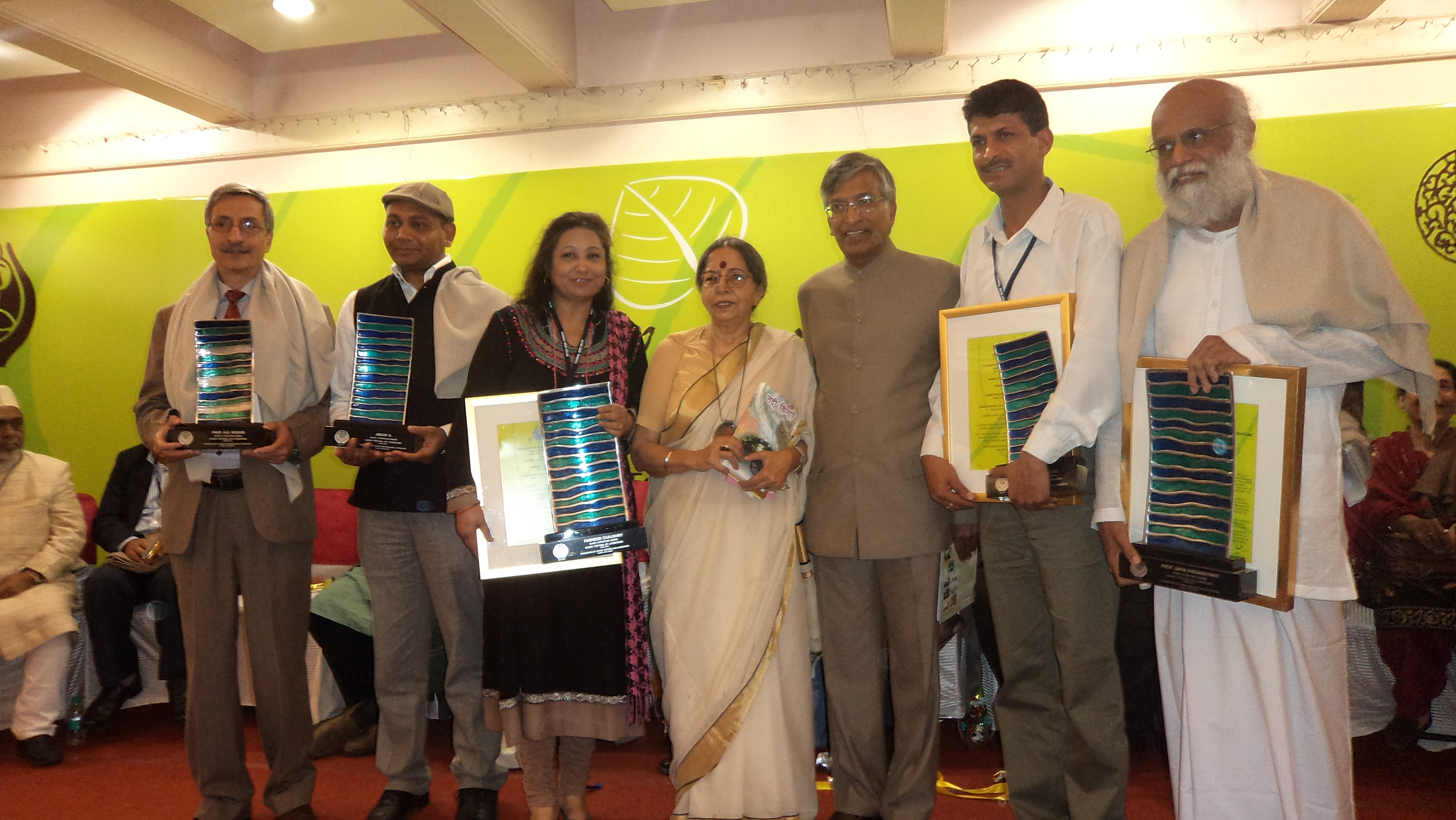
Recipients of SAARC Literary Award 2013

Year	Poet/Writer	Nationality
2001	Ganesh Narayandas Devy	India
2001	Shamsur Rahman	Bangladesh
2002	Laxmi Chand Gupta	India
2006	Maitreyi Pushpa	India
2006	Zahida Hina	Pakistan
2006	Laxman Gaikwad	India
2006	Tissa Abeysekara	Sri Lanka
2007	Mahasveta Devi	India
2009	Jayanta Mahapatra	India
2009	Uday Prakash	India
2009	Kamaal Khan	India
2010	Hamid Mir	Pakistan
2010	Abhi Subedi	Nepal
2010	Mark Tully	India
2010	Ju	Burma
2011	Ibrahim Waheed	Maldives
2011	Syed Akhtar Hussain Akhtar (posthumous)	Pakistan
2012	Fakrul Alam	Bangladesh
2012	Ayesha Zee Khan	Pakistan
2013	Abhay K	India
2013	Suman Pokhrel	Nepal
2013	Farheen Chaudhary	Pakistan
2013	Abdul Khaliq Rashid	Afghanistan
2013	Daya Dissanayake	Sri Lanka
2014	Tarannum Riyaz	India
2015	Sitakant Mahapatra	India
2015	Selina Hossain	Bangladesh
2015	Suman Pokhrel	Nepal
2015	Nisar Ahmad Chaudhary	Pakistan
2015	Aryan Aroon	Afghanistan
2018	Najibullah Manalai	Afghanistan
2019	Mohammad Nurul Huda	Bangladesh
2019	Ashraf Ali	Maldives
2019	Bhishma Upreti	Nepal
2023	Chador Wangmo	Bhutan

FOSWAL also confers the SAARC Young Writers Award on emerging poets and writers from South Asian countries. Its recipients include Khalida Froagh, Rubana Huq, Vivimarie Vanderpoorten, Nanda Tint Swe, Manu Manjil, Nayyara Rahman and Shahida Shaheen among other. Unlike the SAARC Literary Award, which is presented to eminent poets, writers, and journalists, it is intended to recognize emerging poets and writers.
