= Geeta Tripathee =

Nepali poet

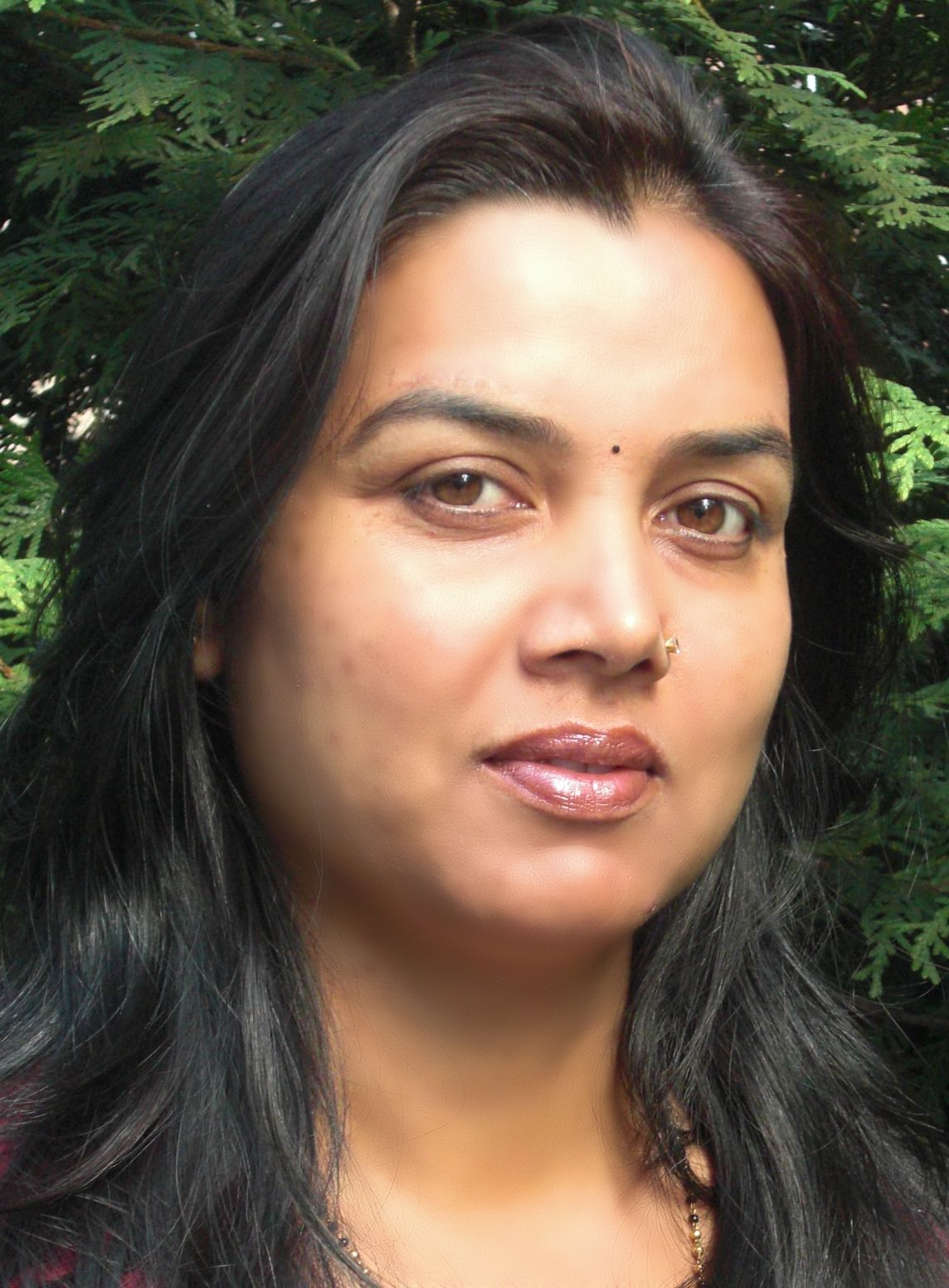
- Poet Geeta Tripathee
- Born: 28 June 1972 (age 54); Kharelthok, Nepal
- Education: PhD in Nepali Literature
- Alma mater: Tribhuvan University
- Occupations: Poet, Songwriter
- Spouse: Yadavraj Tripathee
- Children: Samip Tripathee
- Parent: Bedraj Thapaliya (Father) Ramadevi Thapaliya (Mother)
- Writing career
- Notable works: Nrishamsha Parkhalharu; Simalko Geet
- Notable awards: Padmakanya Gold Medal (2000); Best Lyricist Award (2008)

Geeta Tripathee (Nepali: गीता त्रिपाठी; born 28 June 1972) is a Nepali poet, lyricist, essayist, literary critic and scholar. An eminent writer in Nepali, Geeta Tripathee has two volumes of poetry collection, one of lyrical poems and seven books in other literary genre to her credit. She also writes for newspapers on issues concerning women, environment and societal injustice.

Geeta Tripathee is the recipient of 'Padmakanya Gold Medal - 2000', conferred by the Government of Nepal. She received 'Best Lyricist Award' in 2008 from 'Sanskritik Sansthan', the major cultural adjunct of Nepal Government.

== Early life ==
Geeta Tripathee was born on June 28, 1972, in Kharelthok, Kavrepalanchok to an educator Bedraj Thapaliya and Ramadevi Thapaliya. She completed her high school education in Kharelthok in 1988, and moved to Kathmandu for further education. Tripathee joined Padma Kanya Multiple Campus in Kathmandu and graduated in 1993. She married Yadavraj Tripathee in 1989 while studying in Padmakanya college. Tripathee continued her study and completed her Master's degree in Nepali literature in 1998 with a gold medal by becoming the university topper. After completing her master's degree, she started teaching the subject of her interest and choice in different colleges under Tribhuvan University and Purbanchal University. Tripathee kept her writing carrier continued during her college days and afterwards. Later, she earned PhD in Nepali literature from Tribhuvan University in 2017.

== Career ==
Geeta Tripathee is a multi-genre writer. She has written two books of poetry, one book of lyrical poems, one book of essays and several books on literary criticism.

Geeta Tripathee's works are translated into other languages like English, Hindi, Japanese and Korean; and are published in notable literary journals abroad. Tripathee has taken part in numbers of national and international literary events as a poet, presenter and speaker. Tripathee participated in South Asian Literature Festivals organized by Foundation of SAARC Writers and Literature in New Delhi in 2010 and 2017 as Nepali delegate poet.

As a literary critic, Tripathee has analyzed the works of several prominent Nepali writers and poets, including notable late figures such as Laxmi Prasad Devkota, Shankar Lamichhane, and Madhav Prasad Ghimire, as well as eminent contemporary poets and writers like Suman Pokhrel, Sanu Sharma and Neelam Karki Niharika among others. Her in-depth critiques have been published both as books and in various esteemed literary journals and newspapers. Through her work, she has contributed to the appreciation and understanding of contemporary literature, shedding light on the thematic depth and stylistic nuances of these authors' writings.

== Works ==
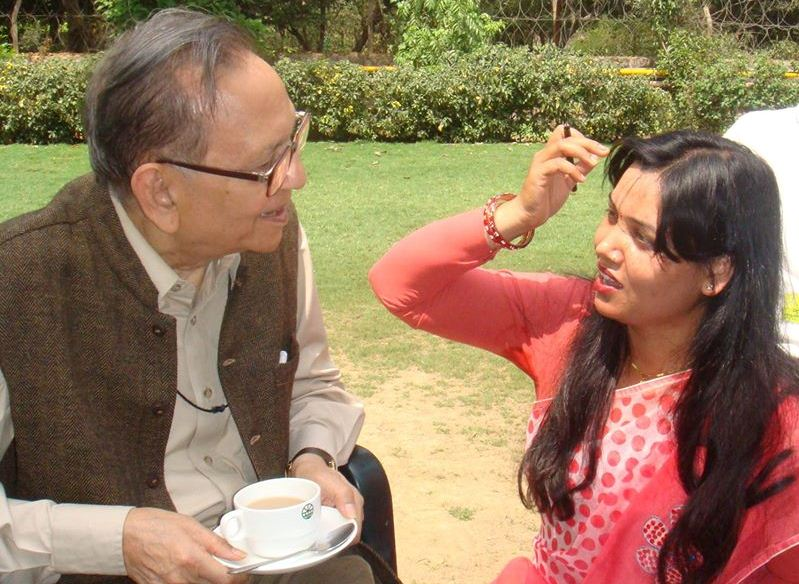
Geeta Tripathee with Indian poet Kunwar Narayan during SAARC Literature Festival 2010 in New Delhi

=== Books ===
- Thunga Banfulka (2005)(Collection of lyrical poems)
- Dui Haraf Othharu (2008) (Collection of lyrical poems) (co-written with poet Manjul)
- Nrisamsha Parkhalharu (2009) (Collection of lyrical poems)
- Ma Eklo Ra Udaas Ustai (2014) (Collection of essays)
- Simal Ko Geet (2015) (Collection of lyrical poems)
- Drishtibicharan (2009) (Literary criticism)
- Kriti Bishleshan : Prayogik Aayam (2010) (Literary criticism)
- Bishwanari Nepali Sahitya : Parampara ra Prabriti (2015) (Literary criticism)
- Nepali Mahila Lekhan : Prabriti ra Yogdaan (2015) (Literary criticism)
- Nepali Niyatra : Siddhanta ra Prayog (2017) (Literary criticism)
- Paryawaran ra Narikendri Samalochana (2018) (Literary criticism)

=== Music Album ===
- Eklai… Eklai (2005)
- Saramsha (2009)

== Awards ==
- Padmakanya Gold Medal
- Best Lyricist Award

== See also ==
- List of Nepalese poets
