= Abhi Subedi =

Nepalese poet and writer (born 1945)

- अभि सुवेदी
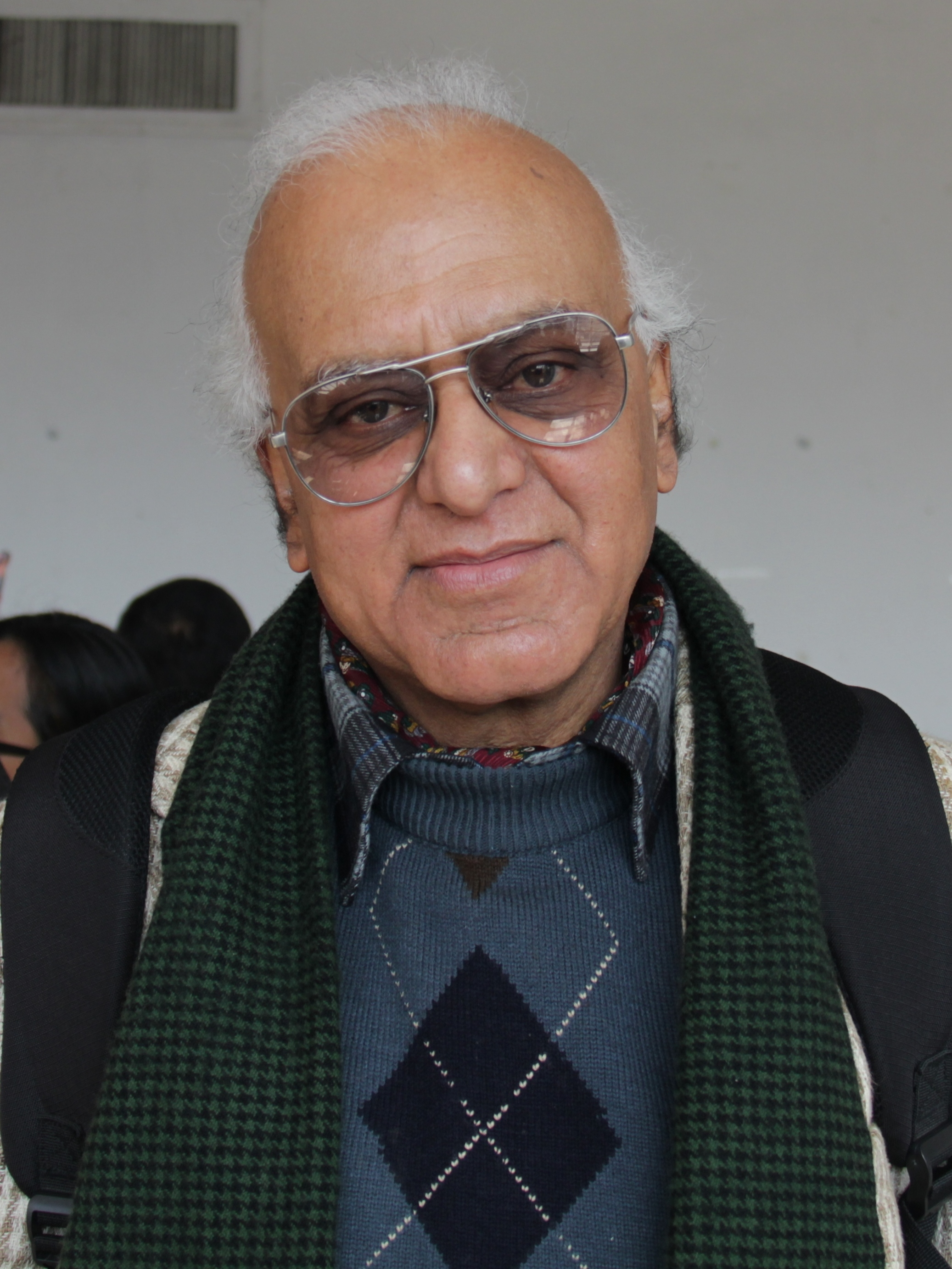
- Abhi Subedi at Folklore Congress Nepal
- Born: Abhi Narayan Subedi; 30 June 1945 (age 81); Sabla village, Tehrathum, Nepal
- Education: Tribhuvan University, Nepal; University of Edinburgh, Scotland.
- Occupations: Poet, playwright, translator, linguist
- Notable work: Agniko Katha
- Spouse: Bindu Subedi
- Children: 2
- Awards: SAARC Literary Award

Abhi Subedi (Nepali: अभि सुवेदी; born June 30, 1945) is a Nepali poet, playwright, columnist, translator and critic, who writes in Nepali and English.

== Biography ==
Abhi Subedi was born in Sabla village of Tehrathum district in eastern Nepal. He was the 21st child of his father and the 7th child of his mother. He recognized Bengali letters before Devnagari scripts after seeing his mother read Bengali epic Kashiram Das's Mahabharata.

== Education ==
Abhi Subedi was offered a British Council scholarship to the University of Edinburgh in 1978 and completed his post-graduate degree. He wrote about his struggle for education viz a viz the Thatcher government's cut on foreign scholarships and grants and the bureaucratic malice of his university back home.

He earned a Ph.D. on the pragmatics of poetry from Tribhuvan University, Kirtipur and did postgraduate work in stylistics and applied linguistics at the University of Edinburgh in Scotland.

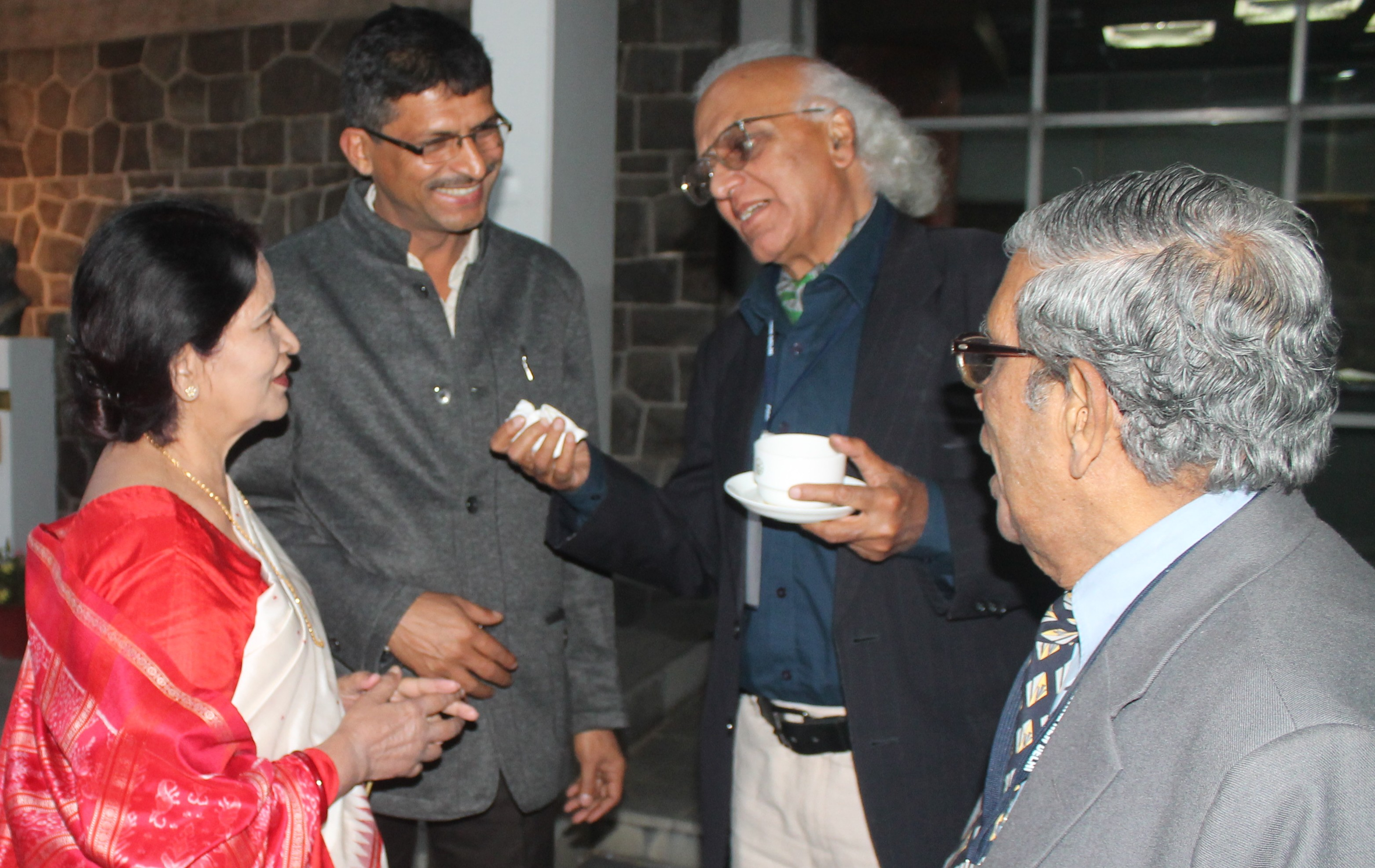
Abhi Subedi with Suman Pokhrel, Sitakanta Mahapatra and Pratibha Ray during South Asian Literature Festival in New Delhi in February 2017

== Career ==
Subedi started as a teacher of English at Tribhuvan University and after returning from Europe taught stylistics there. He taught for 40 years at the Central Department of English in Tribhuvan University, and headed the department for more than a decade. Subedi is vice-President of the Nepali Folklore Society of Nepal. He is the founding former president of the International Theatre Institute (ITI) UNESCO from 2000 to 2008 and member of International Playwright's Forum from 2000 to 2011. Subedi became President (1990-1992) and two times General Secretary of the Linguistic Society of Nepal. He was also President of the Literary Association of Nepal. He is a member of the International Association of Theatre Critics. He has been involved in a number of interdisciplinary study groups and is a prolific writer on issues of freedom, culture, literature, arts and social transformation. His essays and seminar papers have been published in Nepal and abroad.

== Works ==
Subedi has published over two dozen books on different subjects. Several of his plays have been performed by well-known theatre groups in Nepal and abroad. Abhi Subedi's poem, "Soft Storm," is a part of the National Book of Nepal for Class 12 students.

=== Books in Nepali ===
- Flaneurko Diary (2015/2071)
- Sahitya ra Aambritta (Criticism) 2013/2070)
- Chiriyeka Sanjhharu (play) 2011
- Nibandhama Uttarbarti Kaalkhanda (essays) 2009
- Teen Natak (three plays) 2008
- Nibandha ra Tundikhel, 2008
- Paanch Natak (five plays) 2004
- Carpettangieko Aakaas (essays) 1998
- Shavda ra Chot (poems), 1997
- Madhyam ra Rachana (literary criticism), 1997
- Paschatya Kavy Siddhanta, (Western criticism) 1973
- Sirjana ra Mulyankan (literary criticism),1982

=== Books in English ===
- Forever Arriving 2024 (collection of poems)
- Bruised Evenings 2011 (play)
- Nepali Theatre as I See It, 2007
- Three Plays. Trans Sangita Rayamajhi, 2003
- Dreams of Peach Blossoms, 2001, 2012 (play)
- Ekai Kawaguchi: the Trespassing Insider, 1999
- Chasing Dreams: Kathmandu Odyssey, (poetic play)
- Nepali Literature: Background and History, 1978
- Manas (English poems), joint collection with Peter J. Karthak, 1974

=== Translations, editing and joint collections ===
- Aadhunik Japani Kavita, 1987
- Poems of the Century, 2000
- Voices from Nepal (joint work), 1999
- Beyond Borders: an Anthology of SAARC Poetry, 2002
- Japani Haiku: Hijor ra Aaja, 1987
- Japani Noh Naatak, 1989
- Samakalin Nepali Kavita, 1996
- Biswosahityako Aithihashik Rooprekha, 1974
- Pacchisbarshakaa Nepali Kavita, 1982

== Ecology and Conservation ==
His keynote speech at the Nepal Year of Conservation 2009 UK Celebration hosted by the Zoological Society of London was published in the Kathmandu Post on 25 November 2009. In his address he stated that the plentifulness of animals and the perennial existence of opulent nature was a myth and gave examples of visual dramatisation of animals in relation with hegemonic power structures.

== Awards ==
- SAARC Literary Award 2010 - Foundation of SAARC Writers and Literature
- Yug Kavi Siddhicharan Award 2013

== See also ==
- List of Nepali translators
