= Tarannum Riyaz =

Indian writer (1960–2021)

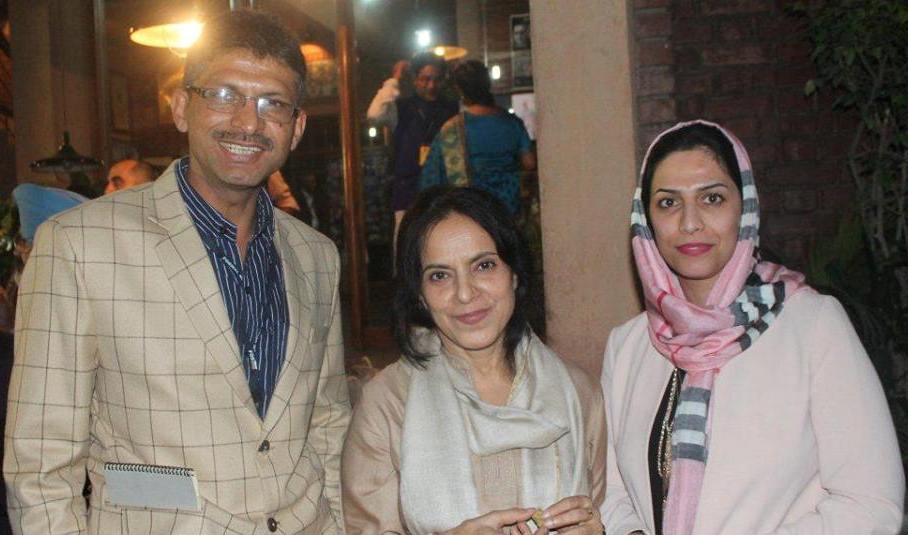
Nepali poet Suman Pokhrel, Riyaz (in middle) and Afghan poet Somaia Ramish at the 2017 South Asian Literature Festival in New Delhi

Tarannum Riyaz (9 August 1960 – 20 May 2021) was an Indian writer and a senior fellow with the Indian Ministry of Culture.

== Biography ==
Tarannum Riyaz was born on 9 August 1960. Students in several universities in India have done their M.Phil. and Ph.D. research on the works of Tarannum Riyaz. She lectured in institutions of art and literature in India and abroad. Her books are part of the curriculum in different levels of educational institutions in India.

== Death ==
Riyaz died from COVID-19 in 2021, a month after the death of her husband, Riyaz Punjabi.

== Published works ==
- "Zer e Sabza Mehw e Khwaab" (poetry – 2015)
- "Ajnabee Jazeeron Men" (essays – 2015)
- "Bhadon K Chaand Taley" (poetry – 2015)
- Barf Aashna Parindey (novel – 2009, second edition 2010; Hindi edition 2013)
- Meraa Rakhte Safar (short stories – 2008)
- Fareb E Khitta E Gul (4 novellas – 2008)
- Purani Kitaabon Ki Khusbhu (poetry – 2005)
- Chashme Naqshe Kadam (critical essay – 2005)
- Beeswi Sadi Mein Khawateen Ka Urdu Adab (anthology – 2005)
- Moorti (novel – 2002)
- Yimberzal (short stories – 2002)
- Abbabeelain Laut Aaengi (short stories – 2000)
- Yeh Tang Zameen (short stories – 1998)
