= Chador Wangmo =

Bhutanese writer

- Born: c. 1980
- Occupation: Writer
- Awards: SAARC Literary Award

Chador Wangmo (born c. 1981) is a Bhutanese novelist and children's book writer. She is one of the most popular novelists in Bhutan.

Wangmo was a schoolteacher before becoming a full-time writer, writing in both English and Dzongkha. She initially published children's books but turned to novels after the death of her mother, whose life inspired her first novel, La Ama... a mother’s call (2015). Her second novel, Kyetse... destiny’s call (2016), is about a young woman, Sonam Dema, who narrowly escapes becoming the victim of sex trafficking. Her children's books include a trilogy about a female superhero named Dema, beginning with Dema: Mystery of the Missing Egg (2017).

She was awarded the SAARC Literary Award by the Foundation of SAARC Writers and Literature (FOSWAL) in 2023.
