= Talat Ahmad =

Indian Earth scientist and professor

Doctor Talat Ahmad FNA FASc FNASc
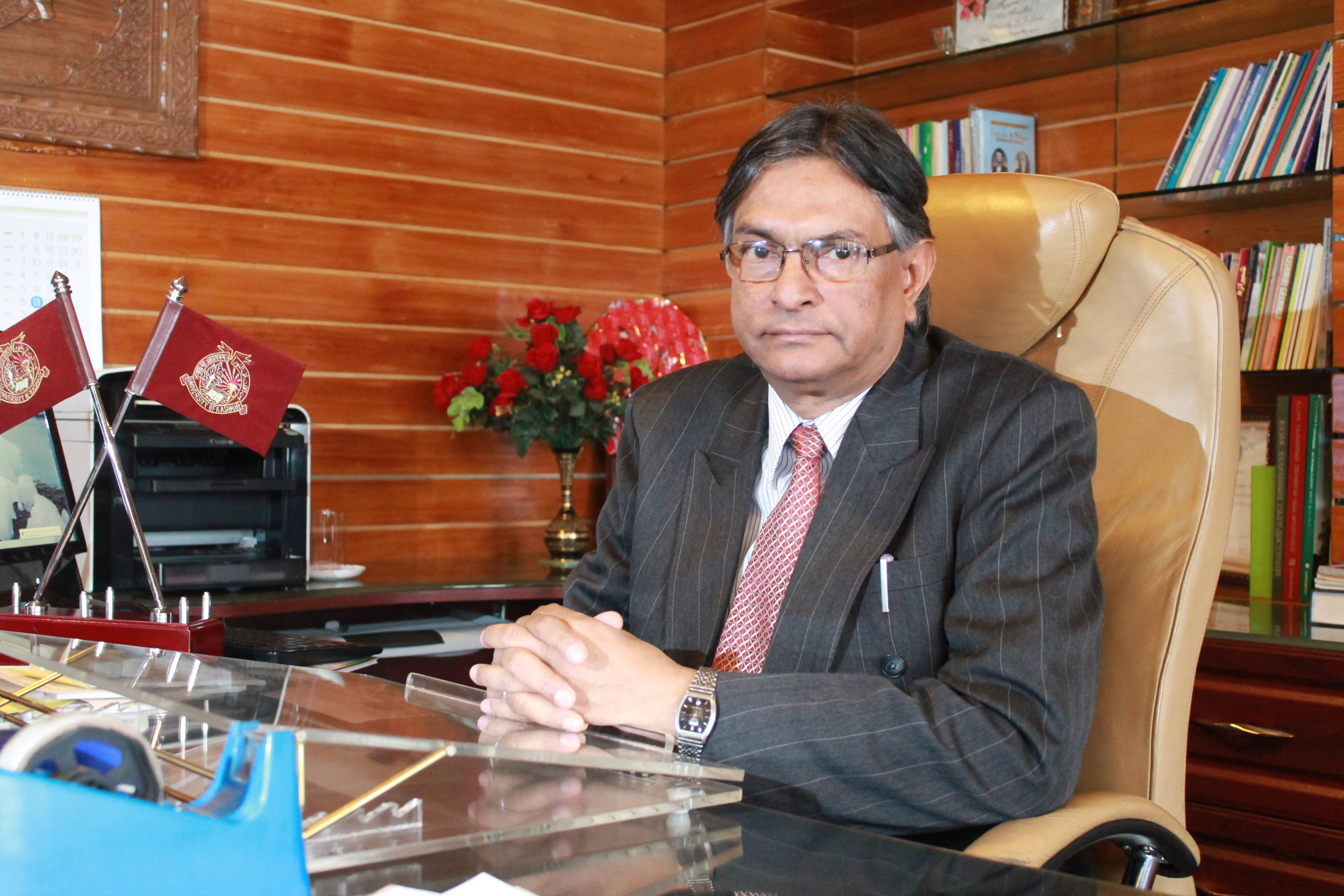

14th Chairman of Governing body of Wadia Institute of Himalayan Geology
- In office 1 December 2021 – 30 November 2024
- Preceded by: Prof.Ashok Sahni
- Succeeded by: Shailesh Nayak

20th Vice-chancellor of University of Kashmir
- In office 6 August 2018 – 20 May 2022
- Chancellor: G. C. Murmu; Manoj Sinha
- Preceded by: Khurshid Iqbal Andrabi
- Succeeded by: Nilofer Khan

14th Vice-chancellor of Jamia Millia Islamia
- In office 15 May 2014 – 6 August 2018
- Chancellor: Najma Heptulla
- Preceded by: Najeeb Jung
- Succeeded by: Najma Akhtar

18th Vice-chancellor of University of Kashmir
- In office 1 June 2011 – 14 May 2014
- Preceded by: Professor Riyaz Punjabi
- Succeeded by: Khurshid Iqbal Andrabi

Personal details
- Born: 23 December 1955 (age 70) Giridih, Bihar, India (present-day Jharkhand, India)
- Spouse: Nasrin Sedghi
- Children: 3
- Education: Jawaharlal Nehru University, Delhi; Aligarh Muslim University
- Profession: Geologist

Talat Ahmad (born 23 December 1955) is an Indian Earth scientist, former professor at the Department of Geology, University of Delhi and served as Indian National Science Academy (INSA) Senior Scientist. He served as Chairman of Governing body which oversees Wadia Institute of Himalayan Geology, Dehradun from 1 December 2021 (full charge from 1 June 2022) onwards and served the office till 30 November 2024 and thereafter as a member of Governing body (WIHG) from 1 December 2024 till 30 November 2027.

Previously, he commenced his second stint as Vice-Chancellor of University of Kashmir on 6 August 2018 and served the office till 20 May 2022. Before that, he served as Vice Chancellor of Jamia Millia Islamia, he resigned from the post a few months short of his full term. He was shortlisted by a committee constituted by the governor to shortlist a panel for the post. He had earlier taken over as Vice-Chancellor of University of Kashmir from Professor Riyaz Punjabi on 1 June 2011 and served there until the year 2014. Prior to this, he was teaching Geology at the University of Delhi.

Ahmad was selected to serve a second term as Vice Chancellor University of Kashmir after he was selected by Governor of Jammu and Kashmir Narinder Nath Vohra in his capacity as chancellor of the State University. He was handed over charge by Professor Khurshid Iqbal Andrabi who had been serving as officiating Vice-Chancellor since October 2017 after his tenure was over.

During his first tenure, Ahmad was recommended for the position of Vice-Chancellor, University of Kashmir by a search committee headed by a former member of the Planning Commission, Prof. Abid Hussain, former Indian ambassador to the US, and comprising Professor G. K. Chadha, CEO, South Asian University and former Vice-Chancellor, Jawaharlal Nehru University, and Prof. Seyed E. Hasnain, an eminent scientist and former Vice-Chancellor of University of Hyderabad.

Ahmad is the first vice chancellor to serve a second term and the second vice chancellor to be appointed from outside the state of Jammu and Kashmir in the past two decades. Jalees Ahmad Khan Tareen was the first vice-chancellor from outside the state who ran the office from 2001 to 2004.

== Early life ==
Ahmad was born and brought up in a small town of Giridih, Jharkhand. His father was Moinuddin Ahmad.

== Education ==
Ahmad did his schooling at Giridih Higher Secondary School. In 1972, he joined Aligarh Muslim University to pursue a BSc in geology, which he completed in 1975. Subsequently, he pursued an MSc in geology, which was awarded to him in 1977. He completed his M.Phil in Ore Petrology from Jawaharlal Nehru University in 1980. In 1985, he completed his PhD in Igneous Petrology from Jawaharlal Nehru University.

He did a postdoctoral fellowship with University of Leicester during 1988–89 under a Government of India Fellowship and another from University of Cambridge under Natural Environment Research Council (NERC) during 1997–98. In 1999–2000, he did another postdoctoral fellowship under Japanese Society for Promotion of Science (JSPS) with Nagoya University, Japan.

== Career ==
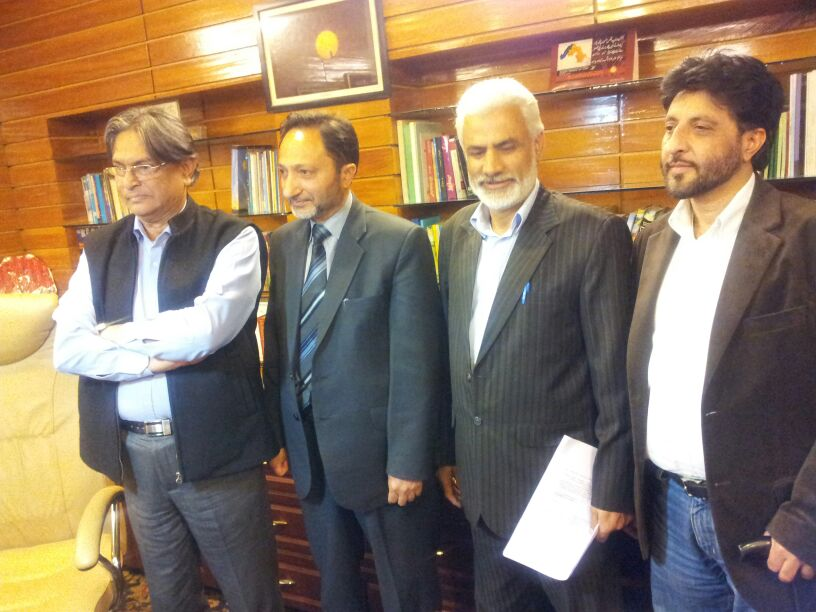
A M Shah relieving Ahmad from his assignment as vice-chancellor on 14 May 2014

In 1979, Ahmad got selected in the UPSC and started working as a junior geologist with the Geological Survey of India (GSI) and formally joined GSI in February 1980. He worked there for a year, but left it soon after as for him, it was more of a survey and less of research. Later, he worked as a Scientist with Wadia Institute of Himalayan Geology, Dehra Dun from 16 July 1984 to 3 September 1989. Ahmad worked at the Wadia Institute of Himalayan Geology, Dehra Dun, as a scientist under DST for nineteen years (1984–2003).

He joined the Department of Geology, University of Delhi as a professor on 31 October 2003. There he started a project in central India and Rajasthan, in addition to research work in Himalayas. He got another project, Russian Foundation for Basic Research (RFBR) after coming to the valley of Kashmir.

He took over as vice-chancellor of University of Kashmir on 1 June 2011.

On 29 April 2014, Ahmad was appointed as the Vice-Chancellor of Jamia Millia Islamia, New Delhi. Pursuant to the permission of the chancellor of the university, Ahmad was relieved from the post by A M Shah, dean of academic affairs of the university. Ahmad joined Jamia Millia Islamia on 15 May 2014, taking over from officiating Vice-Chancellor Prof S M Sajid and thus succeeded Najeeb Jung after he was sworn in as the 20th lieutenant governor of Delhi in April 2013.

In 2018, Ahmad was appointed as Vice-Chancellor of Kashmir University for the second time and served the office till 20 May 2022. Subsequently, he was nominated by Department of Science and Technology under the aegis of Government of India as Chairman of Governing body which oversees Wadia Institute of Himalayan Geology, Dehradun on 1 December 2021 for a term of three years till 30 November 2024 and thereafter as a member of the Governing body(WIHG) from 1 December 2024 till 30 November 2027. Also, he served as Indian National Science Academy (INSA) Senior Scientist.

== Research ==
Ahmad has over 65 research publications to his credit. He has supervised several M.Phil. and PhD research studies at the University of Delhi and the Research School of Earth Sciences, Australian National University, Canberra, Australia.

He has been working on various sponsored projects, including Geochemical, Isotopic and Geochronological characterisation of Granotoids from the Central Indian Tectonic Zones (CITZ) and Central Indian Shear Zones (CISZ)-Constraints on Pre-cambrian Crystal Evolution, funded by Indo-Russian, ILTP Project, and Proterozoic mafic magmatism in the Central Indian Tectonic Zone (CITZ): elemental and isotopic constraints on crystal evolution and geodynamics.

== Fellowships and awards ==
Ahmad had the memberships of many was a recipient of the following fellowships and awards:

- Fellow of Indian Academy of Sciences, Bangalore
- Fellow of Indian National Science Academy, New Delhi
- Fellow of National Academy of Sciences, Allahabad
- National Mineral Award, from the Government of India in 1994.
- J C Bose National Fellowship 2011
- S.M. Naqvi Gold Medal 2013

== Memberships and honours ==
Ahmad bore memberships of prestigious societies and was a recipient of many prestigious honours.

- Life member and executive committee member of Alumni Association of JNU (JNU, New Delhi)
- Life member of Mineralogical Society of India
- Honorary research associate of the department of geology, University of Leicester, UK
- Associate member, Wadia Institute of Himalayan Geology Society
- Member, editorial advisory board of the Indian Journal of Geochemistry
- Member, advisory committee for DRS, Department of Geology, University of Rajasthan, Jaipur
- Member, expert panel for the Science and Engineering Research Council
- Member, National Assessment and Accreditation Council (NAAC) UGC
- Member, "Deep Continental Studies Programme" of the Department of Science and Technology, New Delhi
- Convener, Vision Committee for Perspective Planning for the Academic Activities of Department of Geology, University of Delhi, Delhi
- Regional coordinator, International Geological Correlation Programme, member, Working Group for Geology for the National Science Digital Library Under the National Institute of Science Communication and Information Resources, CSIR
- Regional coordinator, International Geological Correlation Programme (IGCP) Project 516 on the "Geological anatomy of East and South East Asia"
- Member, editorial board for Indian Journal of Geology
- Member, Working Group for Geology for the National Science Digital Library (NSDL) Under the National Institute of Science Communication and Information Resources, CSIR, New Delhi
- Member, editorial board for Earth, Environmental and Planetary Sciences
- Member, Expert Group for 'Electron Probe Micro-Analyzer (EPMA) National Facility at IIT Kharagpur' under the Science & Engineering Research Council, Department of Science & Technology, New Delhi
- Member, editorial board for Journal of Virtual Explorer, an electronic journal from Monash University, Australia. ISSN Number: 1441-8126 (Printed Journal); 1441-8142 (Online Journal) and 1441–8134 (CD-ROM Journal)
- Member, editorial board of the Journal of the Mineralogical Society of India
- Member, editorial board of the Gondwana Geological Magazine
- Member, editorial board of the Journal of the Geological Society of India
- Member, editorial board Of the Journal of Earth System Science
- Member, Expert Group for FIST North East, DST, New Delhi
- Member, Board of Research Studies for the Faculty of Sciences, Department of Geology and Geophysics, University of Kashmir

Academic offices
Preceded by Prof. Khurshid Iqbal Andrabi	Vice Chancellor of the University of Kashmir; 6 August 2018 – 20 May 2022	Succeeded by Nilofer Khan
