= Bidhyanath Pokhrel =

Nepalese poet and politician

- विद्यानाथ पोख्रेल
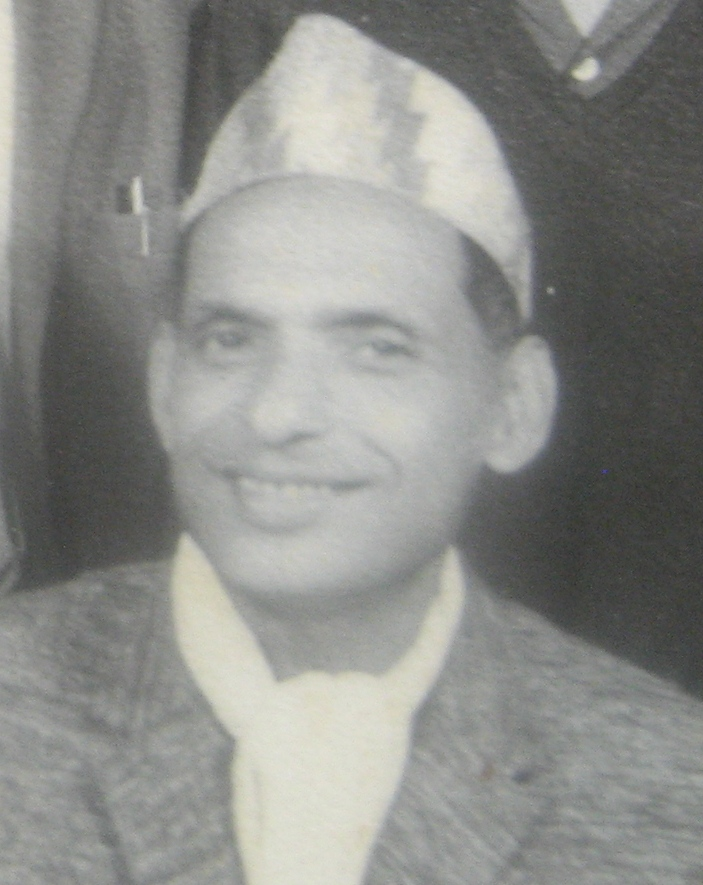
- Born: Bidhyanath Pokhrel; June 9, 1918; Kachide, Dhankuta, Nepal
- Died: 25 August 1994 (aged 76); Kathmandu, Nepal
- Citizenship: Nepali
- Occupations: poet, politician
- Spouse: Girija Kumari Pokhrel
- Children: four daughters, three sons
- Parent(s): Loknath Pokhrel (father), Renuka Pokhrel (mother)
- Relatives: Suman Pokhrel (grandson)
- Writing career
- Language: Nepali, Sanskrit, Hindi

Bidhyanath Pokhrel (Nepali: ne: विद्यानाथ पोख्रेल, 9 June 1918 – 25 August 1994) was a Nepali poet and politician. He was an anti-Rana democratic politician. He took charge of the Dhankuta Front during the 1951 democratic revolution of Nepal.

== Biography ==
Bidhyanath Pokhrel played a prominent role in the Nepali Congress party. He was given a ticket to compete in the Dhanua North constituency in the first parliamentary elections in 1959. He campaigned for his election, but suddenly the ticket was transferred to Lilanath Dahal. Without being discouraged by this setback, Bidhyanath Pokhrel bravely participated in the elections as an independent candidate, despite ultimately suffering defeat.

Recognizing his trapped situation and political skills, King Mahendra offered Bidhyanath Pokhrel a lifelong membership in the Raj Sabha, a body similar to the Privy Council in the United Kingdom. This offer came at a time when Pokhrel had not yet reconnected with the Nepali Congress. He had only two options: to confront the king or accept his proposal, as the Nepali Congress had not initiated talks to reintegrate rebel candidates into their party system. He advocated for the multi-party system option during the 1980 referendum. However, he remained without any position as the multi-party option was defeated in the referendum. Since then, he has been less active in politics.

Pokhrel died on 25 August 1994 in Kathmandu due to cardiac attack.
