= Alok Ranjan =

Indian politician (born 1956)

- आलोक रंजन
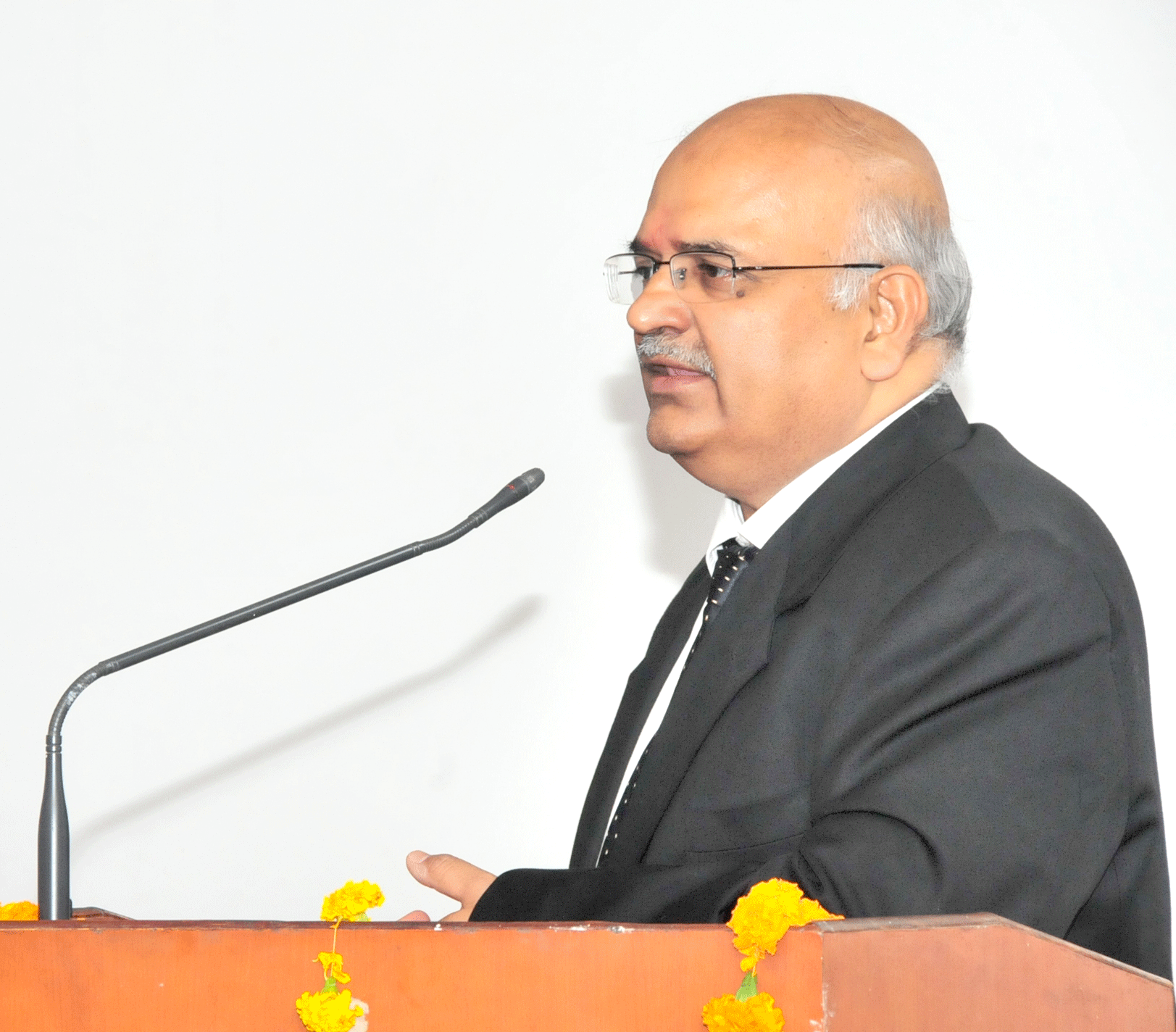

Chief Secretary of Uttar Pradesh
- In office June 2014 – 16 July 2016
- Preceded by: Jawed Usmani
- Succeeded by: Deepak Singhal

Chief Adviser to Chief Minister of Uttar Pradesh & Chairman, UPSIDC
- In office July 2016 – March 2017
- Preceded by: Office established
- Succeeded by: Office abolished

Personal details
- Born: 9 March 1956 (age 70) Unnao, Uttar Pradesh, India
- Spouse: Surabhi Ranjan
- Children: Shivam Ranjan and Shikhar Ranjan
- Education: MBA(PGDM, 2yr), IIM Ahemdabad; BA(Hon.) Economics, St. Stephen's College, Delhi University
- Occupation: Retired IAS Officer, Thought Leader, Speaker & Author.
- Website: ranjanalok.com

Alok Ranjan (born 9 March 1956) is a retired 1978 batch IAS officer from the U.P Cadre. He retired on 1 July 2016 after holding the office of Chief Secretary for the Government of Uttar Pradesh for over two years.

After retirement, he was appointed as the Chief Adviser to Chief Minister of U.P and Chairman U.P.S.I.D.C (Uttar Pradesh State Industrial Development Corporation). He resigned from this post following the defeat of the ruling Samajwadi Party government in the state assembly elections.
