= Ganesh Prasad Rijal =

Nepali politician

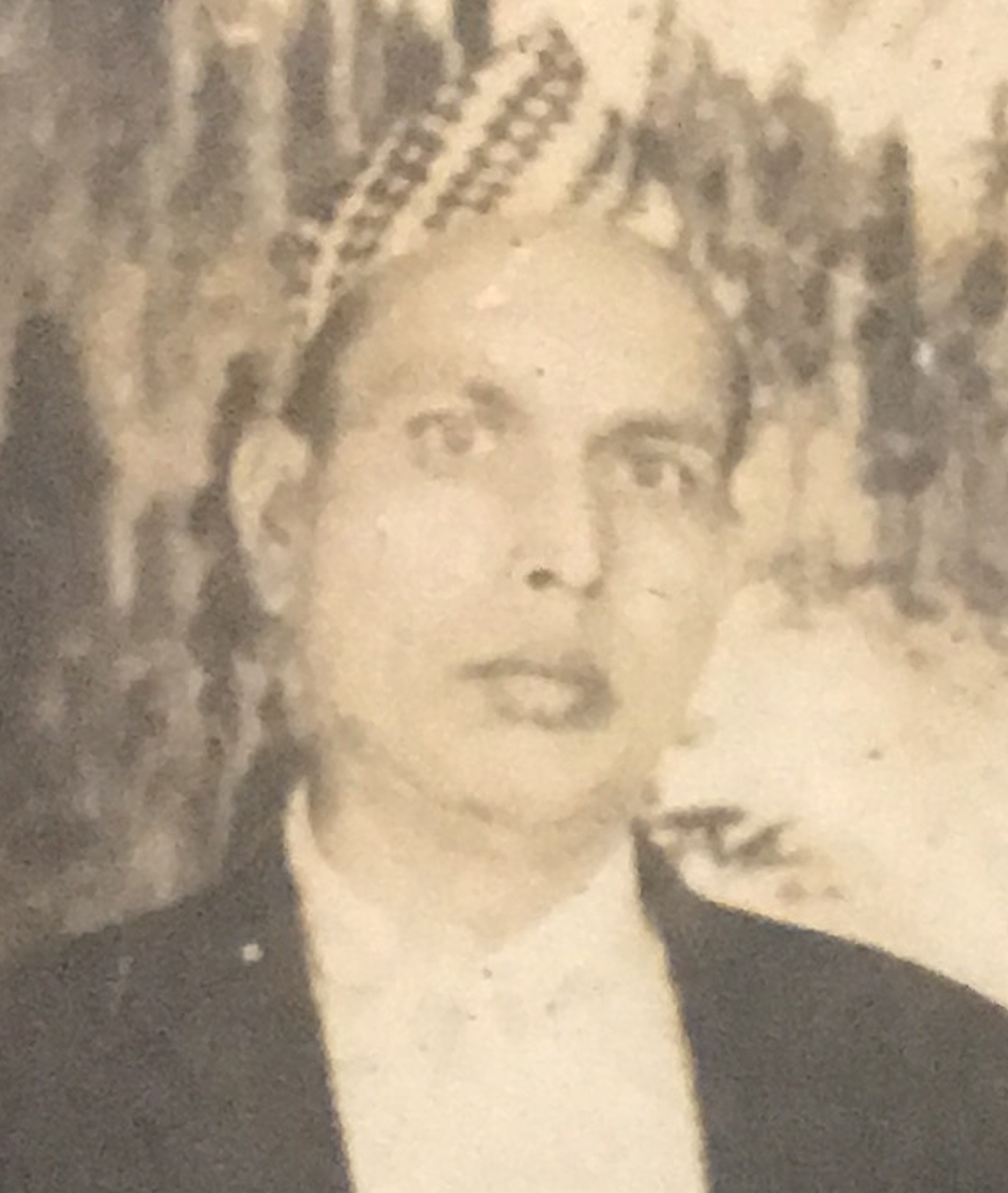
- 'Ganesh Prasad Rijal' (गणेशप्रसाद रिजाल), photo shot in very back old Nepali years

Member of Parliament of Nepal
- In office 27 May 1959 – 16 December 1960
- Prime Minister: Bishweshwar Prasad Koirala
- Constituency: Ilam West
- Monarch: King Mahendra

Personal details
- Born: 11 May 1920 Panchthar, Nepal
- Died: 4 April 1998 (aged 77) Damak, Nepal
- Citizenship: Nepali
- Party: Nepali Congress
- Spouse: Kamala Rizal
- Parent(s): Jayanarayan Rijal (father), Jalapa Rijal (mother)
- Relatives: Suman Pokhrel (grandson)
- Occupation: politician

Ganesh Prasad Rijal (Nepali: ne: गणेशप्रसाद रिजाल; 11 May 1920 – 4 April 1998) was a Nepali politician. He took part in the 1951 democratic revolution of Nepal and later in 1959, elected as a member of parliament from Ilam district. On 15 December 1960, King Mahendra suspended the constitution, dissolved the elected parliament, dismissed the cabinet, imposed direct rule and imprisoned the then prime minister Bishweshwar Prasad Koirala and his closest government colleagues. After King Mahendra's coup, Rijal was exiled to India along with other leaders and workers of Nepali Congress party. During his exile, he resided in Kalimpong and Naxalbari in Indian state of West Bengal. He returned homeland in 1975 following government granting amnesty, and continued his political career, residing in Damak and Kathmandu simultaneously.

Rijal died on 4 April 1998 in Damak in Jhapa district of Nepal due to cardiac arrest.

== See also ==
- History of Nepal
- Politics of Nepal
