= Daya Dissanayake =

Sri Lankan novelist and poet

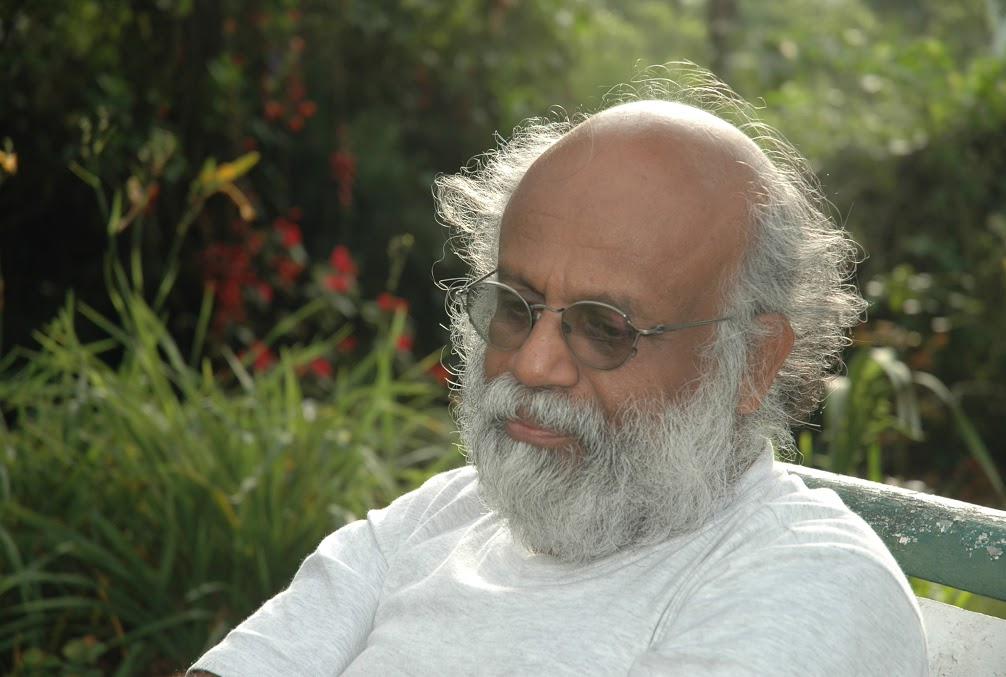
Daya Dissanayake Author and Poet

Daya Dissanayake (born 8 March 1947) is a bilingual Sri Lankan novelist, poet and blogger. His work spans a critical study of king Ashoka, nine novels in English, six novels in Sinhala and a collection of poems, and numerous articles in newspapers, journals and magazines. He is the author of the first e-novel in Asia, 'The Saadhu Testament' (1998), and the first e-novel in Sinhala, 'Vessan Novu Wedun' (2003). His first nonfiction work is "Who is Ashoka?" He is the only Sri Lankan writer to receive the Sri Lankan State Literary Award for the best English novel three times and was awarded the SAARC Literary Award in 2013. Being the first Sri Lankan to release his work online and for free access, he is often seen as one of Sri Lanka's earliest and most vocal advocates for the ebook format, copyleft and Creative Commons.

== Early life ==
Dayananda Dissanayake (he later shortened his name to Daya) was born on 8 March 1947 in Galle, Sri Lanka. He has five siblings and is the eldest offspring of Albert Dissanayake and Agnus Wavala Panditha. Daya first attended Southland Balika Vidyalaya, later joining St. Aloysius College, where he remained until after his G.C.E A/L examinations. Daya lost his father at the age of fourteen, and was largely raised by his mother and his father's younger brother, Mahinda Dissanayake; his mother wove cotton saris at home and his uncle supported them with his salary as a teacher, Galle.

Daya married Indrani Pathirana, of Mahamodara, Galle, who studied at the Sacred Heart Convent, Galle, which adjoined St. Aloysius' College. She started her career as an English teacher at Koggalla Vidyalaya, Ambalantota, in 1972. With their two children they lived in a house in Unawatuna until 1985, when he and his wife were both transferred to Colombo – he, to the Head Office of the Cement Corporation, his wife to the Curriculum Development Center, affiliated to the Ministry of Education (later renamed to the National Institute of Education). The family migrated to Colombo that year and now lives in Battaramulla, a suburb of Colombo.

== Corporate career ==
Daya Dissanayake's first job was as teacher of science at Sacred Heart Convent, Galle. He later joined the Sri Lanka Cement Corporation, in Kankesanthurai, Jaffna, as a trainee chemist in 1968. In 1970 he was transferred to Galle, and in 1983, he received a diploma in programming and systems design and was appointed as an Analyst Programmer at the Head Office of the Cement Corporation. When he was transferred from the Head Office in Colombo, to the cement factory in Puttalam, he resigned from his post at the Cement Corporation and joined a private company which dealt in manufacturing furniture. He later joined the Nawaloka Group of companies, first as the D.P. Manager at the Nawaloka Hospital, and then joined an associate company Nawakrama. He functioned as the Director/General Manager of several Nawaloka divisions (Ceyoka, Nawaloka Trading, and Koala). dealing in pharmaceuticals, medical equipment, vaccines, and also equipment for construction, power generation, welding, etc. He retired from the Nawaloka group in 2012 after serving for over twenty five years.

== Literary career ==
In his youth Daya Dissanayake contributed to the school magazine, and wrote articles for the Sinhala paper, Ada, popular at the time for fostering radical views. While in school he was more popular as a photographer than a writer; other than winning an award in a competition held by the British Council, Colombo when he was in his twenties, his creative activities in his youth were confined to typing numerous short stories on a battered typewriter – stories which remain unpublished - and are largely lost.

Daya started writing seriously in his forties. His writing often features the subjects of non-violence, history, archeology, Buddhism and how people perceive and adopt religion in their lives. His first novel was Kat bitha (1998) in which he narrates the story of Sigiriya through the musings of a young monk who visits the site in the 11th century. Kat bitha won the State Literary Award in 1998. His next book, The Saadhu Testament (1998) was published the same year and was heralded as the first Asian novel to be published in an electronic format. This was followed by the Healer and the Drug Pusher in 2000, as the first POD book from Sri Lanka and its Sinhala version, Vessan novu wedun (2003), which became the first e-book in Sinhala.

His other novels include, The Bastard Goddess (2003) and Thirst (2004). He launched Moonstone in English and Chandraratnage Bawanthara Charikawa in Sinhala in 2006. He was described by the Sunday Observer as one of the "Five Golden Authors" who shared the Swarna Pusthaka Award in 2006.

His next novel, Eavesdropper, which won the State Literary Award again, was published in 2007. The Sinhala version 'Asa Sitiya Ohu Mese'(2008). Miracle Under the Kumbuk Tree (2012) won the Sri Lankan National Award for the Best English Novel. the Sinhala version is 'Babli' (2011) The Clone, along with its Sinhala language counterpart, 'Kloniyakage Katha Vasthuwa' also came out in 2012.

"Daya Dissanayake's greatest virtue is that he sees Sri Lanka ‘steadily and sees it whole’ he writes well (though not in the narcissistic manner of Romesh Gunasekare) and gives us an evocative portrayal of a world we see daily but do not perceive – the rural underclass – a culture incredibly foreign to snug Colombian gatherings – perhaps dangerously so. Dissanayake's presentation of them, as of monks, evangelists and money makers is admirably unvarnished and knowledgeable," stated Regi Siriwardena, upon examination of Miracle Under the Kumbuk Tree.

his tenth novel is "Sacred Grove" 2024, published by Dhara Shree Radha Trust, Bhubaeshwar. It is a story narrated by an Ashvatte tree, transcribed by daya

The English novels are available on Kindle.

His first nonfiction work," Who was Ashoka? A critical study " was published in 2019 by Birdnest, Odisha.

Most of the papers presented by him are available at https://independent.academia.edu/dayadissanayake

In addition to his main body of work, Dissanayake also blogs on www.saadhu.com, has translated two books from Sinhala to English (Swayanjatha which was nominated for the State Literary Award for best translation in 2012 and 'Son of the Soil', the biography of H.K Dharmadasa). He has also published a collection of poems titled Inequality, which reviewers from the Sunday Observer noted for its experimental use of language. Prof. Sunanda Mahendra wrote a glowing review for the Daily News, stating that "Daya is, to all intents, a reformer of sorts. He hangs his thoughts on seething crosses and asks that we regard them with our conscience."

== Awards ==
Daya Dissanayake received the State Literary Award for the Best English novel for his debut novel Kat bitha in 1998. In 2007 he received the award once again for Evesdropper, and in 2013 for Miracle Under the Kumbuk Tree. In 2006 he shared the Swarna Pusthaka award with five others, and in 2013 he also won the same for the best Sinhala novel with four others for Chandrarathnage Bawanthara Charikawa. In the same year he received the SAARC Literary Award conferred by the Foundation of SAARC Writers and Literature.

Lifetime Achievement Award (International) 2024, Children's Literature Research Center, Agartala, India G.D.Harti Award 2025, International Society for Intercultural Studies and Research. Kolkata Golden Harp Award 2025 Dhara Shree Radha Trust, Odisha

== Advocacy ==
Daya Dissanayake is noted for his advocacy of the abolishing of copyright, considered by many to be an unusual viewpoint. He is vocal against what he describes as "the commodification of art" and has called for writers to place their works in the public domain, pointing out that with freedom of publication, writers "would write freely, for their own pleasure and satisfaction, and readers could read freely, of their own choice, without any control, or monitoring or censorship". He has also advocated against awards and competition schemes for novels, stating that award ceremonies should be called off as they create "unnecessary friction, suspicion and jealousy." He is regarded by many to be the first Sri Lankan advocate for electronic books and self-publishing.
