= Deepak Singhal =

Indian civil servant

Chairman of Uttar Pradesh State Vigilance Commission and Administrative Tribunal
- In office 15 September 2016 – 31 May 2024

Chief Secretary of Government of Uttar Pradesh
- In office 7 July 2016 – 13 September 2016
- Preceded by: Alok Ranjan
- Succeeded by: Rahul Bhatnagar

Personal details
- Born: Deepak Singhal; 25 May 1959 (age 66) Saharanpur, Uttar Pradesh
- Occupation: IAS Officer

Deepak Singhal is a retired 1982 batch IAS of Uttar Pradesh cadre. In September 2016 he was appointed as chairman of Uttar Pradesh Vigilance Commission and Administrative Tribunal and served the office till 31 May 2024. He was the Chief Secretary of Government of Uttar Pradesh from 7 July 2016 to 13 September 2016. He was replaced by Rahul Bhatnagar, the then Finance Commissioner & Principal Secretary (Finance, Institutional Finance and Sugar industries & Cane Development) and Addl. Resident Commissioner of Uttar Pradesh.

== Education ==
Deepak Singhal is a graduate in mechanical engineering (BTech), and a postgraduate in industrial engineering (MTech).

== Previous position held ==
Deepak Singhal has served in several key positions in both Union and Uttar Pradesh Governments, like as Chief Secretary of Uttar Pradesh, Principal Secretary (Irrigation), Principal Secretary (Home), Government of Uttar Pradesh, Chairman & Managing Director of Uttar Pradesh Power Corporation Limited (UPPCL), Commissioner of Meerut and Barielly divisions, District Magistrate and Collector of Meerut, Barielly and Nainitial districts.

He has also served as Joint Secretary in the Union Ministry of Chemicals and Fertilizers in the Union Government.
