= Rahul Bhatnagar =

Indian civil servant

Rahul Prasad Bhatnagar
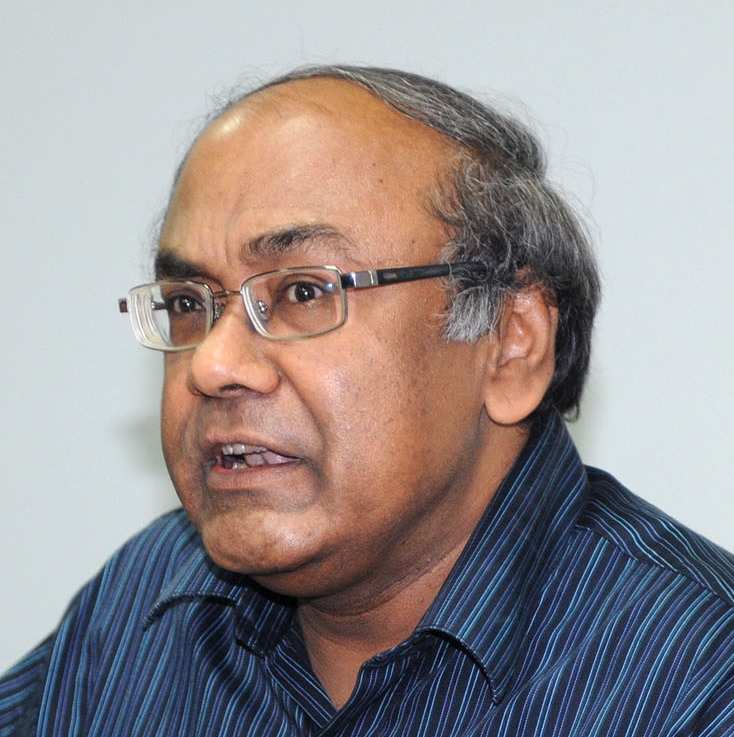

Sports Secretary of India
- In office 11 October 2017 – 30 September 2019
- Preceded by: Injeti Srinivas
- Succeeded by: Radheshyam Julaniya

Chairman of Greater NOIDA
- In office 29 June 2017 – 10 October 2017

Chief Secretary of Uttar Pradesh
- In office 13 September 2016 – 28 June 2017
- Preceded by: Deepak Singhal
- Succeeded by: Rajive Kumar

Personal details
- Born: Rahul C S 24 September 1959 (age 66) New Delhi, India
- Education: Delhi University
- Occupation: IAS officer

Rahul Prasad Bhatnagar is a retired 1983 batch IAS officer belonging to Uttar Pradesh cadre.

== Education ==
Rahul Bhatnagar has a graduate (BSc) and postgraduate (MSc) degrees in Physics. He also has a postgraduate degree in Economics (MA:Economics) and a MPhil degree all from Delhi University.

== Career ==
Rahul Bhatnagar has served in various key positions for both Uttar Pradesh and Union Governments, like as the Chief Secretary, Infrastructure and Industrial Development Commissioner and Principal Resident Commissioner of Uttar Pradesh, Chairman of Greater Noida and Investment Commissioner of Uttar Pradesh, Principal Secretary (Finance) and Finance Commissioner of Uttar Pradesh, Principal Secretary (Institutional Finance), Principal Secretary (Sugarcane) and Sugarcane Development Commissioner of Uttar Pradesh, District Magistrate and Collector of Gorakhpur and Shahjahanpur districts, Vice Chairman of Ayodhya-Faizabad Development Authority and as the Commissioner of Rural Housing in Uttar Pradesh Government, and as Joint Secretary in Ministry of Youth Affairs and Sports and Director in the Department of Economic Affairs of Ministry of Finance in the Union Government.

=== Chief Secretary of Uttar Pradesh ===
Rahul Bhatnagar was appointed the Chief Secretary, Infrastructure and Industrial Development Commissioner and Principal Resident Commissioner of Uttar Pradesh by the Chief Minister of Uttar Pradesh on 13 September 2016. He was transferred from office by Chief Minister of Uttar Pradesh on 28 June 2017.

=== Sports Secretary ===
Rahul Bhatnagar was appointed as the Union Sports Secretary and Director General of Sports Authority of India by the Appointments Committee of the Cabinet on 11 October 2017 and served the office till 30 September 2019.
