= Jawed Usmani =

Indian civil servant

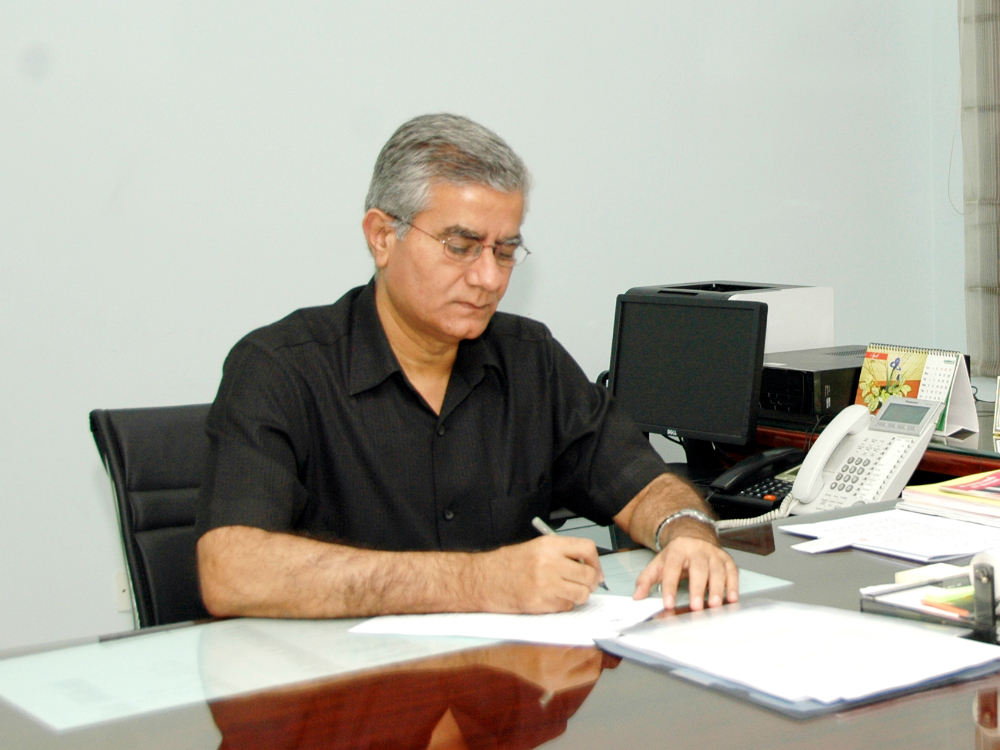

Chief Information Commissioner of Uttar Pradesh
- In office 17 February 2015 – 8 January 2021
- Preceded by: Ranjit Singh Pankaj
- Succeeded by: Bhavesh Kumar Singh

Chief Secretary to the Government of Uttar Pradesh
- In office 23 March 2012 – 31 May 2014
- Preceded by: Anoop Mishra
- Succeeded by: Alok Ranjan

Personal details
- Born: Jawed Usmani; 9 January 1956 (age 70) Allahabad, Uttar Pradesh
- Relations: Najma Akhtar (sister)
- Education: Aligarh Muslim University; Indian Institute of Management Ahmedabad; London School of Economics
- Occupation: Civil servant

Jawed Usmani (Hindi: जावेद उस्मानी; Urdu: جاوید عثمانی) is a retired IAS officer. He also served as the Chief Information Commissioner of Uttar Pradesh. He was the Chief Secretary to the Government of Uttar Pradesh from March 2012 to May 2014.

== Education ==
Usmani has an MBA from the Indian Institute of Management Ahmedabad and an MSc in Social Policy and Planning from the London School of Economics.

== Career ==
Usmani was an officer of the 1978 batch of the Indian Administrative Service (IAS) belonging to the Uttar Pradesh cadre. Prior to appointment as Chief Secretary of Uttar Pradesh, he worked in different capacities in the government of India, including as Joint Secretary to the Prime Minister. In the international arena, Usmani was Senior Advisor to the Executive Director at the World Bank in Washington, D.C. and Minister (Economic Cooperation) at the Embassy of India in Nepal.

Usmani's key assignments in the state government included Principal Secretary to the Chief Minister, Special Secretary to the Chief Minister, managing director and CEO of UP State Cement Corporation, and District Magistrate and Collector of Gorakhpur and Bulandshahr districts. After his removal from the post of Chief Secretary of Uttar Pradesh Government, Usmani served as the Chairman of Uttar Pradesh Board of Revenue.

Usmani took voluntary retirement (VRS) from the Indian Administrative Service in February 2015, and was subsequently appointed the Chief Information Commissioner of Uttar Pradesh and served there till January 2021.

== Bibliography ==
- Vachani, Sushil; Usmani, Jawed, eds. (2014). Adaptation To Climate Change in Asia. Edward Elgar Publishing. ISBN 9781781954720. Archived from the original on 11 January 2014.
