= Suman Pokhrel =

Poet

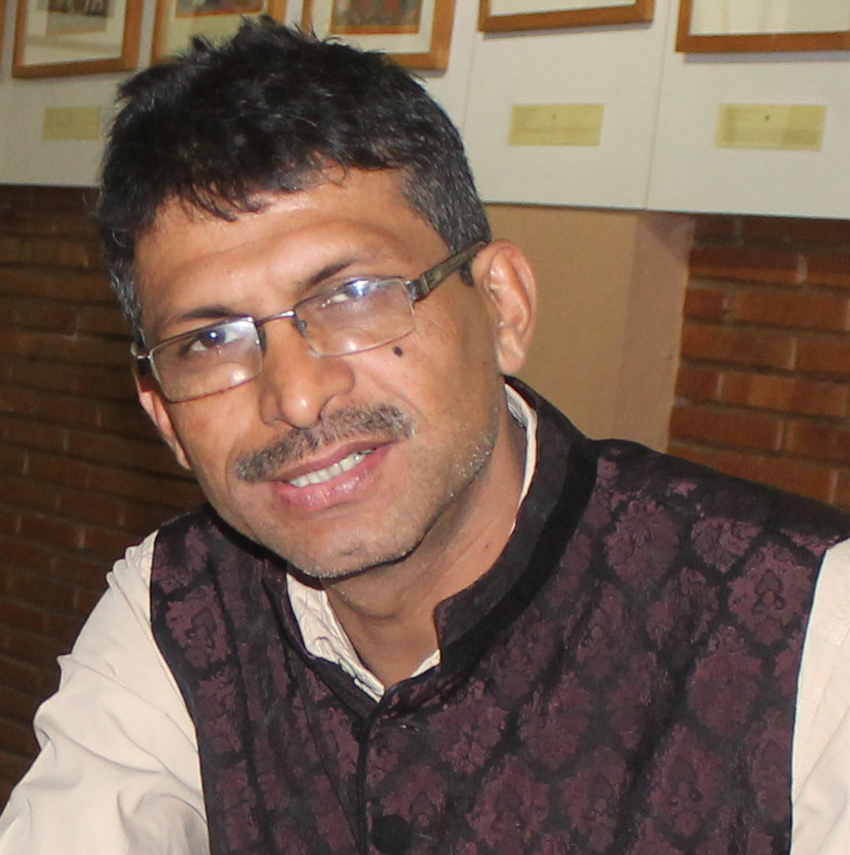
- Pokhrel in 2017 in New Delhi
- Born: 21 September 1967 (age 58); Mills Area, Biratnagar, Nepal
- Education: BSc, MBA, BL
- Occupations: Poet; lyricist; translator; artist
- Relatives: Bidhyanath Pokhrel (Paternal grandfather); Ganesh Prasad Rijal (Maternal grandfather)
- Writing career
- Notable works: Shoonya Mutuko Dhadkanbhitra; Jeevanko Chheubaata; Hazaar Aankhaa Yee Aankhaamaa; Yajnaseni
- Notable awards: Asia's Inspiring Poet Award (2023); Spillwords Author of the Month of June Award (2023); Shaluk International Literature Award (2023); SAARC Literary Award (2015); SAARC Literary Award (2013); Parikalpna Award (2012); Jayandra Best Book of the Year (2009)

Suman Pokhrel (Nepali: सुमन पोखरेल; born 21 September 1967) is a Nepali poet, lyricist, playwright, translator and artist. Universities in Nepal and India have included his poetry in their syllabi.

Pokhrel is the only writer to have received the SAARC Literary Award twice. He received this award in 2013 and 2015. He is recipient of several other national and international literary awards including Shaluk International Literature Award and Asia's Inspiring Poet Award.

== Early life ==
Pokhrel was born on 21 September 1967, in Mills Area, Biratnagar, to Mukunda Prasad Pokhrel and Bhakta Devi Pokhrel.

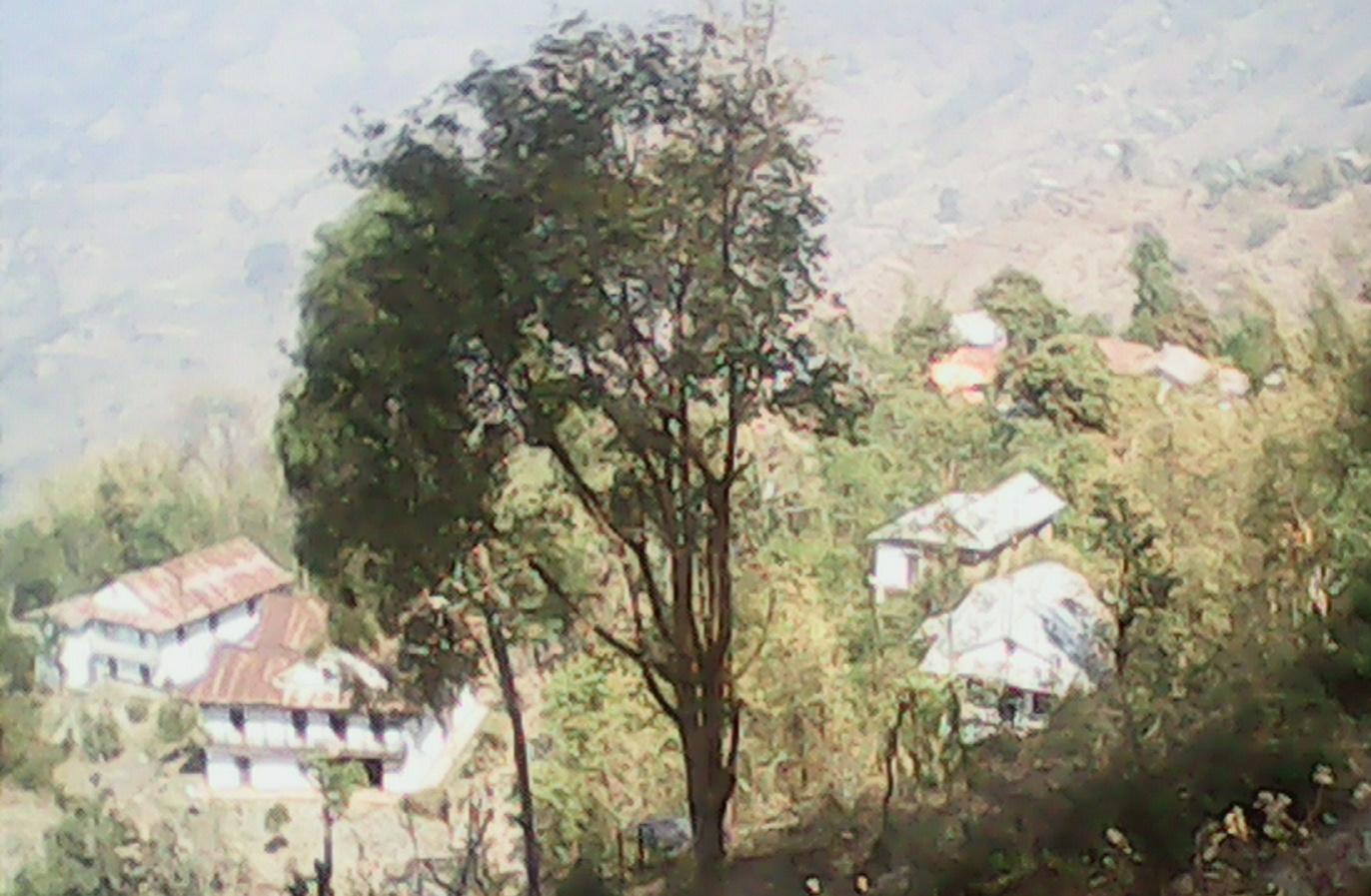
A view of Pokhrel's ancestral village Kachide

Pokhrel attended Bal Mandir, a government owned Kindergarten in Biratnagar, until he was five. Pokhrel got moved to his ancestral village of Kachide in Dhankuta at the age of seven and raised there by his paternal grandmother. His paternal grandfather Bidhyanath Pokhrel was a poet and a politician. He was introduced to literature early through the influence of his grandfather's library, filled with Nepali, Hindi and classic Sanskrit literature. At the age of twelve, he moved back to Biratnagar to live with his parents. Pokhrel was mentored by his father, who was an engineer by profession and a bibliophile with a keen interest in art and literature.

== Education ==
Pokhrel earned his BSc, MBA and BL from the Tribhuvan University, Nepal.

== Career ==
Pokhrel joined the Nepali civil service in Nepal Government as a Section Officer in February 1995. He left the job and joined Plan International in December 1998 as a development activist and went to the remote hilly region of the country. The job demanded visits to the more remote areas of the region.

A multilingual poet, Pokhrel has written in Nepali, English, Hindi and Urdu languages. Whereas, his works have been translated into several other languages, and are published in magazines and journals from across the countries. Many of his works have been translated into other languages by various translators including himself.

Pokhrel has read his poems for both national and international audiences. He has read his poems in SAARC Festivals of Literature in 2009, 2010, 2011, 2013 and 2015. He read his poem in SAARC Charter Day Celebrations on 8 December 2013, in New Delhi, India as an especial invitee. He recited his poems in Nepali during a monthly two-poet poetry recital program in Kathmandu in March 2015. He read his poems at the All India Poets' Meet in Orissa, India, in February 2016 as a specially invited poet from a foreign country. He further participated and read his poems at the First Forum of Asian Countries’ Writers in Nur-Sultan, Kazakhstan, in September 2019, Vishwa Rang in Bhopal, India, in November 2019, Kokrajhar Literature Festival in Assam, India, in January 2023, and Shaluk International Literature Festival in Dhaka, Bangladesh, in March 2023, as well as the BIMSTEC Literature Festival in March 2023 in New Delhi, India, among several other national and international literature events

== Works ==
Suman Pokhrel published his debut book, Shoonya Mutuko Dhadkanbhitra, a collection of poetry in Nepali language in 1999. Following this, he released Hazaar Aankhaa Yee Aankhaa Maa in 2003, and Jeevanko Chheubaata in 2009, which was reissued in 2018. In 2016, he published two more books, Soundaryako Sangeet and Malai Zindaginai Dukhdachha, comprising Ghazals and lyrics written by him, respectively.

Pokhrel recorded his song Aaaja Yo Andhyarole in 1999, and subsequently, he recorded several other songs including Dharti Aakash Bhanda Para, Timi ra Ma Ani Yo Madhumas, Na Ta Din Bhayo, Pagliyera Pokhiyun Jhain, and Kati Mitha Kati Nyana, among others in music composition of Bednidhi Poudel. Audio albums titled Bhitra Kahan Kahan and Yo Ke Bhayo? have been released in 2017 and 2019 respectively, featuring songs with lyrics written by him.

In 2016, Pokhrel wrote Yajnaseni, a play based on the Sanskrit epic The Mahabharata, which premiered in Irving, Dallas, TX, US.The Unheard Plea (2019) featured his lyrics, with music composed and vocals by Sudha Raghuraman and stage performed by Neha Mondal Chakravarty. The performance debuted in New York in 2018 and was later recorded.

Suman Pokhrel's poetry, translated into several languages by various translators, including himself for some languages, is featured in notable international anthologies, literary journals, and magazines. Translations of his poems are available in Arabic, Assamese, Bengali, English, French, Georgian, German, Hindi, Italian, Maithili, Odia, Persian, Russian, Sanskrit, Spanish, and Vietnamese, granting him a wider audience and recognition.

As a translator, Pokhrel has translated works of several writers from around the world into Nepali. He has translated William Shakespeare's play The Tempest into Nepali as Aandhibehari, which was published by Nepal Academy in 2018. His translations of poetry of Anna Akhmatova, Anna Swir, Allen Ginsberg, Delmira Agustini, Forough Farrokhzad, Gabriela Mistral, Jacques Prévert, Mahmoud Darwish, Nazik Al Malaika, Nazim Hikmet, Nizar Qabbani, Octavio Paz, Pablo Neruda, Yehuda Amichai. and Sylvia Plath, are collected in Manpareka Kehi Kavita, an anthology of poetry in Nepali translation. His translations of fifty one of Kannada Language poets including Kuvempu, G. S. Shivarudrappa, D. R. Bendre, V. K. Gokak, U. R. Ananthamurthy, Siddalingaiah, P. Lankesh, K. S. Nissar Ahmed, Chandrashekhar Patil, Baraguru Ramachandrappa, Doddarange Gowda, Chennaveera Kanavi, Sumatheendra R Nadig, H. S. Venkateshamurthy, Gopalakrishna Adiga, Allama Prabhu, Manu Baligar, S. R. Ekkundi and Jayant Kaikini are collected in anthology titled Shashwat Awaj. Other prominent poets that he has translated into Nepali include Faiz Ahmad Faiz, Sahir Ludhiyanvi, Atal Bihari Vajpayee, Langston Hughes, Maya Angelou, Gulzar and Uday Prakash among others. Ajit Cour, Indira Dangi, Sheema Kalbasi, Anamika, Azita Ghahreman and Hélène Cardona are other contemporary writers and poets whom he has translated into Nepali. Pokhrel's Nepali translations have been considered as among a few best literary translations brought into Nepali.

Pokhrel has translated works of many of Nepali-language poets and writers, including Laxmi Prasad Devkota, Gopal Prasad Rimal, Bhupi Sherchan, Ishwar Ballav, Abhi Subedi, Krishna Bhooshan Bal, Sanu Sharma, and Geeta Tripathee among other into English, Hindi and Urdu languages.

Additionally, from 2019 to 2022, Pokhrel directed the series Kavyaarohan in collaboration with Aarohan Gurukul, Biratnagar, which featured emininent Nepali poets like Bairagi Kainla and Tulasi Diwasa among other.

=== Poetry ===
- Shoonya Mutuko Dhadkanbhitra
- Hazaar Aankhaa Yee Aankhaamaa
- Jeevanko Chheubaata
- Malai Zindagi Nai Dukhdachha
- Soundryako Sangeet
- Itthamvidha Chitra : Itthamvidha Kavita

=== Play ===
- Yajnaseni

=== Translation ===
- Aandhibehari
- Manpareka Kehi Kavita
- One Zero One
- Bharat Shashwat Aawaz

== Recognition and acceptance ==
The appearance of Suman Pokhrel's poetry on international platforms granted him a wider audience and recognition. His poetry has garnered attention and admiration from people from all walks of life, with many citing and sharing his work. Additionally, his poetry is being included in university curricula, further solidifying his impact and influence in the literary world.

Suman Pokhrel's poetry has been part of university literary curricula across countries. His poems are included in syllabi of Tribhuvan University and Purbanchal University in Nepal and in University of Kerala, GD Goenka University, and Cauvery College For Women in India. His verses have left impact that admirers have tattooed them onto their bodies. Writers frequently cite his works in their writings, and his poetry is widely shared across social media platforms such as Instagram, Twitter, and Facebook.

In 2023, Suman Pokhrel was honored with the 'Asia's Inspiring Poet Award' by the Asia Award and the 'Shaluk International Literature Award' by the Shaluk Literary Magazine in Dhaka, Bangladesh. That same year, he was recognized as the 'Author of The Month' by Spillwords Press in New York, USA. Earlier, he was awarded the prestigious SAARC Literary Award in 2013 and again in 2015, making him the only person to receive this honor twice.

== Awards ==
=== International ===
- Asia's Inspiring Poet Award (2023)
- Spillwords Author of the Month of June Award (2023)
- Shaluk International Literature Award (2023)
- SAARC Literary Award 2015 – conferred by Foundation of SAARC Writers and Literature
- SAARC Literary Award 2013 – conferred by Foundation of SAARC Writers and Literature
- Parikalpana Award (2013)

=== National ===
- Bhanu Award (20220)
- Aarohan Poetry Award (2022)
- Babarsinha Thapa Memorial Award (2022)
- Sasidhdhi National Talent Award (2018)
- Person of the Year award from Youth for Blood (2015)
- Aarohan Bishesh Samman 2013 – conferred by Aarohan Gurukul

== Personal life ==
Suman Pokhrel belongs to an academic and politically active wealthy family within the Nepali context. Both his paternal and maternal grandfathers were politicians. His paternal grandfather, Bidhyanath Pokhrel, was also a poet. His maternal grandfather Ganesh Prasad Rijal was a member of the first parliament of Nepal, who was exiled to India after King Mahendra's coup in 1960. His father, Mukunda Prasad Pokhrel, was an engineer with international degrees and a government employee, while his mother, Bhakta Devi Pokhrel, was a BHU graduate and also a Nepal government employee.

Suman Pokhrel married Goma Dhungel in 2002. They have two children: a daughter, Ojaswee, and a son, Ajesh, also known as Mansoon. They live in their personal residence in Biratnagar.
