= Najma Akhtar =

Indian academic administrator

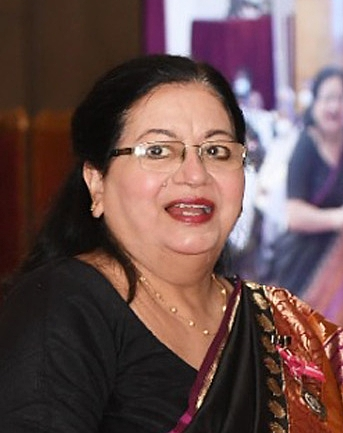
- Akhtar in 2022

15th Vice-Chancellor of Jamia Millia Islamia
- In office 12 April 2019 – 12 November 2023
- Chancellor: Najma Heptulla; Mufaddal Saifuddin
- Preceded by: Prof. Talat Ahmad
- Succeeded by: Mazhar Asif

Personal details
- Born: 13 November 1953 (age 72)
- Relations: Jawed Usmani (brother)
- Education: Aligarh Muslim University; Kurukshetra University
- Awards: Padma Shri

Najma Akhtar (born 1953) is an Indian academic administrator. She served as the Vice Chancellor of Jamia Millia Islamia from 12 April 2019 until 12 November 2023. She is also the first woman to hold the post in JMI. In 2022, she was awarded with Padma Shri by the Government of India.

== Education ==
Akhtar was born in 1953. She studied at Aligarh Muslim University, where she was a gold medalist and earned a National Science Talent Scholarship. She has a PhD in education from Kurukshetra University. She received a Commonwealth Fellowship to study University administration at the University of Warwick in the UK and also trained at the International Institute of Educational Planning at Paris (France).

== Career ==
Akhtar worked for fifteen years at the National Institute of Educational Planning and Administration, leading courses for senior officials from 130 countries. She established the first state-level management institute at Allahabad and was the Controller of Examination and Director of Academic Programs at Aligarh Muslim University. She has been a consultant to UNESCO, UNICEF and DANIDA.

In April 2019, the Ministry of Human Resource Development received approval from the President of India, Ram Nath Kovind, to appoint Akhtar as vice chancellor of Jamia Millia Islamia for a five-year term or till attaining the age of 70 whichever is earlier and served their till 12 November 2023. Muslim Rashtriya Manch recommended her name for the position. Akhtar has been an advocate for gender equity and is known for leading teams of diverse cultural backgrounds. She said her goal is to establish a medical college at Jamia during her tenure. Of her appointment as the first female vice chancellor in the university's 99-year history, she said, "My aim was not to break the glass ceiling but I was definitely against the glass ceiling. Why is it even there, if you hold the same educational qualifications and experience?"

She serves in the advisory board of Centre for Public Policy and Governance.

== Honours ==
In 2022, Akhtar was awarded with Padma Shri by the Government of India. On 19 January 2023, she was conferred with the honorary rank of Colonel and appointed "Colonel Commandant" of Jamia Millia Islamia.
