= Laxmi Chand Gupta =

Indian doctor and writer (1939–2010)

- Born: 10 July 1939; Gwalior, Gwalior State, British India
- Died: 27 May 2010 (aged 70); New Delhi, India
- Other name: Lakhau
- Occupations: Medical doctor Medical Writer
- Known for: Highest number of medical books in the world.(113 medical books). An artist par excellence. He had a one man show in London art gallery in 1961.
- Spouse: Dr Kusum gupta
- Children: Dr Abhitabh Gupta (CEO of good health TPA), Dr Sujata Sarabahi (Daughter in law, plastic surgeon & Author)Dr Abhishek Gupta (Director of nuclear medicine in Max healthcare, medical author of 17 books), Dr Priya Verma(Daughter in law, Pediatric Dentist and Author of 21 Books in Dentistry)
- Parent: B.K.Gupta
- Awards: Padma Shri; B. C. Roy Award; President’s Police Medal for distinguished service, president police medal for meritorious services IMA Life Time Achievement Award; SAARC Literary Award, author of millennium award

Laxmi Chand Gupta (10 July 1939 – 27 May 2010) was an Indian medical doctor, radiologist and writer, specialized in sports medicine. He was the medical director of Border Security Force and was a recipient of several honors including the SAARC Literary Award and the B. C. Roy Award, the highest Indian award in the medical category. The Government of India awarded him the fourth highest civilian honour of the Padma Shri, in 2010, for his contributions to medical science.

== Biography ==
Born on 10 July 1939 in Gwalior in the largest Indian state of Madhya Pradesh, Gupta graduated in medicine from Gajara Raja Medical College of Jiwaji University in 1966 and continued his studies to secure post graduate degrees (MD) in Radiology in 1968 and Social and Preventive Medicine in 1972. He joined the Border Security Force (BSF) in 1966 and worked there till his superannuation in 1997 as the director of medicine, holding the rank of an Inspector General; in between he also worked in Ahvaz, Iran from 1975 to 1980 as a radiologist.

Gupta was known as a specialist in sports medicine and was a member of the Indian Association of Sports Medicine (IASM). He was reported to have been a prolific writer with over 100 medical books to his credit and was mentioned as a world record holder for writing the most number of medical books in 2005 and 2009. Manual of First Aid: Management of General Injuries, Sports Injuries and Common Ailments, Miraculous Effects of Acupressure, Manual of Medical Emergencies, and How to Live with Hypertension and Heart Attack are some of his notable books. He also published several medical papers and served as a member of the advisory boards of Indian Medical Gazette and Current Medical Practice journal.

Gupta, a Fellow of the Academy of Medical Sciences (2006) and the holder of the degree of Doctor of Science (1996), was awarded the B. C. Roy Award, the highest Indian award in the medical category by the Indian Council of Medical Research in 1988. He was also a recipient of awards such as The President's Police Medal (1993), SSF Award of the Spiritual Science Research Foundation (1993), Lifetime Achievement Award of the Madhya Pradesh chapter of the Indian Medical Association (2002) and the SAARC Literary Award (2002). He was selected for the civilian honor of the Padma Bhushan by the Government of India in January 2010. A few months later, he died on 26 May 2010, at the age of 70.

== Selected bibliography ==
- L. C. Gupta, Abhitabh Gupta (1998). Radiological and Imaging Secrets. JPB. p. 312. ISBN 978-8171796113.
- A. K. Saxena, L. C. Gupta (2002). Miraculous Effects of Acupressure. Srishti Publishers. p. 291. ISBN 978-8187075684.
- L. C. Gupta (2003). Sex and Sensuality. Srishti Publishers. p. 307. ISBN 978-8187075998.
- L. C. Gupta (2004). What To Eat and What Not To Eat. Srishti Publishers. p. 264. ISBN 978-8188575251.
- L. C. Gupta, P. G. Raman (2005). Manual of Medical Emergencies. Jaypee Medical Publishers. p. 380. ISBN 978-8171798032.
- L. C. Gupta (2006). How to live with Male and Female Meanpose. Srishti Publishers. ISBN 978-8188575527.
- L. C. Gupta (2007). Manual of First Aid: Management of General Injuries, Sports Injuries and Common Ailments. Jaypee Brothers Medical Publisher. ISBN 978-8171793846.
- L. C. Gupta (2007). How to Live with Hypertension and Heart Attack. Srishti Publishers. p. 188. ISBN 978-8188575510.
- L. C. Gupta, U. C. Sahu (2007). Diagnostic Ultrasound. Srishti Publishers. p. 498. ISBN 978-8184480641.
- L. C. Gupta (2009). Pocket Nurse's Dictionary. Srishti Publishers. ISBN 978-8174734525.
- L. C. Gupta (2010). Radiology And Imaging For Students & Practitioners. Aitbs Publishers. ISBN 978-8174730923.
- L. C. Gupta (24 December 2023). Joy of Pregnency. Srishti Publishers. ISBN 978-8188575169.

== See also ==
- Sports medicine
