= Nilofer Khan =

Indian academic

Vice-chancellor of University of Kashmir
- Incumbent
- Assumed office 20 May 2022
- Chancellor: Manoj Sinha
- Preceded by: Talat Ahmad

Personal details
- Born: 1960 (age 65–66)

Nilofer Khan (born 1960) is an Indian academic and author who currently serves as the Vice-Chancellor of the University of Kashmir. She was appointed the first woman Vice-Chancellor of the University on 19 May 2022.

== Career ==
Nilofer Khan formerly served as the Dean Student Welfare at the University of Kashmir (KU). She was the first woman to hold this post at the university. The Tribune reported on 19 May 2022 that the academic had "almost 30 years of teaching experience". She also served as the dean of the University's College Development Council, and as the dean of the Faculty of Applied Science and Technology.

Khan was the director of the KU's Institute of Home Sciences and also served as the registrar of the varsity. At the KU, she has been a member of decision-making bodies including Academic Council, Finance Committee and the University Syndicate. She also chaired the Students’ Grievance Committee at the university and served as a co-presiding officer of Internal Compliance Committee of the Central University of Kashmir.

On Thursday, 19 May 2022, the Lieutenant Governor of Jammu and Kashmir, Manoj Sinha appointed Khan as the Vice-Chancellor of the University of Kashmir. She is the first woman to have been appointed to this post. At the time of her appointment, she was a professor in the university's department of Home Science. She took the charge on 20 May 2022 replacing Talat Ahmad.

According to a May 2022 report of Greater Kashmir, Khan visited several USA-based universities to examine their academic and examinations system during 2003. The report also mentions her to have had supervised more than twenty doctoral research scholars and nine MPhil researchers.

== Publications ==
Khan's works include:

- Growth & development of Kashmiri urban children (Naheed Vaida)
- Role of Kashmiri women in agriculture development & allied fields (co-authored with Nayeema Jabeen and Nasreen Jahan)
- She: impact of domestic violence on Kashmiri women (co-authored with Fatima Buchh and Naheed Vaida)
