= Sitakant Mahapatra =

Indian poet and literary critic (born 1937)

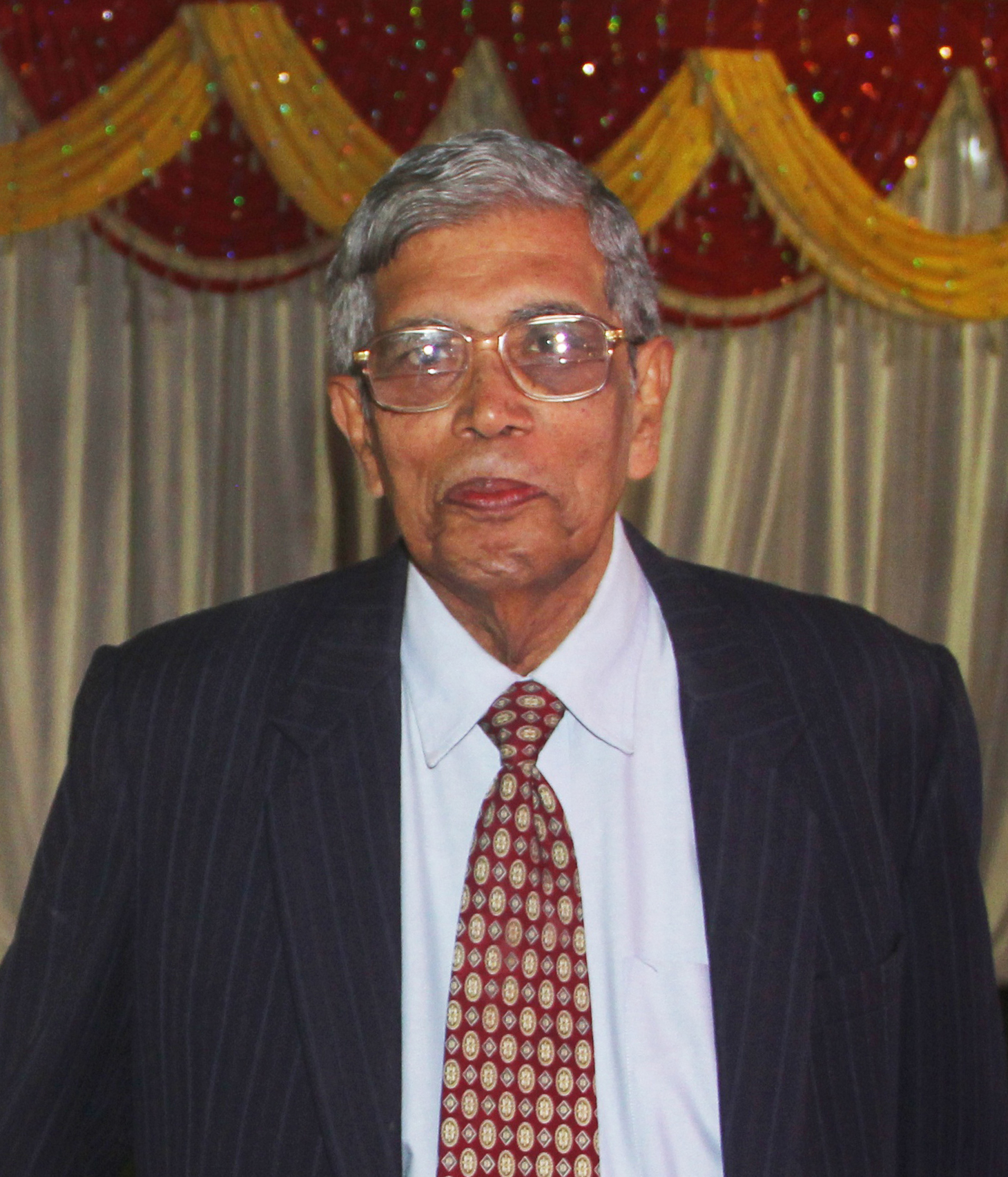
- Mahapatra in 2015
- Born: 17 September 1937 (age 89); Korua, Cuttack (now in Kendrapara)
- Occupations: Poet, literary critic
- Notable work: Sabdara Akasha (The Sky of Words) (1971); Samudra (1977)
- Awards: Sahitya Akademi Award (1974); Jnanpith Award (1993); Padma Bhushan (2002); Padma Vibhushan (2011); SAARC Literary Award (2015)

Sitakant Mahapatra (born 17 September 1937) is an Indian poet and literary critic in Odia as well as English. He served in the Indian Administrative Service (IAS) from 1961 until he retired in 1995, and has since held ex officio posts such as Banking Ombudsman of Odisha and Chairman of National Book Trust, New Delhi etc.

He has published over 15 poetry collection, 5 essay collections, a travelogue, over 30 contemplative works, apart from numerous translations. His poetry collection has been published in several Indian languages. His notable works are, Sabdar Akash (1971) (The Sky of Words), Samudra (1977) and Anek Sharat (1981).

He was awarded the 1974 Sahitya Akademi Award in Odia for his poetry collection, Sabdara Akasha (The Sky of Words). He was awarded the Jnanpith Award in 1993 "for outstanding contribution to Indian literature" and in its citation the Bharatiya Jnanpith noted, "Deeply steeped in western literature his pen has the rare rapturous fragrance of native soil"; he was also awarded the Padma Bhushan in 2002 and Padma Vibhushan in 2011 for literature apart from winning the Soviet Land Nehru Award, Kabeer Samman and several other prestigious awards.

== Early life and education ==
Born in 1937 in village Korua, Cuttack (now Kendrapara), situated on the banks of Chitrotpala, a tributary of the great Mahanadi, Sitakant Mahapatra grew up reciting a chapter of Odia version of Bhagwad Gita in a traditional household. After his schooling from Korua government high school, he chose to join Ravenshaw College, Cuttack (then affiliated with Utkal University), where he did his B.A. in History Honours in 1957. He went on to complete a master's degree in Political Science from Allahabad University in 1959. During that time, he was the editor of the university journal. It was here that he started writing both in English and Odia, though later he decided to write poetry solely in his native language. His scholastic works, however, are in English.

In 1969, he completed a diploma course in Overseas Development Studies at Cambridge University, under the Colombo Plan Fellowship.

Subsequently, in 1988 he spent a year at Harvard University as a participant in the Ford Foundation fellowship program.

== Career ==
He took to teaching for two years at Post-Graduate Department of Utkal University, before taking the Indian Administrative Services (IAS) examination.

He joined the IAS in 1961 as the first Odia to stand first in India in the UPSC examination, and went on to hold several key posts, including Home Secretary, Government of Orissa, Secretary, Ministry of Culture, Government of India, and President, UNESCO's World Decade for Cultural Development (1994–1996). He has held many other ex officio positions including those of Senior Fellow of Harvard University; Honorary Fellow of International Academy of Poets, Cambridge University, and Chairman of the National Book Trust, New Delhi. He was also the first ever Banking Ombudsman for Odisha. He is the recipient of many awards including the Orissa Sahitya Academy Award, 1971 and 1984; Sahitya Akademi Award, 1974; Sarala Award, 1985; culminating in India's highest literary honour the Jnanpith Award in 1993.

His first collection of poetry in Odia, Dipti O Dyuti was published in 1963, his second anthology, Ashtapadi came out in 1967, and won him the Odisha Sahitya Academy award, while his third and most celebrated anthology, Sara Akash (1971), got him the Sahitya Akademi Award, given by Sahitya Akademi, India's National Academy of Letters. Since then he has published over 350 poems in Odia and about 30 publications in English on literary criticism and culture. He spent two years studying tribals of Eastern India on a Homi Bhabha Fellowship (1975–1977). He has also two books on social anthropology published by the Oxford University Press, these books deal with the ambivalent relationship between the old ritual based society and state-sponsored development, and explores the reason behind developmental programs failing in tribal areas despite state efforts. Close ties with the tribals, and his fluency with the Santal tribal culture and the Santali language has led to the publication of nine anthologies of oral poetry of the tribals, which he not only collected, but also translated.

Among notable works are: Ashtapadi, 1963, Shabdara akasha, 1971, Ara drushya, 1981, Shrestha kavita, 1994, (all poetry); Sabda, Svapna O nirvikata, 1990 (essays), Aneka sarata, 1981 (travelogue); Ushavilasa, 1996 (palm leaf manuscript); In English: The ruined Temple and other poems, 1996 (poetry, translation); and Unending Rhythms (Oral poetry of Indian Tribals in translation).

In 1974, lyricist and writer Prafulla Kar described the works of Mahapatra as part of the "new poetry" in Odisha expressing a "contemporary consciousness" of Odia culture amidst an increasingly "urbanized and technological environment." According to Kar, Mahapatra addresses philosophical problems of human existence with an "awakening of a new kind of spiritual identification with the past" in search of "new values" with which to make sense of a "chaotic existence."

He had contributed his efforts and endeavors for the nation & state through his literary mission. Kalinga Literary Festival was inaugurated by him on 24 February 2014 and he was the chief guest and key speaker of the festival. This besides he has been key speaker to the Kerala Literary Festival as well.

== Awards and recognition ==
1. Orissa Sahitya Academy Award - 1971 and 1984
2. Sahitya Akademi Award - 1974
3. Sarala Award - 1985
4. Jnanpith Award, India's highest literary honour - 1993
5. Padma Bhushan (the third highest civilian award of India)- 2003
6. Padma Vibhushan (the second highest civilian award of India) - 2010
7. Sahitya Akademi Fellow - 2013
8. SAARC Literary Award - 2015
9. Tagore Peace Award - 2017

== Bibliography ==
- Quiet violence. Writers Workshop, Kolkata 1970. ISBN 0-89253-605-5.
- The Empty distance carries ...: Oraon & Mundari tribal songs transcreated, with an introduction by Edward Tuite Dalton. Writers Workshop, Kolkata 1972.
- The other silence, Writers Workshop, Kolkata 1973.
- The Wooden Sword, Utkala Sahitya Bikash, 1973.
- Old man in Summer and other poems, United Writers, 1975.
- Staying is nowhere: an anthology of Kondh and Paraja poetry, Ind-U. S. Incorporated, 1976.
- The Curve of meaning: studies in Oriya literature, Image Publications, 1978.
- Barefoot into reality, United Writers, 1978.
- Forgive the words: the poetry in the life of the Kondhs in Orissa, United Writers, 1978.
- Bākhen: Ritual invocation songs of a primitive community, Prachi Prakashan, 1979.
- The Jester and other poems, Writers Workshop, Kolkata 1979.
- Gestures of intimacy. United Writers, 1979.
- The song of Kubja and other poems, Samkaleen Prakashan, 1980.
- Men, patterns of dust, Bookland International, 1981.
- Bhima Bhoi (Makers of Indian literature), Sahitya Akademi, 1983.
- Primitive Poetry as Love and Prayer, Prasārānga, University of Mysore, 1983.
- The Awakened Wind: the Oral Poetry of the Indian Tribes, Vikas, 1983. ISBN 0-7069-2153-4.
- An Anthology of Modern Oriya poetry, Vikas Publishing House, 1984. ISBN 978-0-7069-2583-8.
- Selected poems, Prachi Prakashan, 1986.
- Modernization and Ritual: Identity and Change in Santal society, Oxford University Press, 1986.
- Tradition and the Modern Artist, Sterling Publishers, 1987.
- Jagannatha Das (Makers of Indian literature), Sahitya Akademi, 1989.
- Tribal Wall Paintings of Orissa, Orissa Lalit Kala Akademi, 1991.
- Death of Krishna and other poems, Rupa & Co., 1992. ISBN 8171670741.
- Reaching the Other Shore: the world of Gopinath Mohanty's fiction, B.R. Pub. Corp., 1992. ISBN 81-7018-746-X.
- Unending rhythms: Oral Poetry of the Indian Tribes, Inter-India Publications, 1992. ISBN 812100277X.
- The Realm of the Sacred: Verbal Symbolism and Ritual Structures, Oxford University Press, 1992.
- The Tangled Web: Tribal Life and Culture of Orissa, Orissa Sahitya Academy, 1993.
- Discovering the Inscape: Essays in Literature, B.R. Pub. Corp., 1993. ISBN 81-7018-768-0.
- Beyond the word: the multiple gestures of tradition. Motilal Banarsidass Publ., 1993. ISBN 81-208-1108-9.
- The Ruined Temple and other poems. Harper Collins Publishers India, 1996. ISBN 81-7223-222-5.
- The Sky of words and other poems. Sahitya Akademi, 1996. ISBN 81-7201-816-9.
- The Role of Tradition in Literature, Vikas Pub. House, 1997. ISBN 8125902465.
- A child even in arms of stone. Sahitya Akademi, 2000. ISBN 81-260-0769-9.
- Beyond Narcissism and other essays, UBS Publishers', 2001. ISBN 8174763643.
- Let Your Journey be Long, Rupa and Co., 2001. ISBN 81-7167-520-4.
- They sing Life: Anthology of Oral Poetry of the Primitive Tribes of India, UNESCO. Inter-India Publications, 2002. ISBN 81-210-0407-1.
- The Alphabet of Birds: Hymns for the Lord of the Blue Mountain, National Book Trust, 2003. ISBN 81-237-4098-0.
- Anek sharat: (travelogue). Bhartiya Jnanpith, 2003. ISBN 8126309431.
- A Screen from Sadness, Current Books, 2004. ISBN 812401390X.
- The Rainbow of Rhythms: Folk Art Tradition of Orissa, Prafulla, 2005. ISBN 81-901589-8-8.
- Ethnicity and the State: Raghunath Murmu and emergence of Jharkhand, UBS Publishers', 2008. ISBN 8174766138.
- Memories Of Time : Selected Poems. Pratiksha Publishers', 2011. ISBN 978-0-557-66656-0.
- Till My Time Come: Twenty Poems from SAMUDRA (Odia). Translated by Prabhat Nalini Das. Lekhalekhi Publishers, Bhubaneswar, 2018. ISBN 978-81-931588-9-0

== See also ==
- Famous Odia Writers & Poets
- List of Sahitya Akademi Award winners for Odia
- Jnanpith Award
- Odia poetry
