= Kharelthok =

Kharelthok खरेलथोक
- Village development committee
- Location in Nepal
- Coordinates: 27°36′36″N 85°40′48″E
- Country: Nepal
- Zone: Bagmati Zone
- District: Kabhrepalanchok District

Population (1991)
  - Total: 2,779
- Time zone: UTC+5:45 (Nepal Time)

Kharelthok is a village development committee in Kabhrepalanchok District in the Bagmati Zone of central Nepal. At the time of the 1991 Nepal census it had a population of 2,779 in 531 individual households.
