= Riyaz Punjabi =

Indian academic (1947–2021)

Riyaz Punjabi (12 October 1947 – 8 April 2021) was a professor and vice chancellor at the University of Kashmir. He was granted the Padma Shri, one of India's highest civilian awards, in 2011. In 2008 he was granted an honorary professorship at the International University Vienna for his contribution in "Strengthening International Relations in the Sphere of Education". He also won the Amity Academic Excellence Award from Amity International Business School, in 2009, the Fazil Memorial Award in 2009, and the Adbi Markaz Kamraz award in 2010. He died on 8 April 2021.

== Positions held ==
Riyaz Punjabi lectured in the universities and research institutions in different parts of Asia, Europe, Africa, Canada and Australia. He participated in more than 21 international conferences and seminars in U.S., U.K., Switzerland, the Netherlands, Canada, Australia, China, Turkey, South Africa, Croatia, Bangladesh, Kenya, Jerusalem, and New Delhi. Prof. Punjabi held a degree of Doctorate in Laws and taught and conducted researches in Jawaharlal Nehru University (JNU) New Delhi, Universities of Jammu and Kashmir, Jamia Millia Islamia, New Delhi and Indian Institute of Advanced Study, Shimla. He held the positions of professor, Centre for the Study of Social Systems, Faculty of Social Science Jawaharlal Nehru University, New Delhi; professor and chairman, Department of Distance Education, dean, Faculty of Non Formal Education, University of Kashmir; director, Directorate of Correspondence Courses, director, Centre for Adult Continuing & Extension Education and director, State Resource Centre, University of Kashmir. He was the director, Institute of Kashmir Studies, University of Kashmir.

Punjabi was a visiting research fellow on human rights in the Indian Institute of Advanced Study, Shimla, visiting professor, Academy of Third World Studies, Jamia Milia Islamia, New Delhi and visiting research fellow in the Centre for South Asian Studies, Switzerland. He was affiliated with research centres at the National level as a member, board of management, Nelson Mandela Centre for Peace and Conflict Resolution, Jamia Millia Islamia, New Delhi; member, advisory board, Centre for Peace and Conflict Management, Lady Shri Ram College for Women, University of Delhi; member, governing council of International Centre for Peace Studies, New Delhi.

Punjabi was president, International Centre for Peace Studies, New Delhi and honorary co-director, European Institute, New Delhi. He was the founding editor of the quarterly Journal of Peace Studies, New Delhi, since 1994.

== Academic and research contributions ==
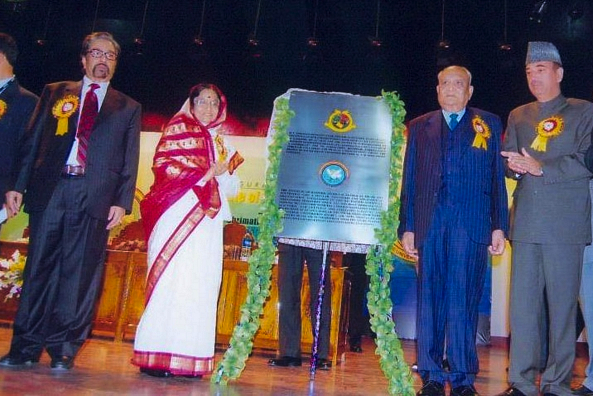
Prof. Punjabi with the President of India at the University of Kashmir

Riyaz Punjabi authored six books, contributed chapters in 12 edited volumes, and authored more than 20 occasional papers and monographs on diverse themes and subjects. He contributed more than 200 research papers in national and international journals on diverse themes and subjects. He wrote on various topics, but his main areas of work were peace studies, human rights, global terrorism, composite culture, inter-religious conflicts and rise of fundamentalism in South Asia and Sufism. His favourite subject was the projection of spiritual and cultural unity of people in South Asia as reflected in Sufi-Bakhti traditions of the region. In his latest edited book U.S.A. and Muslim World, Punjabi described the global Islamist movements and projected their declining fortunes.

In 1994, Punjabi set up a voluntary research group called the Centre for Peace Studies in New Delhi to encourage researches and debate on human rights, peace, spiritual unity and human brotherhood. This group later became the International Centre for Peace Studies and sustains itself on voluntary contributions and donations. This centre has facilitated disseminating Punjabi's publications, organizing public lectures, discussions and debates to promote the cause of human rights, peace and religious harmony and inter faith dialogue.

== Contributions to Kashmir studies ==
Riyaz Punjabi wrote extensively in the field of Kashmir studies. Through his publications, public lectures and discussions he projected the syncretic culture of Kashmir Valley. He described the spiritual continuity of different faiths in Kashmir which culminated in the form of Kashmiriyat in Kashmir. His article "Kashmiriyat: The Mystique of an Ethnicity" published in the India International Centre quarterly in 1990 was translated in several Indian languages and reproduced in several national and international publications.

He also authored several articles on Sikh faith. He worked on the spiritual content of Guru Granth Sahib – the Sikh Book of faith.

Academic offices
Preceded by Prof. Abdul Wahid Quraishi	Vice Chancellor of the University of Kashmir; 1 January 2008 – 1 June 2011	Succeeded by Prof. Talat Ahmad
