= Foundation of SAARC Writers and Literature =

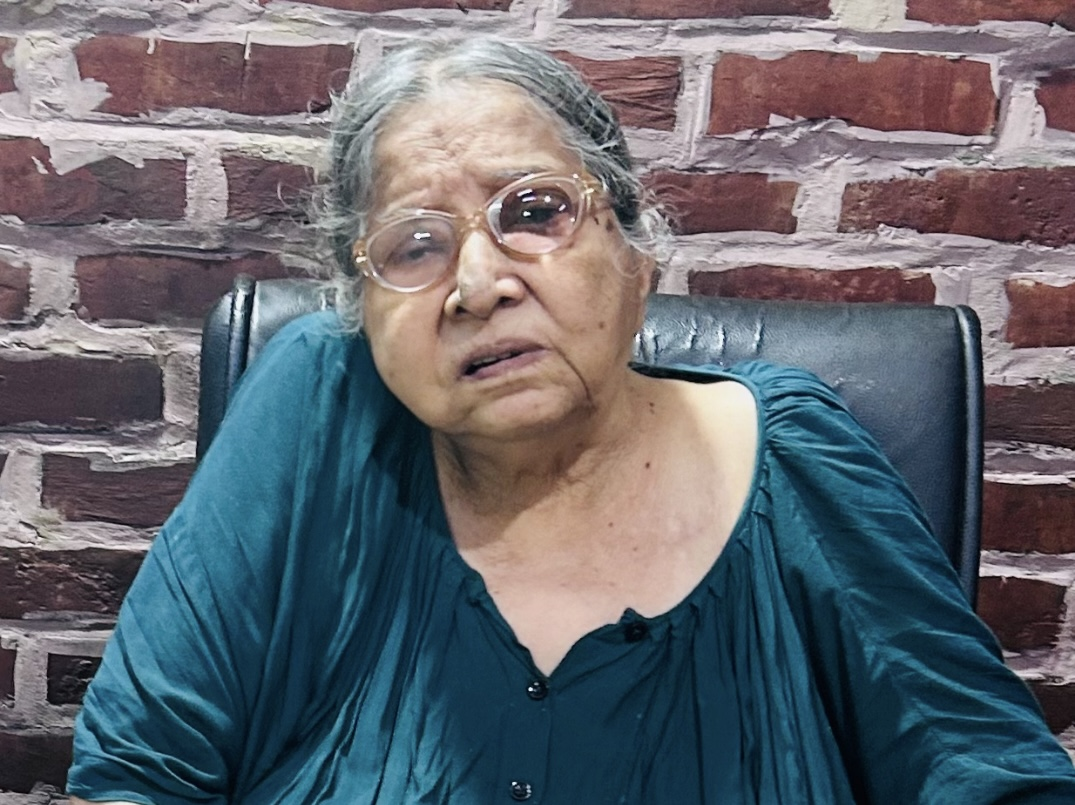
- Ajit Cour President FOSWAL
- Abbreviation: FOSWAL
- Formation: 1987
- Type: Regional Alliance
- Purpose: to project, nurture and strengthen cultural connectivity through literary and cultural interactions among the SAARC countries, for peace and tranquility in the region, through people-to-people contacts and dialogue.
- Headquarters: New Delhi
- Region served: South Asia
- President: Ajit Cour
- Parent organization: SAARC
- Affiliations: SAARC APEX BODY
- Website: foundationsaarcwriters.com

The Foundation of SAARC Writers and Literature (FOSWAL) is the only SAARC apex body in the SAARC region, working under the SAARC banner, projecting, nurturing and strengthening cultural connectivity through literary and cultural interactions among the SAARC countries, for peace and tranquility in the region, through people-to-people contacts and dialogue.

== History ==
FOSWAL launched its vision of cultural bonding among the neighboring SAARC countries in 1987, and emerged as the first and the only non government organization working in the specific area of culture, for creating cultural connectivity through a think tank of intellectuals and writers, creative fraternity and peace activities, who have common sensitivities and common concerns for the socio-cultural-political-economic-tribal-gender issues of the region.

FOSWAL organises variety of art, literature and culture related festivals ensuring participations of eminent writers and scholars from across South Asian region.

== Gallery ==
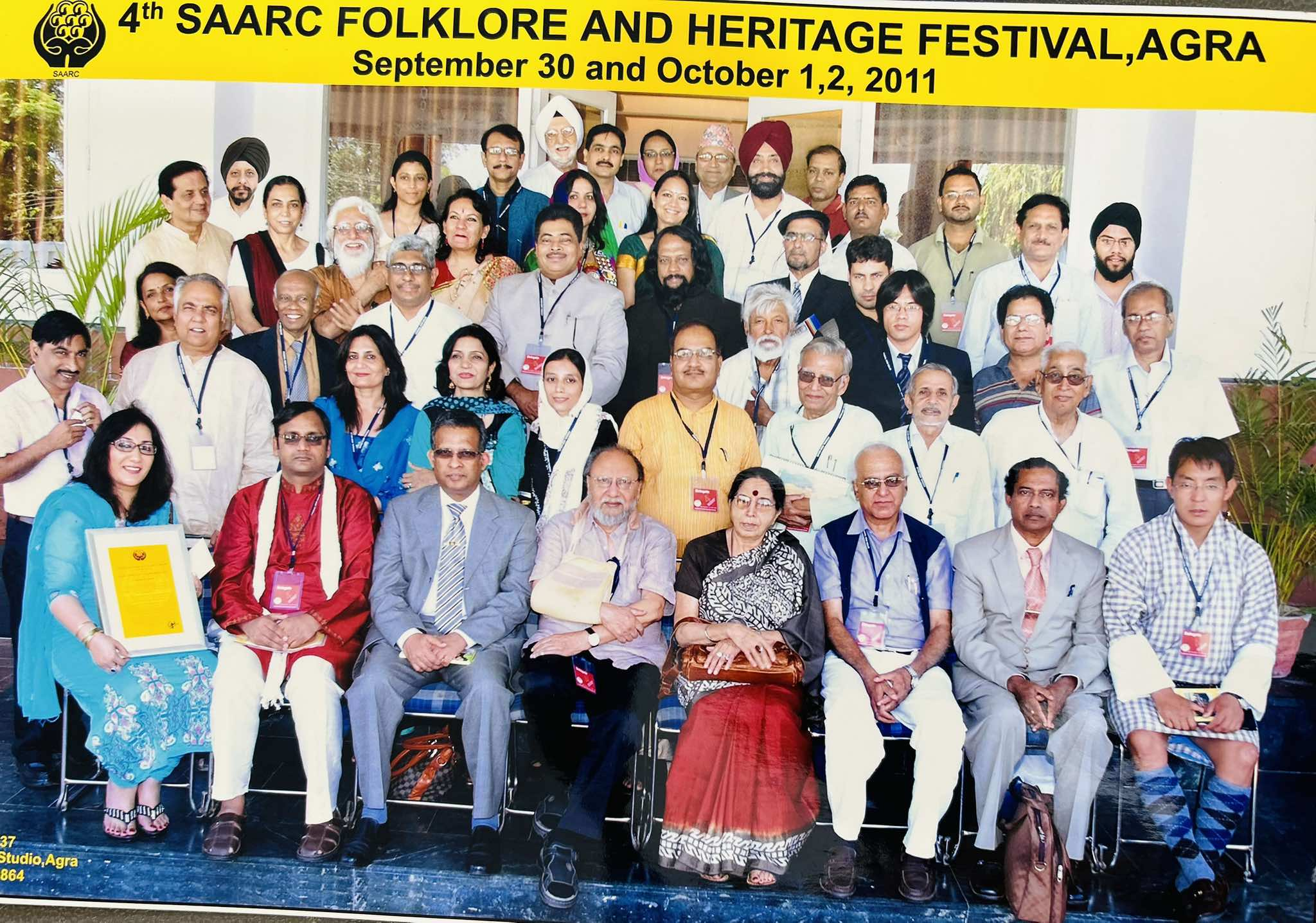
Delegates of 4th SAARC Writers conference held at Agra -2011

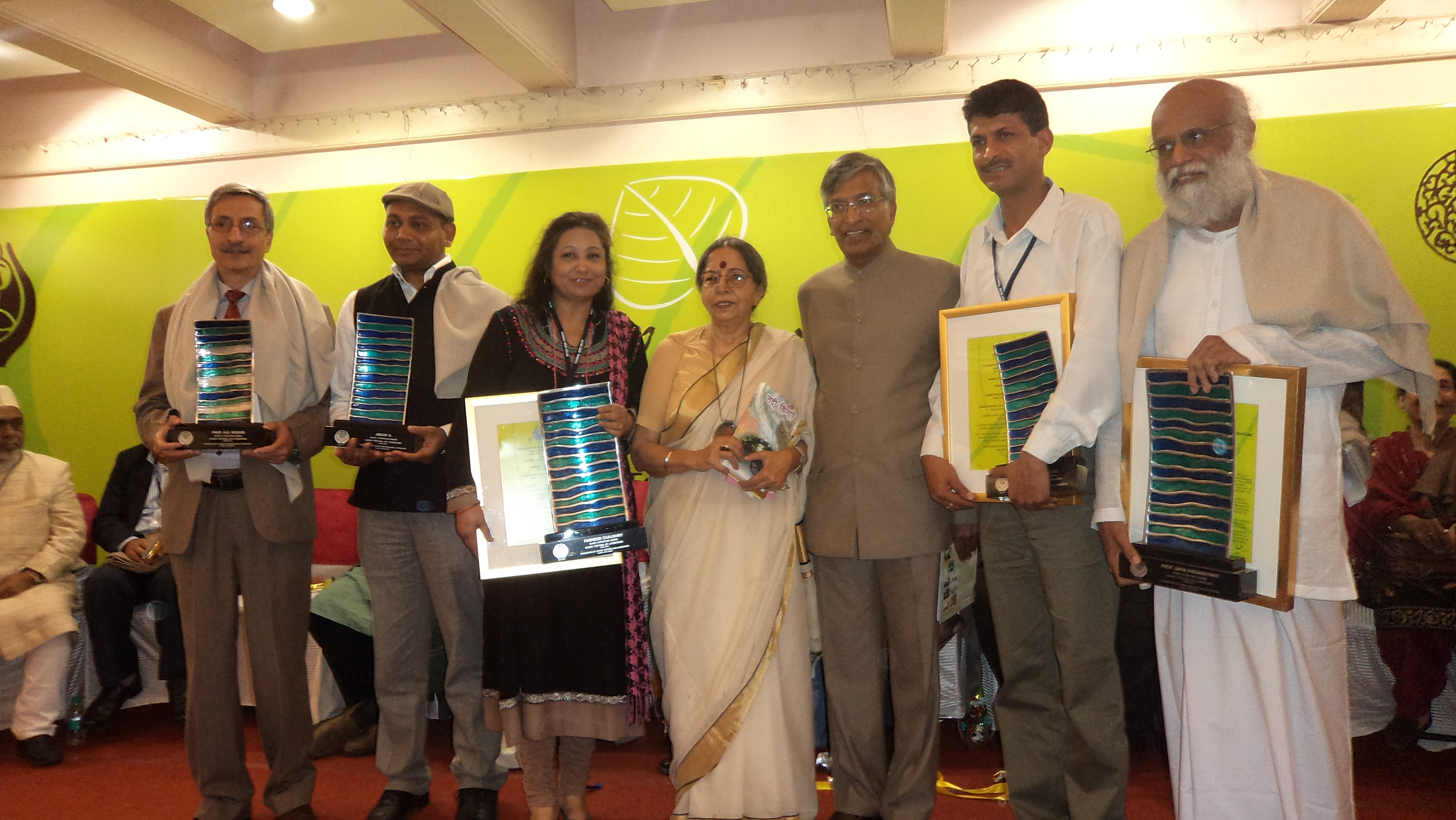
Recipants of SAARC Literary Award 2013

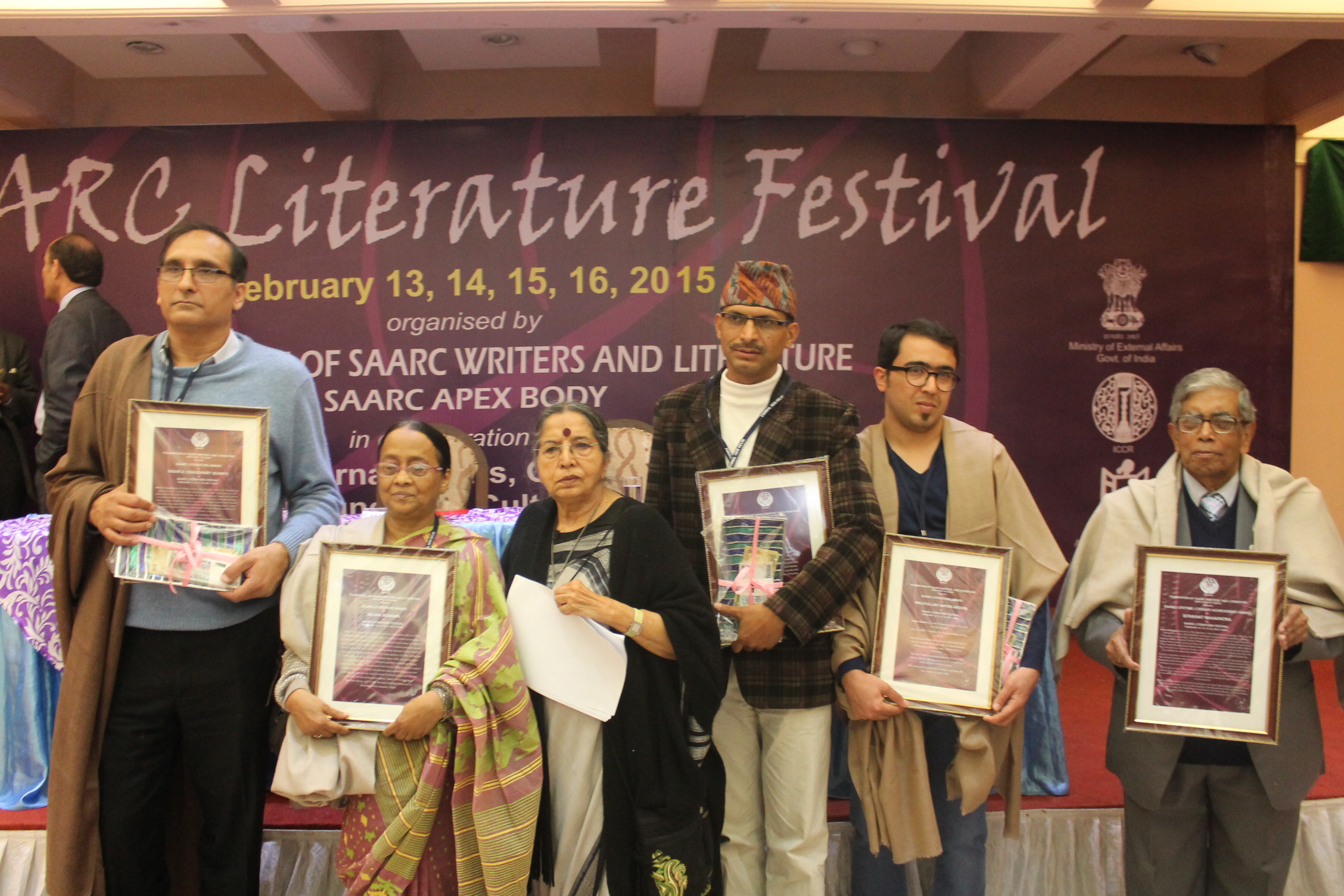
SAARC Literary Award 2015
