= Syed Abid Husain =

Indian educator and philosopher (1896–1978)

- Born: Manzoor Husain; 25 June 1896; Bhopal, British India
- Died: 13 December 1978 (aged 82); Delhi, India
- Spouse(s): Shafat Fatima (m. 1917), Saliha Abid Hussain (m. 1933)
- Awards: Sahitya Akademi Award (1956), Padma Bhushan (1957)

Academic background
- Education: University of Allahabad, Muir Central College, University of Berlin
- Doctoral advisor: Eduard Spranger

Academic work
- Notable works: The National Culture of India, The Destiny of Indian Muslims

Syed Abid Husain (25 July 1896 – 13 December 1978) was an Indian academic, author, educator, and philosopher who played a crucial role in the development of Jamia Millia Islamia. He taught philosophy and led several administrative responsibilities for over 30 years at the university, and shaped the creation of its policies and programs. He was an alumnus of University of Allahabad and Muir Central College, and obtained his PhD from the University of Berlin, where he had studied under Eduard Spranger.

Husain wrote 18 books in English and Urdu, and translated 24 books, including Immanuel Kant's Critique of Pure Reason and Jawaharlal Nehru's Glimpses of World History. His works include Musalman aur asri masa'il and The way of Gandhi and Nehru. He founded the Islamic and the Modern Age Society. He contributed to Indo-German intellectual history with his focus on German educational reform ideas and social theories, which he implemented at the Jamia Millia Islamia. He was awarded the Sahitya Akademi Award in 1956, and Padma Bhushan in 1957 for his contributions to literature. Syed Abid Husain Senior Secondary School at the Jamia is named after him.

== Early life and education ==
Abid Husain was born Manzoor Husain, in Bhopal on 25 July 1896, coinciding with the Hijri date of 14 Safar 1314. His forefathers came from Tirmiz, and settled in India.

Husain received his early education at the Jahangiria High School in Bhopal and completed high school at University of Allahabad, being one of the seven students with the top first rank. He completed his senior secondary education at the Muir Central College, studying science and mathematics. He received a monthly scholarship of 10 rupees from Hamidullah Khan since his senior classes at the school, which continued throughout his higher education, together with a monthly grant of 20 rupees from his elder brother Nasrullah Khan.

Husain completed his undergraduate studies in 1920 with a Bachelor of Arts, having studied English, Persian, and philosophy, and secured top first rank in the entire university. Continuing existing scholarship grants, Hamidullah Khan offered him an additional monthly scholarship of 30 rupees for an MA in English, while also receiving several other scholarships. He briefly enrolled at the Aligarh Muslim University for an M.A. but could not continue due to the political situation. He then enrolled at Oxford for an Honours, completing the foundational subjects in a span of six months, subsequently moving to Berlin, Germany, due to lack of financial resources.

Husain initially enrolled at the University of Berlin as a visitor student, learning the German language in a period of three months. He subsequently did his PhD under the supervision of Eduard Spranger, and completed his doctoral thesis in 1926 in which he had explored the education theory of Herbert Spencer.

== Personal life ==
Husain was married off to his cousin Shafat Fatima in 1917, though he felt he was forced into this marriage and saw it as incompatible.. His father insisted on a second marriage since the couple had no children, which he ignored, and went to Europe for his higher studies. Upon his return, his father insisted again, and Husain did not initially agree due to his dislike for polygamy and his desire not to have children. He subsequently considered marrying again only because he felt his current marriage lacked love, companionship, and a stable home life.

Husain then sought to marry Misdaq Fatima, famously known as Saliha Abid Hussain, who was reluctant to accept the marriage offer because she believed that he was marrying only because his father was demanding an heir, which she perceived as an insult to herself. She then realised Husain's dislike for polygamy, and the consent of his first wife for this marriage. He intended to remain legally married to his first wife and continue supporting her, and he would not proceed without Saliha's acceptance. The two married in 1933. Both of the wives maintained a friendly and sisterly relationship with each other.

== Career ==
=== Jamia Millia Islamia ===
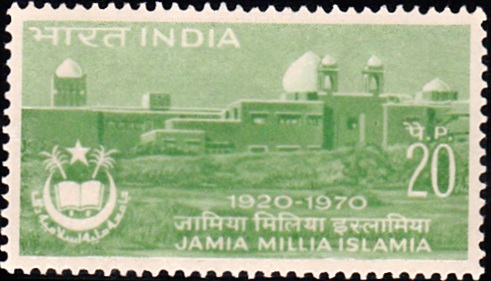
1970 postal stamp, Jamia Millia Islamia

Jamia Millia Islamia moved to Delhi from Aligarh in March 1925, and many people left its service, believing that the university should have remained in Aligarh. The shift affected Jamia's courses and resources, with Jamia's most notable Arts and Crafts being discontinued alongside BA and BSc courses. Husain was part of a triumvirate with Mohammad Mujeeb and Zakir Husain that shaped the future of the university. They responded to an appeal of Mukhtar Ahmad Ansari, committing to growth and development of the Jamia.

The three friends joined Jamia in February 1926, with "their arrival bringing a sense of hope to the university". Zakir Husain, who later on became the president of India, took over as Jamia's vice-chancellor on 15 March 1926, while Abid Husain was appointed as the registrar, and Mujeeb becoming a teacher of history and politics.

Husain taught philosophy to the BA students and the Urdu language at the Jamia school, and received a monthly stipend of INR 200, which was then reduced to INR 100. He served as an officiating vice-chancellor in the absence of Zakir Husain. Husain was appointed as a principal of Jamia school after the death of E.J. Kellat in 1949, a role he served until his return from Germany. He retired from the university after thirty years of service, after having played a crucial role in shaping its policies and programs.

Husain's intellectual focus was on German social theory and educational reform ideas from the early 1900s, which differed from the British liberal trends of that era. He utilised Spranger's educational philosophy, and these theories and reform ideas of German origin at Jamia, and in his role as a policy-maker with the Ministry of Education. This implementation significantly contributed to adaptation, cultural translation, and transformation in the Indo-German intellectual history, alongside the development of reformist-nationalist pedagogy in India.

=== Beyond Jamia ===
In 1930, he took a leave from Jamia to collaborate with Abdul Haq at Anjuman-i Taraqqi-i Urdu on an English-Urdu dictionary and translation projects. He returned to Delhi three years later in 1933, working remotely for the Anjuman at a monthly stipend of INR 200. According to a 10 June 1963 letter of Jawaharlal Nehru, which he addressed to S. K. Dey, Husain was deputed as a community development expert to the Government of Turkey, providing the services for about a year.

Husain was appointed a member of the Official Languages Commission, which was constituted in 1955. He then served as a director of Aligarh Muslim University's Department of Education from 1957 to 1960. Afterwards, at the behest of Jawaharlal Nehru, he served as a literary advisor to the All India Radio from 1960 to 1967, resigining before March 1968.

=== Journals ===
Husain was appointed as the editor of the Risalah Jamia, and he started a fortnightly, Payam-e-Taleem, to share the Jamia's works and objectives with the public. The labour associated with the two journals was divided in 1930, with Jamia serving adults, while Payam-e-Taleem became a children's journal. He was subsequently given the administrative responsibilities of the Department of Writing and Compilation.

Husain started a weekly Nai Roshni (New Light), the first edition of which was published on 16 June 1948. He founded the Islamic and the Modern Age Society, and started academic journals including Islam aur Asr-i-Jadeed and Islam and the Modern Age, in favour of a role for religions and religious thought in overcoming materialism.

=== Rockefeller Foundation fellowship ===
In 1954-55, Husain received a fellowship from the Rockefeller Foundation to facilitate work on minority and national culture in India, allowing him to revise and translate his own three-volume work Hindustani qaumiyat aur qaumi tahzib (Indian Nationalism and National Culture), to explore and examine the historical impact of Islam and the Muslim community in India. The Urdu edition was revised as Qaumi tahzib ka maslah, translated as The Question of National Culture. He had originally written this book in 1946, before the Partition of India. He spent the fellowship time with his teacher Spranger in Tübingen.

== Books ==
Husain was an Urdu litterateur who has been described as a front-rank thinker and scholar, "who authored several books of high academic value and national importance". He wrote about 18 original books, both in English and Urdu, and translated about 24 books, in the genres of biography, literature, philosophy, and social sciences. He analysed and evaluated "movements outside the conventional category of religion" in his works.

=== Original works ===
Husain was an Urdu playwright and authored dramas including Parda-i-Ghaflat (transl. The Veil of Ignorance) and Shareer Ladka (transl. The Wicked Boy). Parda-i-Ghaflat explored the effect and impact of the seclusion of women inside homes, and initiated social reform discourses, particularly related to women's access to modern education, while Shareer Ladka examined the mental and emotional struggles of teenagers through the story of a teacher's new approach to instruction, highlighting how using theater as a teaching method provided a unique and creative way to improve education. He authored Qaumī tahzīb kā masʼalah (National Culture of India), for which he was awarded the Sahitya Academy Award in 1956. His 1965 work The Destiny of Indian Muslims explored potential future outcomes of the Muslim community in India, and tried to help resolve the predicaments and challenges that they had been facing after the 1947 Partition of India.

Husain's other works include:

- Bazmi- Be-takalluf
- Compulsory education in India; Progress of compulsory education in India, 1951-1966, co-authored with Khwaja Ghulam Saiyidain, and Jayant Pandurang Naik.
- Gandhi and communal unity
- Hindustani Qawmiyat aur Qawmi tahzīb (3 volumes)
- MusalmanoN ki Talim aur Jamia Millia
- Musalman aur asri masa'il.
- The way of Gandhi and Nehru
- What is general education?

=== Translations ===
Husain was a high-volume translator. He contributed to several translation projects of the Anjuman-i Taraqqi-i Urdu.. He translated works from English, German, and French into Urdu.. His translations include:

- Faust, Part One
- Hindustan me Taleem ki az Sar-E-Nau Tanzeem, Urdu translation of Zakir Husain's Educational reconstruction in India.
- Jag Jeeti, two volume translation of Jawaharlal Nehru's Glimpses of World History.
- Nafsiyat-e-Unfawan-i-Shabab, Urdu translation of Eduard Spranger's Psychology of the Youth.
- Saint Joan
- Talash-i-Hind, Urdu translation of Jawaharlal Nehru's The Discovery of India
- Talash-i-Haq, Urdu translation of The Story of My Experiments with Truth, autobiography of Mahatma Gandhi
- Tarikh Falsafa-i-Islam, originally written as The History of Philosophy in Islam by T.J. de Boer in German language.
- Tanqeed Aql-i-Mahaz, Urdu translation of Kant's Critique of Pure Reason
- Wilhelm Meister - two volumes

== Reception and awards ==
Husain, together with Mohammad Mujeeb, propounded an alternative to composite nationalism and secularism, promoting a conception that the Indian Muslim community did not confine to a separate community, which was very distinct from the thoughts of Deobandi scholars.

In 1956, Husain received the Sahitya Akademi Award in Urdu, and a year later, he was awarded the Padma Bhushan, third-highest civilian award in India. He received the Sahitya Kala Parishad Award in 1973. Mushirul Hasan described him as a Muslim intellectual whose work focused on interfaith relations and the promotion of liberal Islamic principles. He was also conferred with an honorary D. Litt by the Mahatma Gandhi Kashi Vidyapith.

== Death and legacy ==
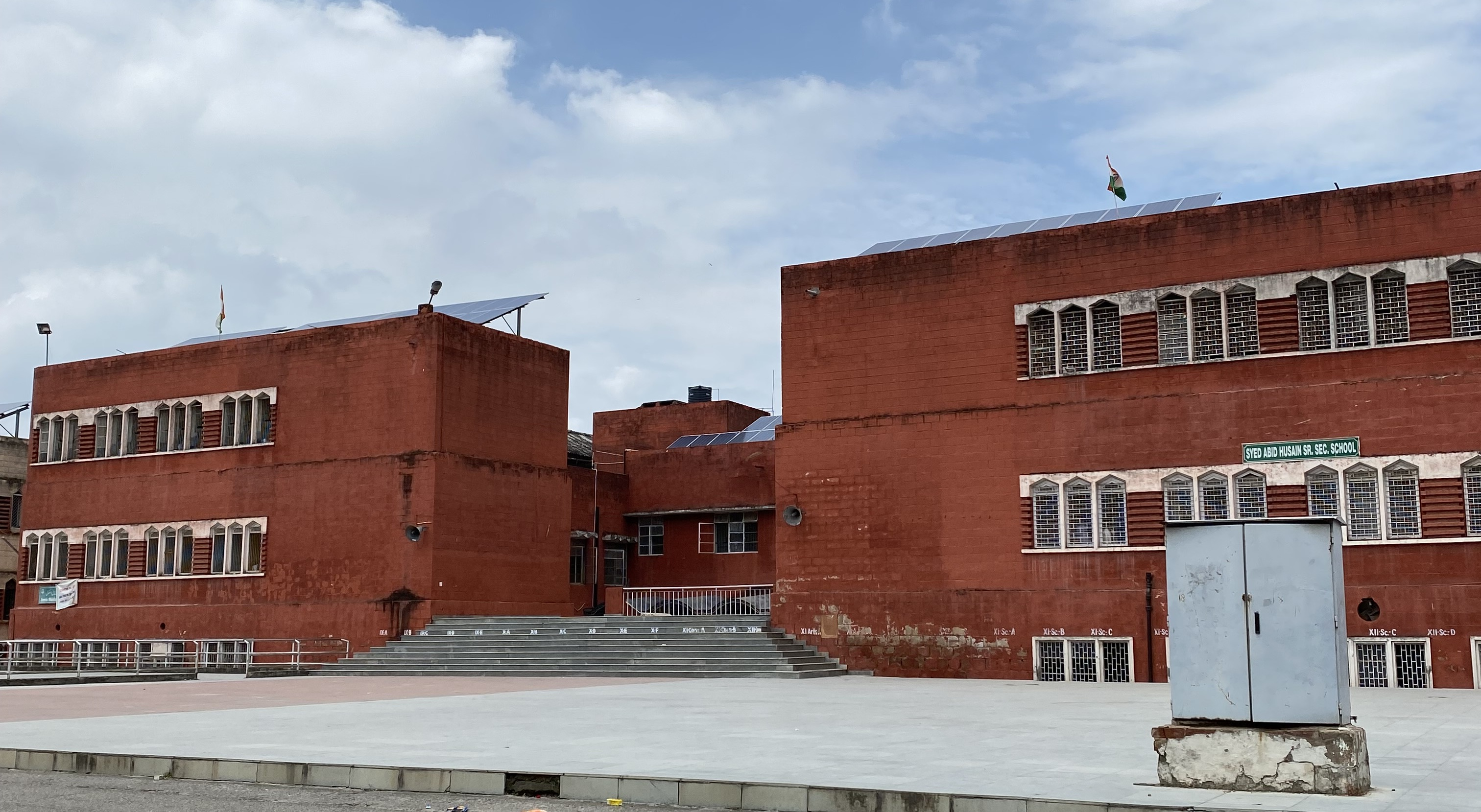
Syed Abid Husain Senior Secondary School at the Jamia Millia Islamia

Husain was diagnosed with a bladder cancer in 1974. He died of this on 13 December 1978, and was buried in the cemetery of the Jamia Millia Islamia.
