= Jamia Millia Islamia student union protests 2026 =

Campus protest

- Protest site on 19 October
- Date: 12 October 2026 - 29 October 2026 (106th Foundation day of JMI)
- Location: Jamia Millia Islamia
- Goals: Restoration of JMI Students' Union
- Methods: Hunger strike, peaceful demonstration, sit-ins
- Result: Student Union Restoration

Parties
| JMI Administration | Students |

Lead figures
| Mazhar Asif, Mahtab Alam Rizvi | Ebin Basil, Jasim Khan, Rehan Khan, Rehan Hyder and Rida Naushad Khan |

"Respect my Existence or Expect my Resistance" slogan on a wall

On 12 October 2026, students at Jamia Millia Islamia in New Delhi initiated campus demonstrations and a hunger strike demanding the restoration of the Jamia Millia Islamia Students' Union (JMISU). The university had dissolved its student union in 2006.

On 26 October 2026, the university administration announced that student union elections would take place within 15 days after the approval of a new union constitution, while also revoking suspension orders and show-cause notices issued against protesting students. However, several protesting students sought revisions to the order, asking for fixed dates and a due timeline for elections. By 28 October, the university entirely moved online, announcing end-semester exams to be held in online mode. The administration subsequently announced 15 May 2027 as the deadline for approval and implementation of the union's constitution, declaring elections to be conducted within six weeks after the start of new academic session on 16 July 2027. The students called off the demonstration on 29 October 2026, the 106th Foundation day of the university, after the administration assured them of elections and other actions within the stipulated timeline.

== Background ==
The first Jamia Millia Islamia Student Union's election was held in 1981. The last elected student union at Jamia Millia Islamia operated until 2006, when it was dissolved, citing campus violence and disruptions in academic activities. Students have protested and made demands of Student's Union previously as well including the Hunger strike in 2017 but it was suppressed. Student representation subsequently functioned under a subject association model, in which department deans maintained veto power over student decisions. Protesting students argued that this arrangement provided no effective channel to communicate student grievances directly to university leadership. The issues raised include unfair admission processes, faculty recruitment, department infrastructure, hostel seat allotments, administrative transparency, and food quality in messes. In August 2026, the Jamia administration suspended four students for protesting against irregularities in the admission process.

== Protest ==
Students initiated protests on 12 October 2026, and five students began a hunger strike, demanding restoration of the Student Union at the university. The students on hunger strike included Ebin Basil, Jasim Khan, Rehan Khan, Rehan Hyder and Rida Naushad Khan, who were subsequently joined by about 500 and more students. Rida was the sole female participant on hunger strike, who ended her eight-day fast to return home after her mother fell ill.

On Sunday, 18 October 2026, the students asked for an immediate restoration of the student union, revocation of disciplinary charges against protesting students, and a stop to all types of punitive measures, in a press conference. They also demanded the resignation of the university's chief proctor, holding him responsible for the forcible removal of students and detention.

The students caught a person masquerading as a student, raising objectionable slogans. They found an ITBP uniform in his bag. The varsity's VC Mazhar Asif has also been accused of serving the ideology of the Rashtriya Swayamsevak Sangh.

By 29 October 2026, 5 students remained on hunger strike, including Ebin Basil, Rehan Khan, Ritik, Abu Zahir, and Mohammad Altaf.

The protest and hunger strike were called off on 29 October 2026 after the university administration declared 15 May 2027 as a definite date for the implementation of the Jamia Student Union's constitution.

== Property damage ==
On 28 October 2026, administration shared visuals showing damage to university property, including broken windows and surveillance cameras. The administration accused students of forcibly entering the campus and causing damage.

== Administrative actions ==
Gate 7 entrance on 28 October 2026

On 16 October 2026, the university rusticated one of the protesting students, suspended two others, and banned all of them from entering the university campus for a period of one year. The administration sealed and locked an emergency gate near the Ibn-e-Sina Block, historically used during emergencies like waterlogging.

On 24 October 2026, the university shifted classes online and closed down the campus. The administration heavily deployed forces at the campus gates to prevent student entry. More than 1500 faculty members from teaching and non-teaching facilities, alongside VC Mazhar Asif, marched towards the protest site inside Gate 7, to remove the protesting students. The faculty, accompanied by security personnel, destroyed the protest tent. The administration cut off electricity and water facilities on campus, barred entry and exit, and restricted access to the central library.

The university administration lodged a complaint against Imran Pratapgarhi and Imran Masood, both members of the Indian parliament, for trespassing into the campus. On 27 October 2026, Delhi police imposed Section 163 of the Bharatiya Nagarik Suraksha Sanhita outside Gate 7 of the campus. The campus has been described as a fortress with heavy deployment of ITBP, the Delhi Police, and the Railway Protection Force, accompanied by a riot controlling vehicle, a tear gas van, and several detention buses.

On 26 October 2026, the university revoked student suspensions through an official notification signed by Mahtab Alam Rizvi, the registrar of the university. The circular stated that the student union elections would be held 15 days after the union's constitution was approved. Protesting students find this ambiguous and have sought more transparent and fixed dates. On 28 October 2026, end-semester theory exams and other practical exams were also shifted online, with an expectation to open the campus after 13 January 2027 after a security review.

On 29 October 2026, Jamia administration announced 15 May 2027 as a definite date for the approval and implementation of the constitution for its student union. Subsequently, the elections are to be held within six weeks after the beginning of the academic session on 16 July 2027. Classes were moved back to offline mode from 2 November 2026, alongside university examinations.

== Reactions ==
On 28 October 2026, Pralhad Joshi, the Union Minister of Education, advised students to maintain order in the protests and not to turn it into a law and order problem. The minister also stated that efforts are being made to organise the student union elections. Congress politician Pawan Khera observed that this protest was a "damning commentary on the state of democracy in our country, especially from the perspective of youth", when forming student unions is guaranteed under Article 19(1)(c) of the Indian Constitution.
