= Chamberlain's Theory of Strategy =

Geoffrey P. Chamberlain's theory of strategy was first published in 2010. The theory draws on the work of Alfred D. Chandler, Jr., Kenneth R. Andrews, Henry Mintzberg and James Brian Quinn but is more specific and attempts to cover the main areas they did not address. Chamberlain analyzes the strategy construct by treating it as a combination of four factors.

== Factor 1. What strategy is ==
The theory introduces a specific and coherent interpretation of the strategy construct. Chamberlain argues that it is not possible either to analyze or compare strategies if we cannot clearly describe and categorize what we are looking at. Factor 1 is summarized in seven propositions:
Proposition 1: Strategy operates in a bounded domain (i.e., separate from the policy, tactical and operational domains).
Proposition 2: A strategy has a single, coherent focus.
Proposition 3: A strategy consists of a basic direction and a broad path.
Proposition 4: A strategy can be deconstructed into elements.
Proposition 5: Each of the individual components of a strategy's broad path (i.e., each of its essential thrusts) is a single coherent concept directly addressing the delivery of the basic direction.
Proposition 6: A strategy's essential thrusts each imply a specific channel of influence.
Proposition 7: A strategy's constituent elements are each formed either deliberately or emergently.

== Factor 2. The forces that shape strategy ==
Chamberlain's theory states that an entity's strategy is the result of the interaction of a variety of forces in and around the entity, with the strategist's cognitive bias. Those forces are divided arbitrarily into three broad categories: internal, external, and shareholders.
His cognitive bias theory applies two long-established psychological theories (Michael Kirton's “adaption-innovation” theory and Eduard Spranger’s theory that there are six types of cognitive emphasis) to identify twelve types of strategist. Chamberlain argues that only six of these types are likely to be successful as strategists, and describes those six, which he calls Operators, Executives, Administrators, Entrepreneurs, Pioneers and Visionaries.

== Factor 3. The processes that form strategy ==
Chamberlain asserts that his Factors 1 and 2 implicitly specify the various processes that can be involved in strategy formation. He explains these and shows how they relate to each other by presenting a simple sequential process chart that distinguishes between deliberate and emergent strategy at each step. He claims that this aspect of his theory offers a solution to an old dispute in the management literature over the technical and practical differences between deliberate and emergent strategy formation.

== Factor 4. The mechanisms by which strategy can take effect ==
As explained above, Factor 1 divides any entity’s environment into three categories. In his Factor 4 discussion, Chamberlain divides the ways in which each of those environmental areas can be influenced, into two types. The first type, the rational approach, consists of only considering standard economic forces, as described for example by Adam Smith, Joseph Schumpeter and Michael Porter. The second type of influence technique, the social approach, considers combinations of economic and psychological forces, including for example those described by Herbert A. Simon, Hillman and Hitt, and Pfeffer and Salancik. Combining the three environmental areas with the two influence techniques creates six categories of techniques strategies can employ to achieve their intended effects. Chamberlain calls these categories “channels of influence” (see Proposition 6 above), and asserts that a competent strategist is able to use all of the six. He argues that a strategist who only considers one channel of influence – for example the external rational channel, which Porter's theories rely on – is trapped in a paradigm.

== Usage ==
Chamberlain states that his theory applies to any organization's strategy, whatever the type or size of organization – business, military, religious, non-profit, union, social club, administrative or political branch of government, or even individual people.

== Current practical limitations of Chamberlain's theory ==
To date, empirical validation of Chamberlain's theory is limited to the cases analyzed in his book: two-stage longitudinal descriptions and analyses of the strategies of just ten organizations. Adequate validation of the theory requires use of his analytical process by other, independent researchers to classify a much larger number of organizations’ strategies, and their strategists’ cognitive biases.

== Note ==
Chamberlain defines a strategist as the person or group that makes, or has the power to make, the organization's strategic decisions. He regards analysts and advisors – however creative – as strategy practitioners but not strategists.
