= Heinz Mosche Graupe =

- Born: 22 April 1906; Berlin, Germany
- Died: 23 March 1997 (aged 90); Chicago, Illinois

Academic background
- Thesis: Die Stellung der Religion im systematischen Denken der Marburger Schule (1930)
- Doctoral advisor: Eduard Spranger

Heinz Mosche Graupe (22 April 1906 – 23 March 1997) was a German philosopher, historian and scholar of Jewish studies. He was the first director of the Institut für die Geschichte der deutschen Juden.

== Selected publications ==
- Graupe, Heinz Moshe (1961). "Kant und das Judentum". Zeitschrift für Religions- und Geistesgeschichte. 13 (4): 308–333. doi:10.1163/157007361X00091.
- Die Entstehung des modernen Judentums. Geistesgeschichte der deutschen Juden. 1650–1942. Hamburg: Leibniz-Verlag. 1969. Published in English as The Rise of Modern Judaism: An Intellectual History of German Jewry, 1650–1942 (1978).
- Die Statuten der drei Gemeinden Altona, Hamburg und Wandsbek. Quellen zur jüdischen Gemeindeorganisation im 17. und 18. Jahrhundert. Hamburg: Christians. 1973. ISBN 3-7672-0256-5.
- The Systematic Nature of Jewish Theology: Two Examples. Chicago: Academy Chicago Publishers. 1995. ISBN 0-89733-423-X.
