= Dayar e Shauq Mera =

Anthem of Jamia Millia Islamia

Dayar-e-shauq mera
English: This is the land of my hopes
- Lyrics: Mohammed Khaliq Siddiqui, 1964

Dayar e Shauq Mera (Hindi: दयार-ए-शौक़ मेरा, Urdu: دیار شوق میرا) or Diyar e Shauq Mera is the Tarana of the central university Jamia Millia Islamia. The lyrics were written by Mohammed Khaliq Siddiqui in 1964. The Tarana is recited every year during the Foundation Day celebration and all official functions (Note: convocation, prize distribution, on visits by guests, political leaders and foreign dignitaries) at Jamia Millia Islamia.

== History ==
During the 44th Foundation Day of Jamia Millia Islamia in 1964, Mohammad Khaliq Siddiqui (1922-1981) released a poem in the journal "Jamia" (as Gumnam Jamaii’/ Anonymous Jamaii). This poem gained immense popularity. Hilal Ahmed Khan, the music teacher at Jamia during that time, composed a melody for the poem, which eventually became the official anthem of Jamia Millia Islamia.
