= Syed Abid Husain Senior Secondary School =

High school in New Delhi, India

Syed Abid Husain Sr. Secondary school
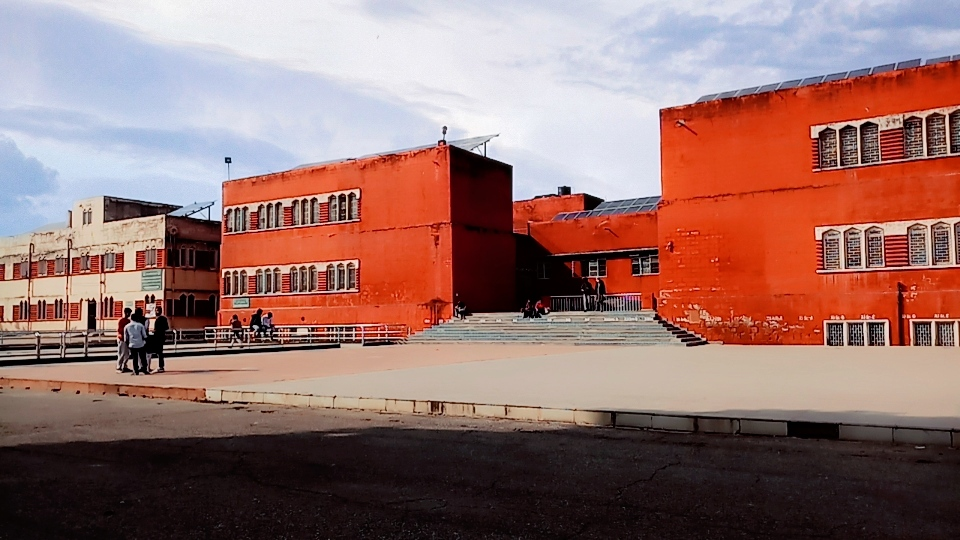
- Main building of S.A.H. Sr. Sec. School (right) adjacent to Jamia Middle school (left)

Location
- Okhla, Delhi; India; 28°33′42.9732″N 77°17′5.3268″E

Information
- Former names: Jamia Senior Secondary School (Self-financed)
- School type: Senior Secondary
- Motto: ʻallam al-insān-a mā lam yaʻlam (Taught man what he knew not.)
- Established: 1989
- Sister school: Jamia Sr. Secondary school, Jamia Girls Sr. secondary school, Jamia Middle school, Mushir Fatma Jamia Nursery school
- School board: Jamia Board (affiliated with CBSE)
- School district: South East Delhi
- Authority: Jamia Millia Islamia
- Principal: Shagufta Shandar
- Enrollment: 2200+
- Classes: Prep to Class XII
- Average class size: 40-60
- Language: English, Urdu, Hindi
- Schedule type: Morning & Evening
- Hours in school day: 6 hrs
- Campus type: co-educational
- Houses: Jauhar; Zakir; Gandhi; Nehru
- Colours: Antique White and Saddle Brown
- Nickname: S.A.H.S.S.S
- Affiliation: Jamia Millia Islamia
- Website: www.jmi.ac.in/ACADEMICS/School/Syed-Abid-Husain-Senior-Secondary-School/Introduction

Syed Abid Husain Sr. Secondary School (SAHSSS) is a self-financed school located in Jamia Nagar, Okhla, Delhi. It falls under the jurisdiction of Jamia Millia Islamia, its parent university. When JMI shifted from Aligarh to Karol Bagh in 1925, the premises of Jamia Schools were one of the first to be built in Okhla. The school itself was founded in 1989 as a private self-financed school under Jamia Millia Islamia. Although the school has its own board, it follows the CBSE pattern.

== History ==
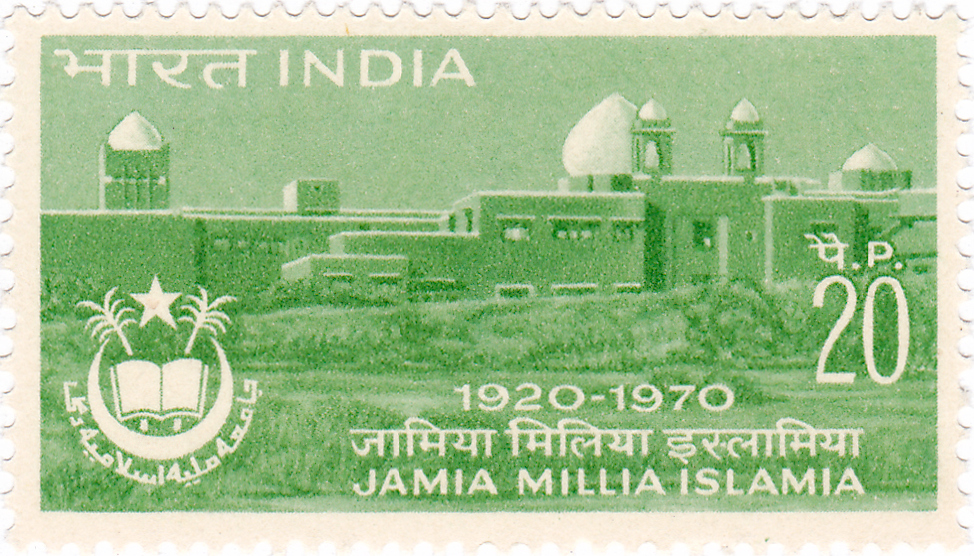
The school hostel building on a 1970 India post stamp

Founded in 1989, Syed Abid Husain Senior Secondary School operates under the aegis of Jamia Millia Islamia (JMI) in Delhi. The school is named in honor of Syed Abid Husain, a scholar, educator, and one of the founding members of Jamia Millia Islamia. Husain made significant contributions to Indian education and literature, writing extensively in both Urdu and English. The school's buildings and hostels were among the first structures constructed in 1935 after Jamia relocated from Karol Bagh to Okhla during British India.

== Admission ==
Admissions are conducted on the basis of entrance examinations for classes 6th, 9th and 11th and on the basis of drawing of lots for preschool.

== Gallery ==
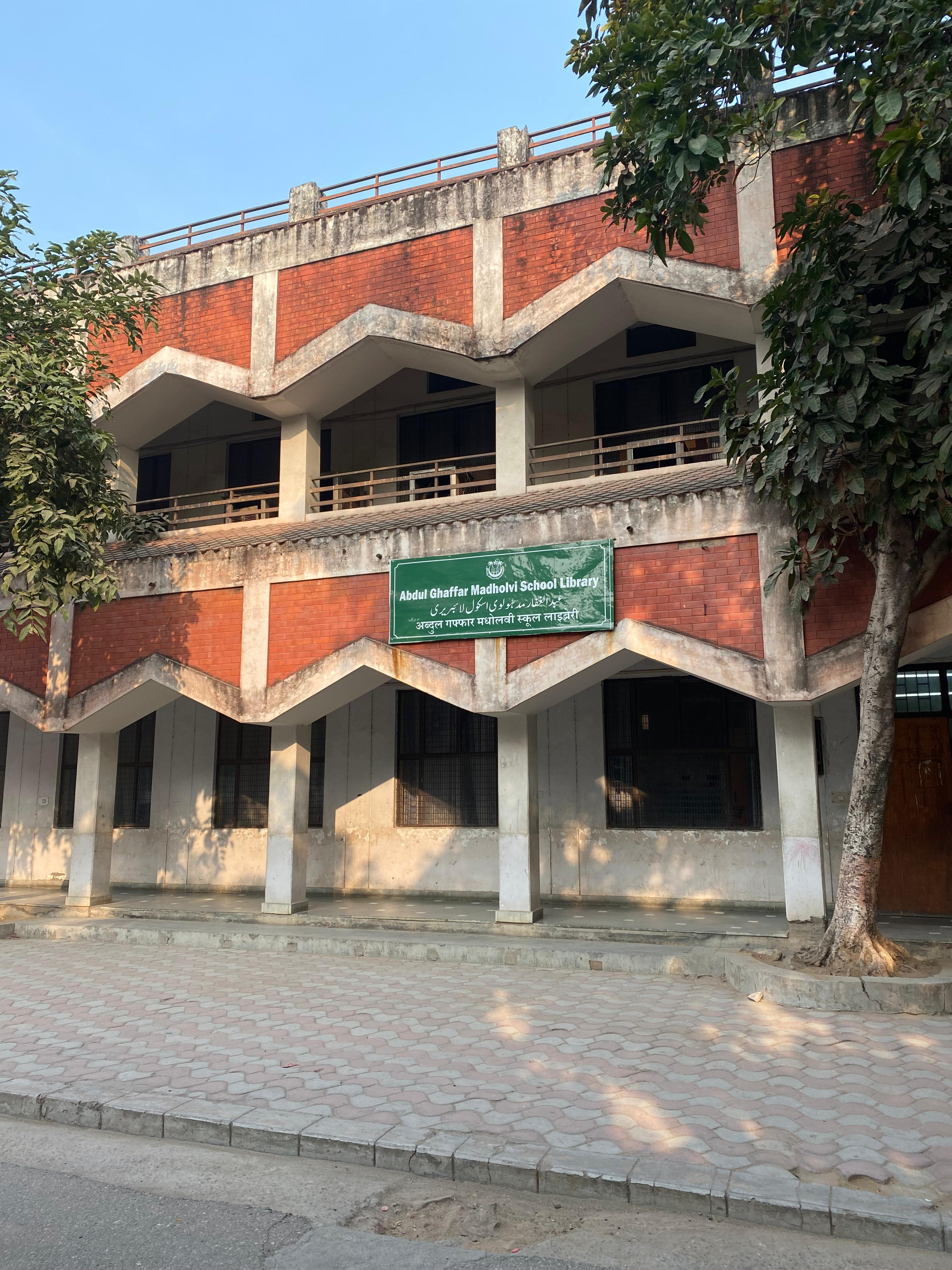
Abdul Ghaffar Madholvi School Library

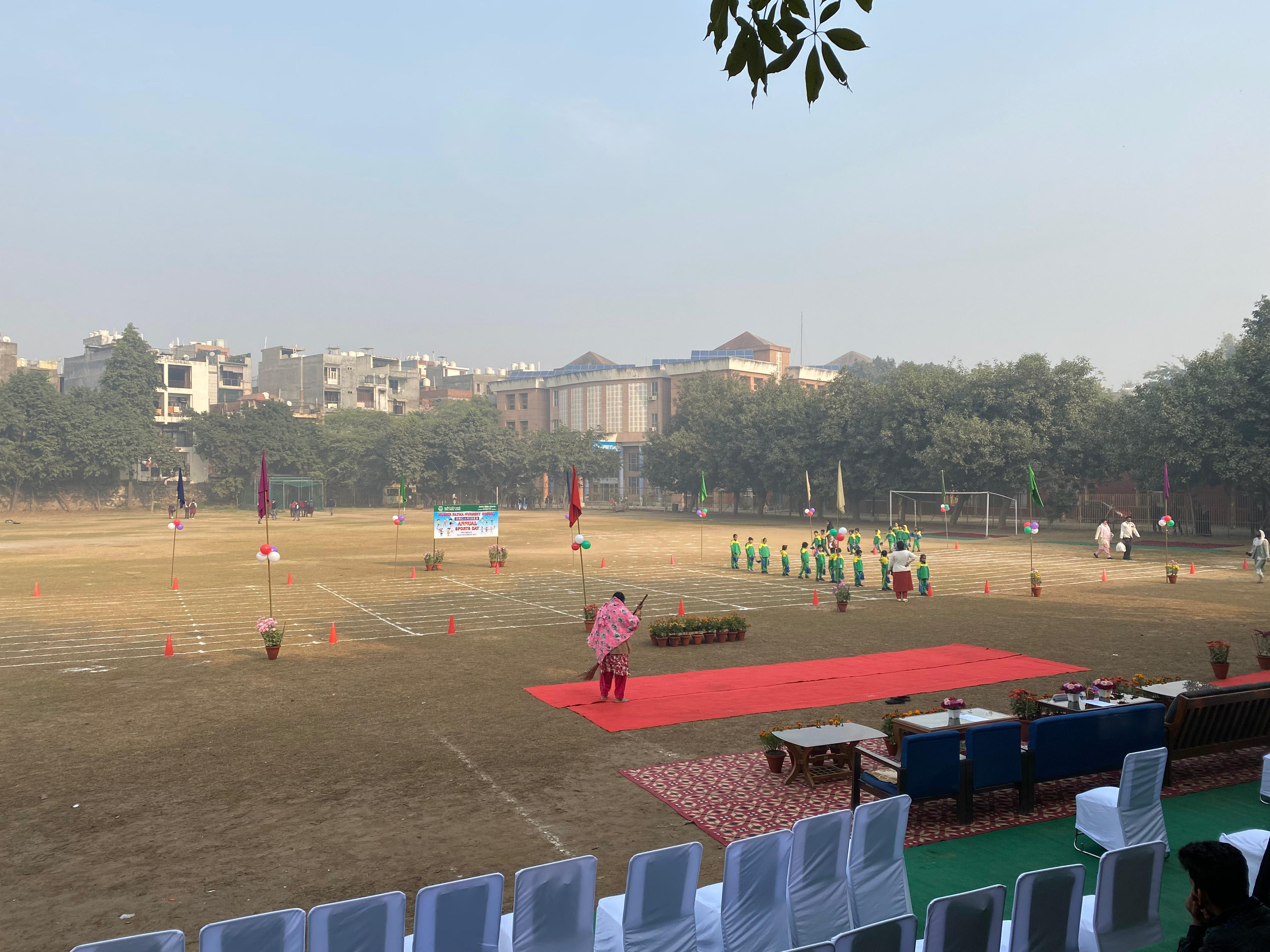
School playground of Jamia Millia Islamia

== See also ==
- Jamia Hamdard
- Education in Delhi
- Education in India
- List of schools in Delhi
