= Saliha Abid Hussain =

Indian writer of Urdu literature

- Born: India
- Occupation: Novelist
- Known for: Urdu literature
- Awards: Padma Shri

Saliha Abid Hussain (1913 - 1988) was an Indian writer of Urdu literature, considered by many to be one of the prominent writers of modern Urdu novels and children's literature.

== Early life ==
Saliha was born as Misdaq Fatima in August 1913 in Panipat. Her father, Khwaja Gulamus Saqalain, was a reformist Islamic scholar, while her mother, Mushtaq Fatima, was a granddaughter of Altaf Hussain Hali.

== Career ==
She is the author of works such as Azra, Rekhta, Yadgaray hali Baat Cheet and Jane Walon ki Yad Ati Hai. The Government of India awarded her the fourth highest Indian civilian honour of Padma Shri in 1983. Her life has been documented in a biography, Saliha Abid Hussain, written by Sughra Mehdi and published in 1993.

Her writing covered many subjects, including women's rights, and according to her niece Dr Sayeda Hameed, who curated the exhibition Pathbreakers: The 20th Century Muslim Women of India at the Bangalore International Centre in 2020, "She spoke out against Triple Talaq and other subjects fearlessly."

== See also ==
- Urdu literature
