= Mohammad Mujeeb =

Indian writer (1902–1985)

- Born: 1902; India
- Died: 1985 (aged 83)
- Occupations: Writer; Educationist; Scholar
- Years active: 1926–1985
- Known for: Jamia Millia Islamia
- Awards: Padma Bhushan

Mohammad Mujeeb (1902–1985) was an Indian writer of English and Urdu literature, educationist, scholar and the vice chancellor of Jamia Millia Islamia, Delhi.

== Early life and education ==
Mujeeb was born in 1902 to Mohammad Naseem, a wealthy barrister from Lucknow.

Mujeeb studied history at Oxford University. He was a close friend and associate of Zakir Hussain, the third president of India, and Abid Husain. Later, he did advanced training in printing in Germany before returning to India to join Jamia Millia Islamia in 1926 as a faculty member, along with Zakir Hussain and Abid Hussain.

== Career ==
He was a scholar of History and was involved in the cultural and educational milieu of post-independent India.

== Literary works ==
=== English ===
- A Glimpse of New China
- Ordeal 1857: A Historical Play
- World history, our heritage
- Education and Traditional values
- Social reform among Indian Muslims
- Akbar
- Ghalib
- Dr Zakir Hussain: a biography
- Islamic Influence on Indian Society
- The Indian Muslims
- Education, Literature and Islam
- Three Plays

=== Urdu ===
- Dunya Ki Kahani
- Azma’ish
- Gazaliyat-e-Ghalib
- Tarikh Falsafa-e-Siyasiyat
- Nigarishat
- Rusi Adab

== Awards ==
Padma Bhushan (1965) for his contributions to literature and education.

== Death and legacy ==
Mujeeb died in 1985, at the age of 83. Jamia Millia Islamia has instituted an annual oration, Professor Mohammad Mujeeb Memorial Lecture, in Mujeeb's honour.

== See also ==
- Jamia Millia Islamia
