= Jamia Millia Islamia =

Public university in Delhi, India

- Official seal of JMI
- Other name: JMI
- Motto: ʻallam al-insān-a mā lam yaʻlam
- Motto in English: Taught man what he knew not.
- Type: Public research university
- Established: 29 October 1920; 106 years ago
- Founders: Maulana Azad; Muhammad Iqbal; Mahmud Hasan Deobandi; Mohammad Ali Jauhar; Hakim Ajmal Khan; Mukhtar Ahmed Ansari; Abdul Majeed Khwaja; Zakir Husain
- Accreditation: NAAC, NBA, UGC
- Affiliations: NIRF
- Academic affiliations: ACU, AIU, AICTE, BCI, CCIM, COA, DCI, DGCA, ICAR, INC, NCTE, NMC, PCI, RCI, WES
- Budget: ₹538.16 crore (US$57 million) (2022-23)
- Chancellor: Mufaddal Saifuddin
- Vice-Chancellor: Mazhar Asif
- Visitor: President of India
- Students: 24,138
- Undergraduates: 9,430
- Postgraduates: 5,189
- Doctoral students: 1644
- Location: Delhi, Delhi, India; 28°33′45″N 77°17′00″E
- Campus: Urban, 239 acres (97 ha)
- Anthem: "Dayar-e-Shauq Mera"
- Colors: Green
- Sporting affiliations: NCC, NSS
- Website: jmi.ac.in

Jamia Millia Islamia is a public research university located in Delhi, India. Originally established at Aligarh, United Provinces (present-day Uttar Pradesh, India) during the British Raj in 1920, it moved to its current location in Delhi, Okhla in 1935. It was given the deemed status by the University Grants Commission in 1962. Jamia Millia Islamia became a central university by an act of the Indian parliament which was passed on 26 December 1988.

The university was founded by Mohammad Ali Jauhar, Hakim Ajmal Khan, Mahmud Hasan Deobandi, Mukhtar Ahmed Ansari, Abdul Majeed Khwaja, Zakir Hussain, Mahatma Gandhi and Maulana Azad. Its foundation stone was laid by Mahmud Hasan Deobandi, the leader of Silk Letter Movement and the first student of Darul Uloom Deoband along with his fellow Mohammed Ali Jauhar, Hakim Ajmal Khan, Mukhtar Ahmad Ansari, and Abdul Majid Khwaja.

Jauhar served as its first vice-chancellor from 1920 to 1923, and Khan served as the first chancellor from 1920 to 1927. On 26 May 2017, Najma Heptulla became 11th and the first woman Chancellor of the university, and Najma Akhtar became the first woman to hold the post of Vice Chancellor in April 2019 and served until 12 November 2023. On 13 March 2023, Mufaddal Saifuddin was elected the 12th Chancellor of the university.

In 2020, Jamia Millia Islamia was ranked 1st among all central universities in the country in rankings released by Ministry of Education of India. In December 2021, the university received an 'A++' ranking by National Assessment and Accreditation Council (NAAC).

== History ==
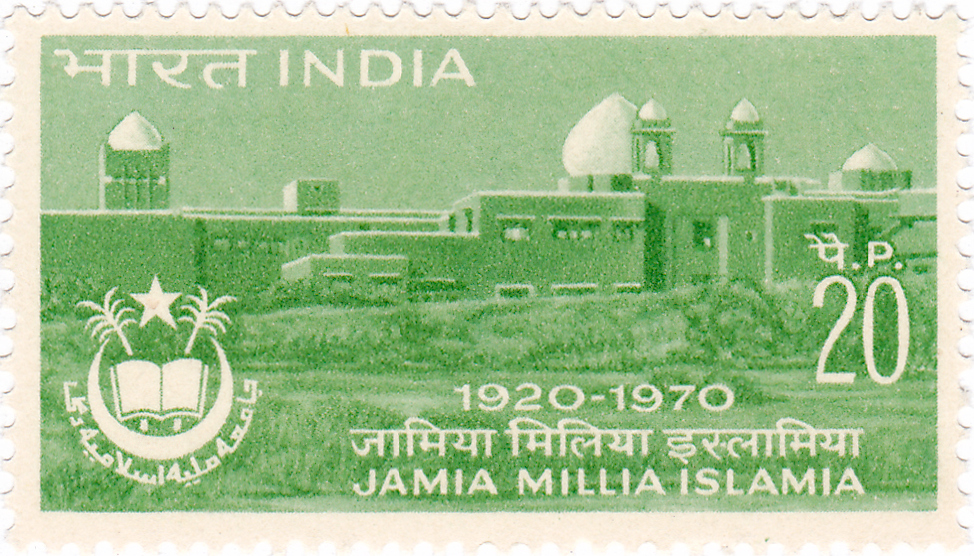
A 1970 Indian stamp dedicated to the 50th anniversary of Jamia Millia Islamia

Jamia Millia Islamia was established in Aligarh on 29 October 1920 by nationalist leaders and students of Aligarh Muslim University.

Mohammad Ali Jauhar, Hakim Ajmal Khan, Mukhtar Ahmad Ansari, and Abdul Majeed Khwaja were its founding members. It was established in response to demands by a group of students and teachers from the Aligarh Muslim University for a new National Muslim University which would be free from government influence as they perceived the administration of Aligarh Muslim University to be pro-British.

=== Foundation ===
The founding members included Muhammad Ali Jauhar, Hakim Ajmal Khan and Mukhtar Ahmed Ansari. The foundation stone of the university was laid by Mahmud Hasan Deobandi, an Islamic scholar and activist of the Indian independence movement who was invited to Aligarh to preside over the ceremony. His speech was prepared and read aloud by his student Shabbir Ahmad Usmani. Its subsequent makers included Abdul Majeed Khwaja, Syed Abid Husain, Mohammad Mujeeb and Zakir Hussain.

The foundation committee of Jamia included Kifayatullah Dehlawi, Hussain Ahmad Madani, Syed Sulaiman Nadwi, Abdul Haq, Abdul Bari Firangi Mahali, Shabbir Ahmad Usmani, Sanaullah Amritsari, Syed Mahmud, and Saifuddin Kitchlew.

It was conceived as a national institution that would offer progressive education and an emphasis on Indian nationalism to students from all communities, particularly Muslims. Hussain described "the movement of Jamia Millia Islamia as a struggle for education and cultural renaissance that aims to prepare a blueprint for Indian Muslims which may focus on Islam but simultaneously evolve a national culture for common Indian." The emergence of Jamia was supported by Mahatma Gandhi, who felt that Jamia Millia Islamia could shape lives of students on the basis of a shared culture and worldview, so Gandhi sent his youngest son Devdas Gandhi to teach Hindi in Jamia.

In 1925, Jamia Millia Islamia moved from Aligarh to Karol Bagh, Delhi. On 1 March 1935, the foundation stone for a school building was laid at Okhla, then a nondescript village in the southern outskirts of Delhi. In 1936, all institutions of Jamia Millia Islamia except Jamia Press, the Maktaba, and the library moved to the new campus.

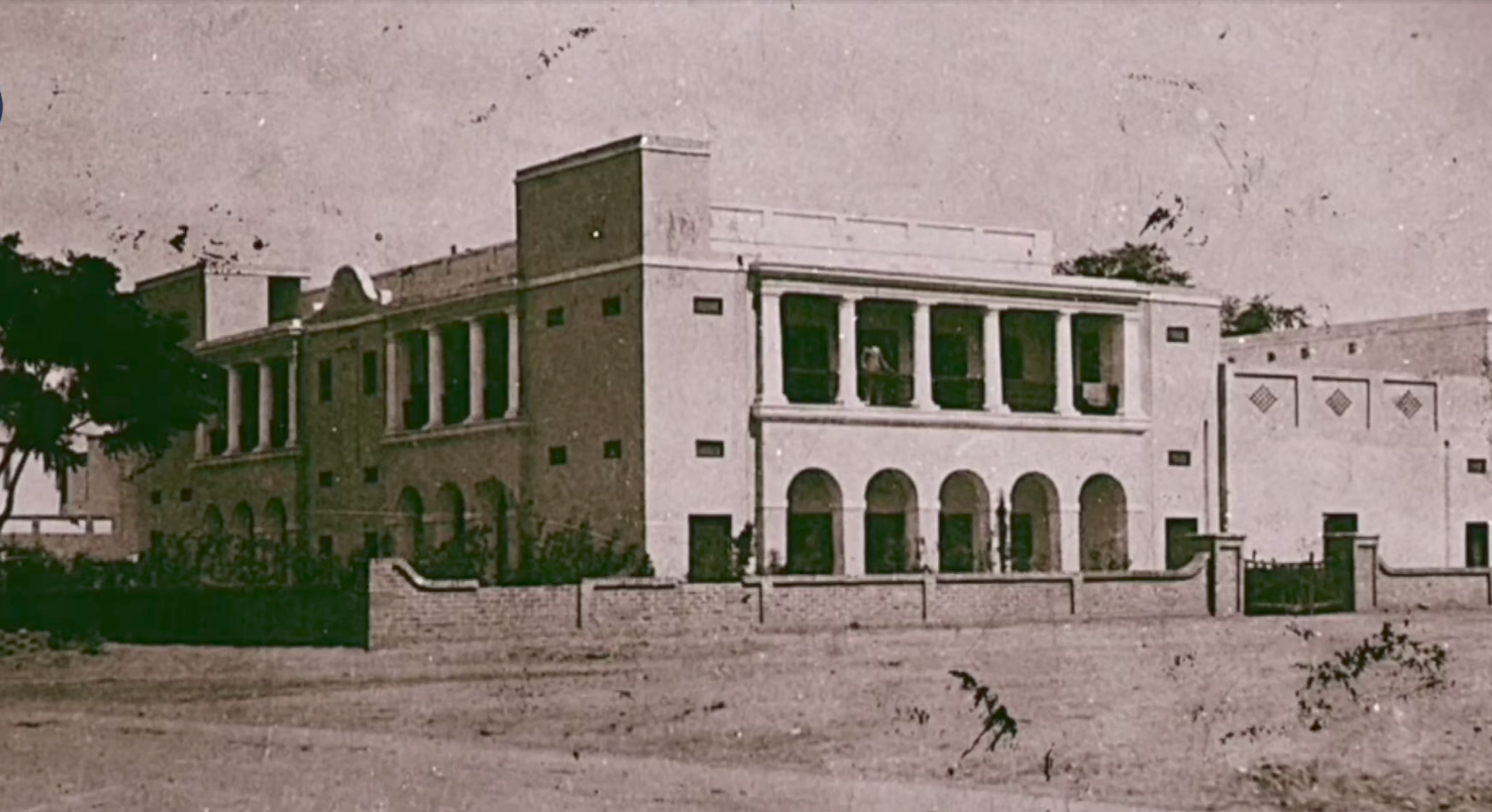
Jamia Millia Islamia, Karol Bagh Campus, 1925

The University Grants Commission gave Jamia Millia Islamia the deemed status in 1962. Subsequently, on 26 December 1988, it attained the status of a central university through an act of the Indian parliament.

In 2006, King Abdullah of Saudi Arabia paid a visit to the university and donated ₹130 crore(US$30 million) (Note: 1USD≈43.35INR, exchange rate in 2006) for the construction of a library and a research center.

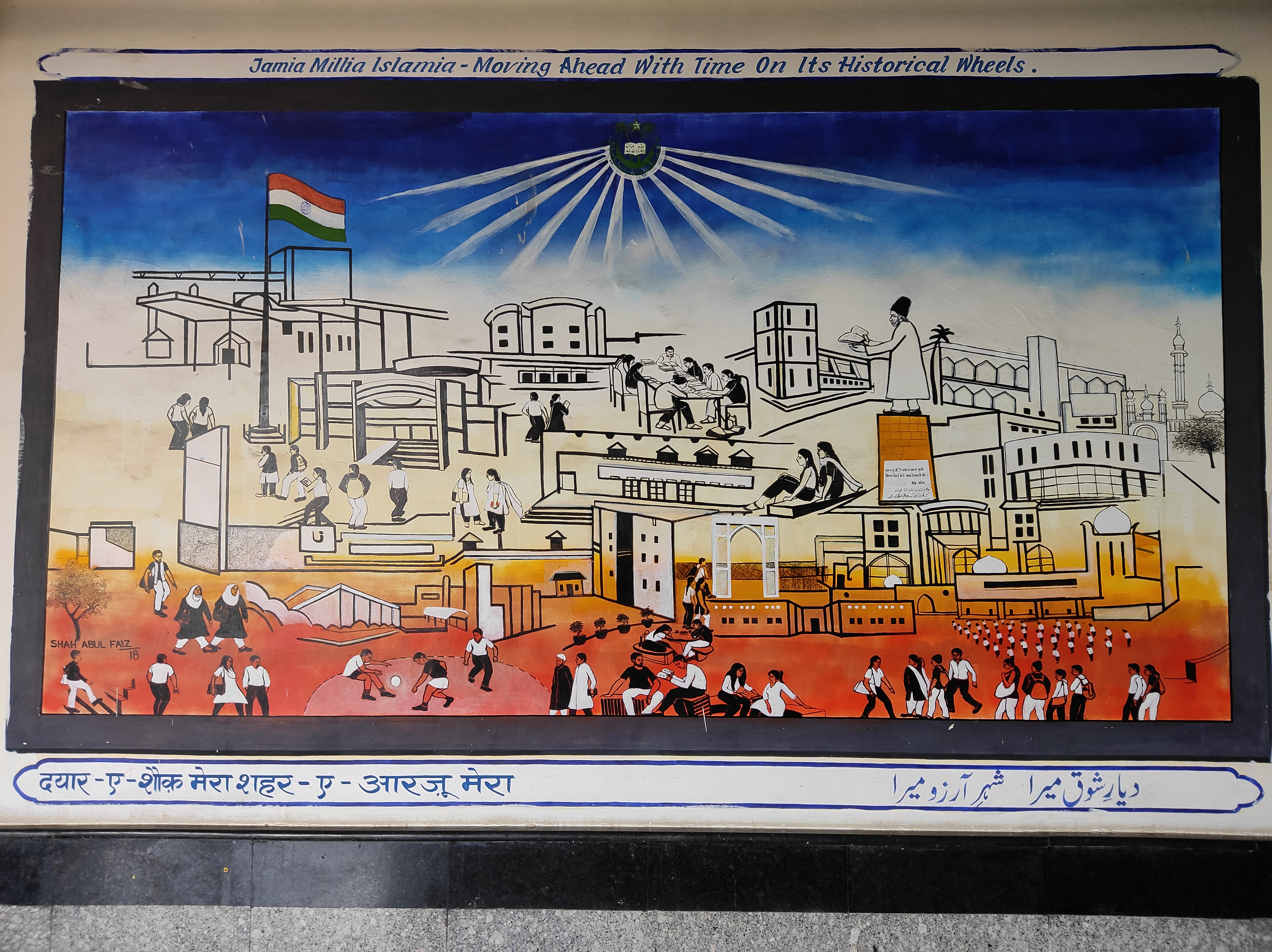
A mural depicting the historical landscape of Jamia Millia Islamia inside the Jamia Millia Islamia metro station.

=== 2019 Jamia Millia Islamia Police Raid ===
In 2019, the university emerged as a center of the Citizenship Amendment Act protests after the act was passed by the Parliament. On 13 December 2019, Delhi Police tried to forcefully dismiss the protest of students and threw tear gas inside the campus on students to control their agitation. On 15 December 2019, police entered the campus on. Many students sustained injuries because of the police brutality and it sparked protests in several other universities.

=== Jamia Millia Islamia student union protests 2026 ===
On 12 October 2026, students in Jamia initiated a protest and hunger strike to demand the restoration of the student union in the university.

== Campus ==
The campus is distributed over a large area in the Okhla area of Delhi. The university's cricket ground, Nawab Mansoor Ali Khan Pataudi Sports Complex, has hosted tournaments and Indian women's cricket matches. This ground also hosted the University Cricket Championship in 2013. Jamia has centers of learning and research, including the Anwar Jamal Kidwai Mass Communication Research Centre (MCRC), Faculty of Engineering & Technology, Faculty of Fine Arts, Centre for Theoretical Physics and the Maulana Mohammad Ali Jauhar Academy of International Studies. Jamia Millia Islamia joined the green campaign and installed 2,250-kilowatt solar panels on the campus. To commemorate 100 years of existence, the existing Gate No. 13 of the university was remodelled and named Centenary Gate, which was inaugurated on university's 103rd foundation day.

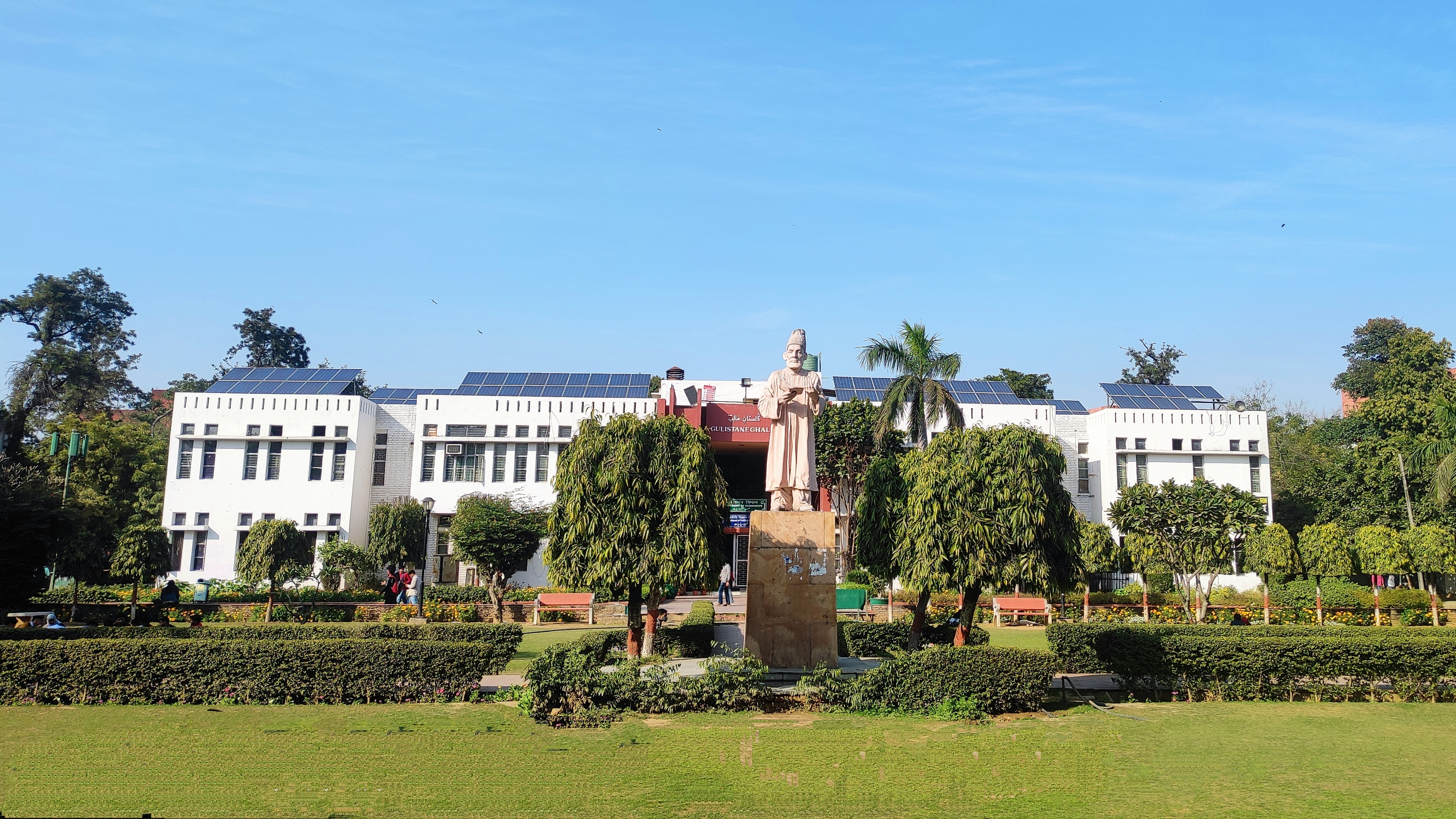
North Campus

Former Vice-Chancellor, Najma Akhtar, at centenary convocation on 23 July 2023 announced that the university has obtained approval from the Central government to establish a medical college.

=== Sports ===
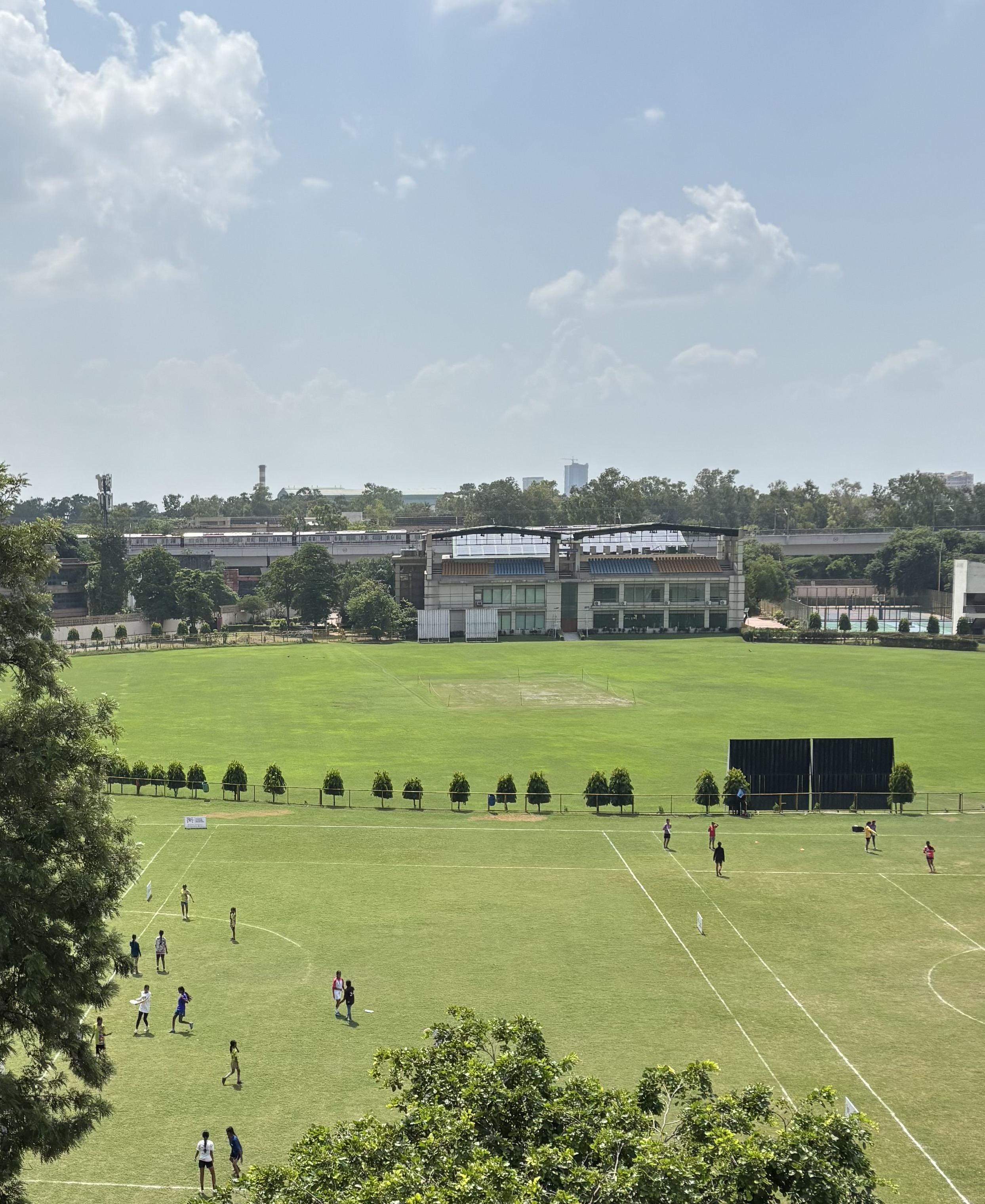
Nawab Mansur Ali Khan Pataudi Sports Complex

Jamia won its first gold and silver medal in wrestling in 1977 at the All India Inter University Championship.

Ranji Trophy and Vijaya Trophy matches are an annual event at the Nawab Mansur Ali Khan Pataudi Sports Complex. In the past, Jamia has hosted Women's Cricket Test matches, Women's World Cup matches and Blind's Cricket World Cup matches. The facilities were used as practice ground for Commonwealth Games as well.

The ground within its periphery also consists of a central indoor games stadium. The sports complex has facilities for: Cricket, Football, Lawn Tennis Court, Volleyball Court, Badminton, Basketball, Jogging Track, Athletics, Table Tennis, Yoga, Snooker Room and Hockey. The Complex is equipped with gymnasium and sports equipment.

=== Library ===
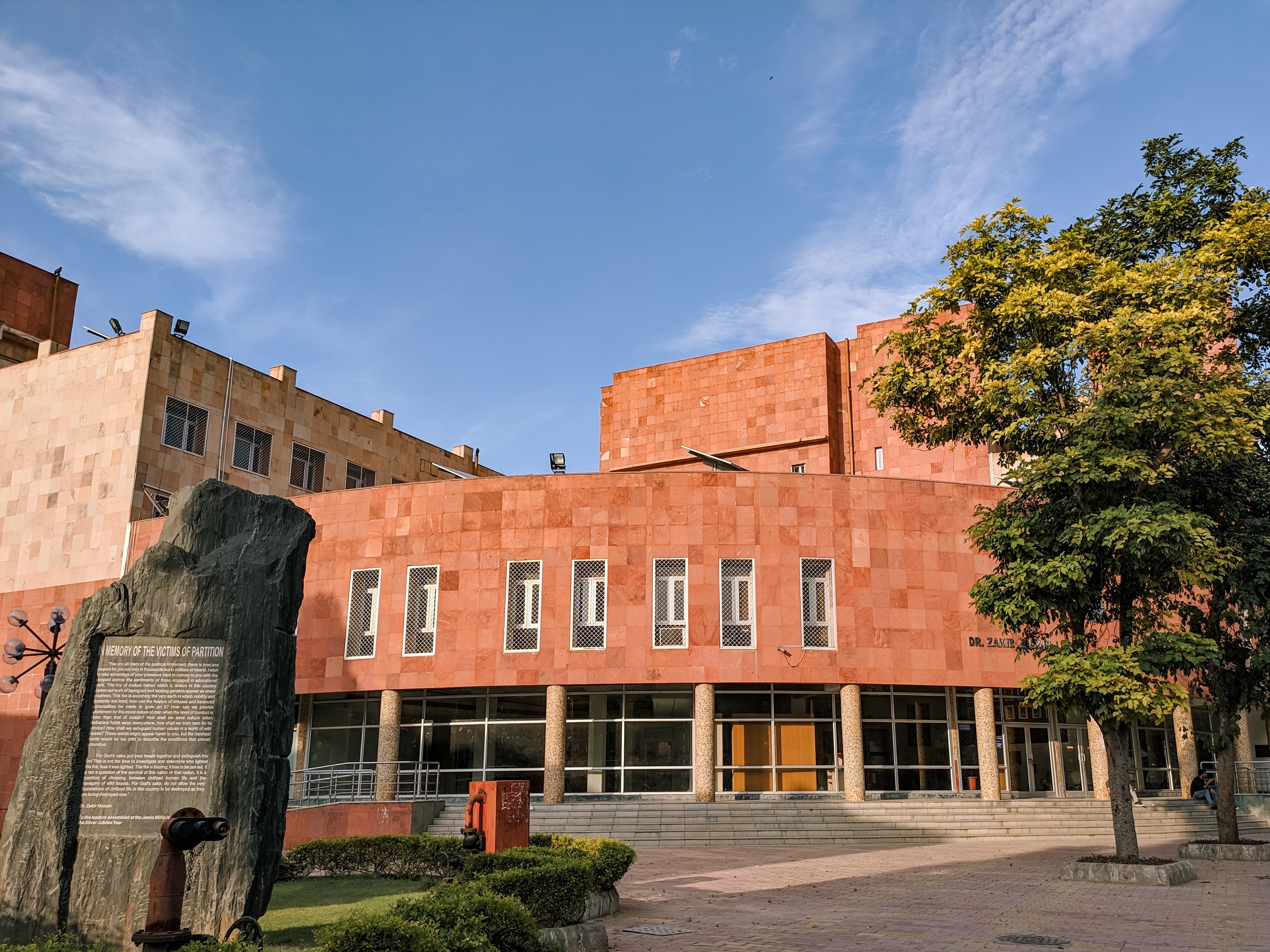
Dr Zakir Husain Library

The University Library System, consisting of a centralized and departmental libraries and archives, has over 600,000 and approximately 143,000 subject-specific books, Urdu book collections; 5000 rare books; and 2230 rare manuscripts. The library subscribes to open access to videos; e-resources; eBooks; e-journals; other academic materials; databases; MOOCs courses. The Digital Resource Centre has 100 workstations as a gateway for online resources and 200 computers for students. The library is open to all students of Jamia Millia Islamia. Besides this, there are subject collection in libraries of some faculties and centres.

=== Health facilities ===
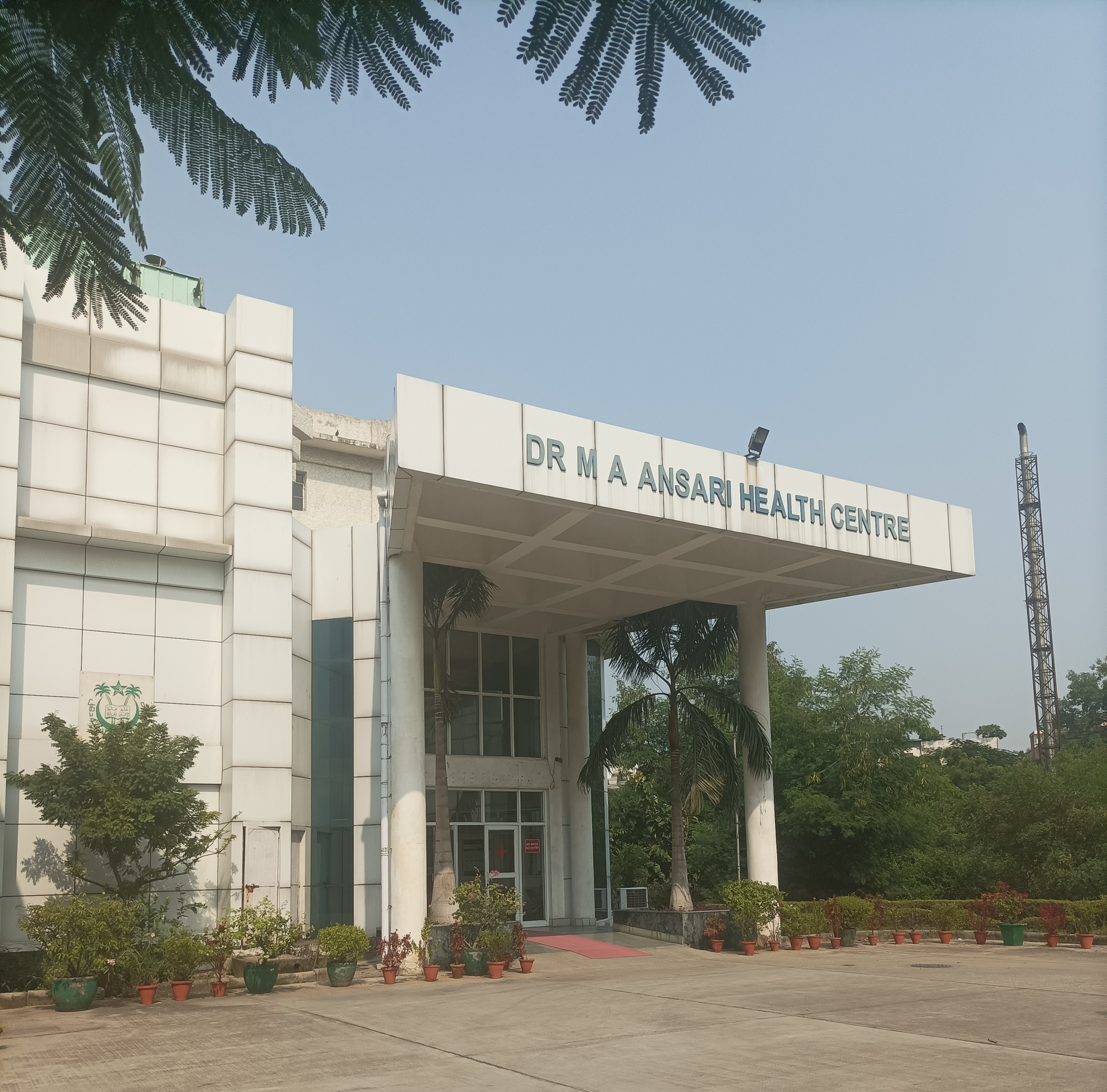
Dr M A Ansari Health Centre

The university provides free medical facilities for students, teaching and non-teaching staff through Ansari Healthcare Centre, Faculty of Dentistry, Centre for Physiotherapy and Rehabilitation Services and Unani Pharmacy.

=== Mosques ===
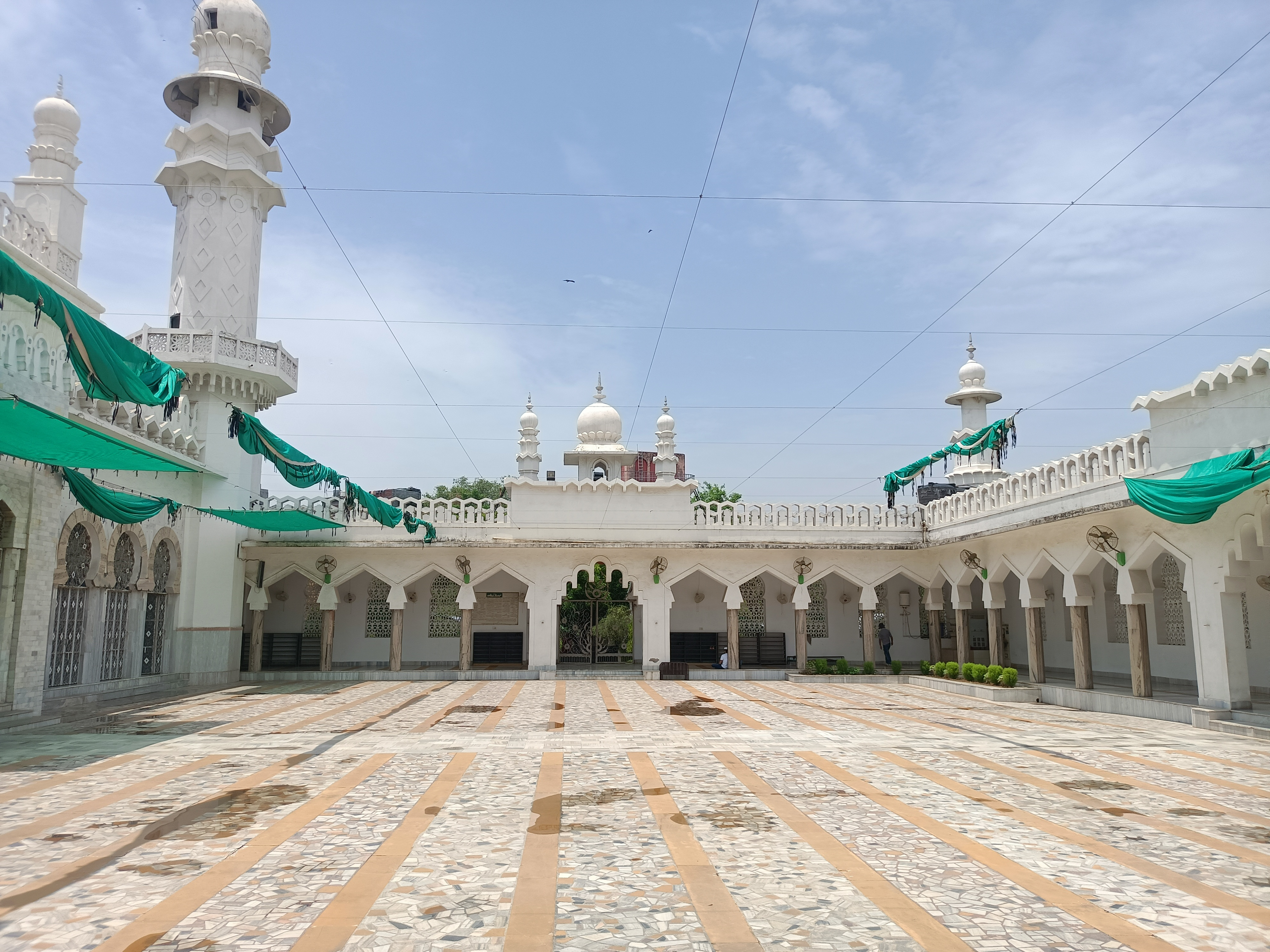
Central Mosque, Jamia Millia Islamia

The campus contains the Central Mosque which is located opposite to the central library and has a capacity of over 1000 people. This mosque is situated on Maulana Mohammad Ali Jauhar Marg, Delhi.

== Organisation and administration ==
=== Governance ===
The governing officials of the university include the Amir-i-Jamia (chancellor), the Shaikh-ul-Jamia (vice-chancellor), the Naib Shaikh-ul-Jamia (Pro-Vice-Chancellor) and the Musajjil (Registrar). The President of India is the Visitor of the university. The Anjuman or University Court is the supreme authority of the university and has the power to review the acts of the Majlis-i-Muntazimah (Executive Council) the Majlis-i-Talimi (Academic Council) and the Majlis-i-Maliyat (Finance Committee). The Executive Council is the highest executive body of the university. The Academic Council is the highest academic body of the university and is responsible for the maintenance of standards of instruction, education and examination within the university.

In 2017, Najma Heptulla was appointed as the Chancellor of Jamia Millia Islamia. In 2019, Najma Akhtar was appointed as the first woman vice-chancellor and served till 12 November 2023. In 2023, Syedna Mufaddal Saifuddin succeeded Najma Heptulla and was appointed as the Chancellor. In 2024, Jawaharlal Nehru University professor Mazhar Asif was appointed as the Vice Chancellor of the university.

=== Faculties ===
Jamia Millia Islamia has eleven faculties under which it offers academic and extension programs.

==== Faculty of Law ====
Established in 1989, the Faculty of Law offered only the three-year LL.B. course until the early 2000s, but started additionally offering the integrated 5 Years B.A. LL.B(Hons.) course for UG students from the academic year 2002–2003. The faculty offers apart from a five-year integrated B.A. LL.B (Hons.) programme, a two-year post-graduate programme (LLM) in three specialised streams (personal law, corporate law and criminal law) and a Ph.D. programme. It also offers two-year Executive LL.M programme for working professionals. JMI offers two Post Graduate Diploma Programmes are PG Diploma in Air Space Law and PG Diploma in Labour Law. The faculty secured the 6th rank among law schools in India as per NIRF Ranking 2024.

==== Faculty of Engineering and Technology ====
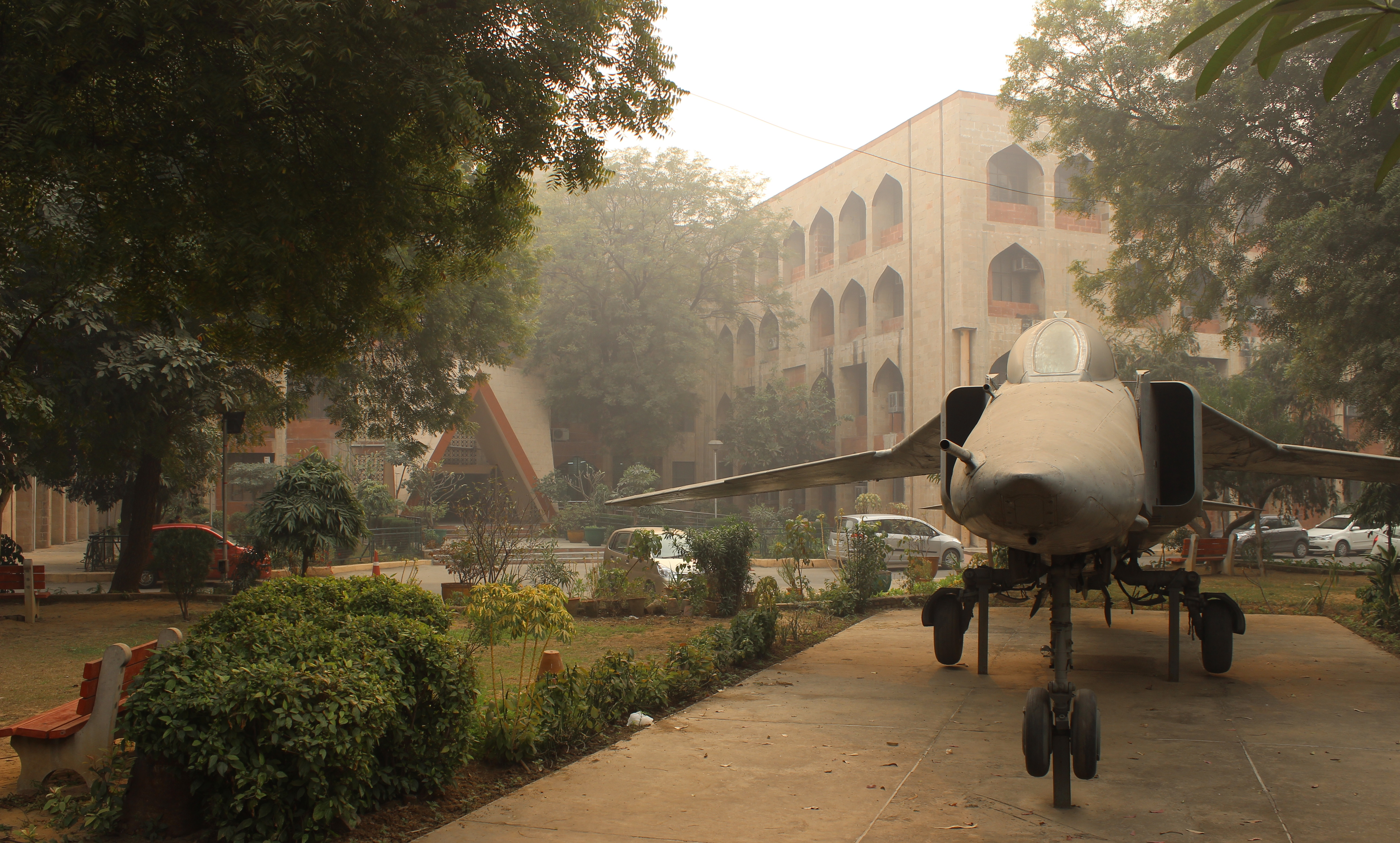
MiG-23, Fighter Jet of the Indian Air Force stands in front of the Faculty of Engineering

The Faculty of Engineering and Technology (FET) was established in 1985. It has several departments offering programmes in PhD, M.Tech., M.Sc., B.Tech. and B.Sc. including Civil Engineering, Mechanical Engineering, Electrical Engineering, Electronics & Communication Engineering, Computer Engineering, Aeronautics, Applied Sciences & Humanities and Environmental Science. They also provide specialization courses for master's degrees such as Artificial Intelligence, Data Sciences, VLSI Design and Technology, Solid State Technology, Environmental Science and Engineering, Earthquake Engineering, Machine Design, Thermal Engineering, Production and Industrial Engineering, Electrical Power Management System, Control & Instrumental System, Electronics, Energy Science and Management, Energy Science and Technology, Environmental Health Risk and Safety Management. In the Times Higher Education Subject Ranking-2024, JMI ranked 401–500 in Engineering and Technology. Within India its rank is 11 among all higher education institutions while among universities it is 2nd position. JMI was placed at 501–600 in computer science, while among Indian Institutions it has been ranked at 16th position and at 7th among Indian universities.

==== Faculty of Architecture and Ekistics ====
Jamia Millia Islamia is the only Central university with a Faculty of Architecture & Ekistics. The architecture program was started in 2001–2002. This Faculty has three departments- Department of Architecture, Department of Planning and Department of Design and Innovation. This faculty which offers two- bachelor degree courses in Bachelor of Architecture (B.Arch) and Bachelor of Design (B.Des), Nine Masters courses, one PG Diploma and PhD. The courses include undergraduate, postgraduate and doctoral studies in subjects such as Architecture, Architecture Pedagogy, Healthcare Architecture, Building Services, Recreational Architecture, Urban Regeneration, Ekistics, Master of Planning (M.Plan) and Master of Design (M.Des). P.G. Diploma in Fire Safety, Lifts and Plumbing Services

==== Faculty of Humanities and Languages ====
This Faculty has nine departments offering programmes in PhD, M Phil (pre-PhD), Postgraduate, Undergraduate, Diploma and Certificate courses.

Department of English, Jamia Millia Islamia

The faculty has departments for Bachelors, Masters and PhD including Arabic, English, Hindi, History and Culture, Islamic Studies, Persian, Iranology, Urdu, Sanskrit and Foreign Languages such as Korean, Japanese, Turkish, German, French and Spanish & Latin American. Sanskrit Department also offers two certificate programmes are Sanskrit and Yoga. Foreign Language Department also offers Certificate, Diploma and Advanced Diploma courses in Pashto, Persian, French, Italian, Spanish, Russian, Portuguese, Turkish, Chinese, Korean and Uzbek. Islamic Studies has been a subject at Jamia Millia Islamia since its inception. It was instituted as a separate department in 1988. The department has been headed by Zayn al-Abidin Sajjad Meerthi. The department publishes an annual magazine, Sada e Jauhar.

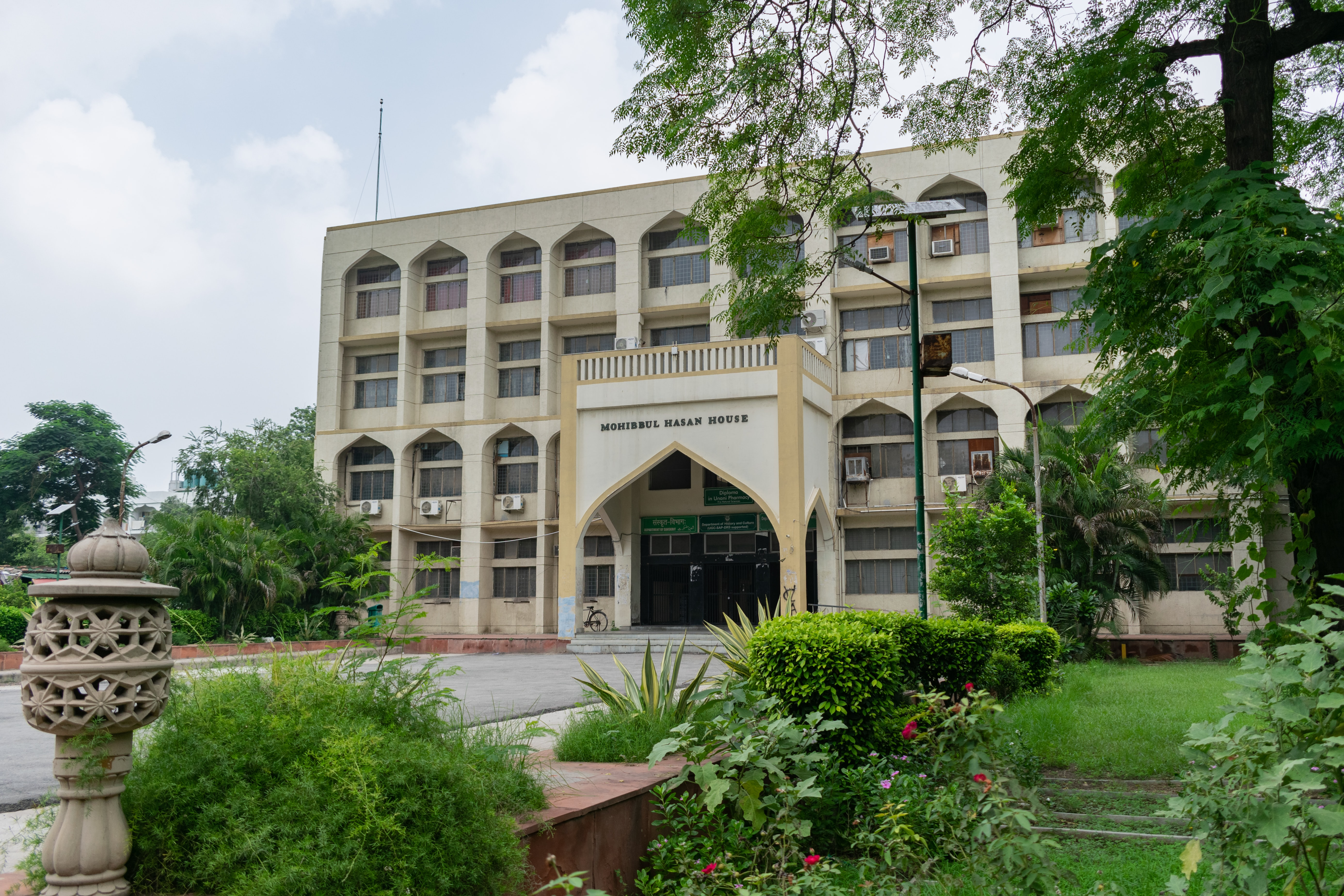
Mohibbul Hasan House

==== Faculty of Fine Arts ====
This Faculty has six departments offering programmes in PhD, Master of Fine Arts (MFA), Bachelor of Fine Arts (BFA), diploma and certificate courses. The subjects taught include Painting, Sculpture, Applied Arts, Art Education, Graphic Art, Art History & Art Appreciation, Curatorial Practices, Art Management and Conceptual Art Practice. Certificate programmes are Design and Innovation, Textile Design, Creative Photography, Calligraphy, Art Appreciation & Art Writing, Art & Aesthetics, and Graphic Art (Print Making) The campus has an art gallery named after the Indian painter M. F. Hussain.

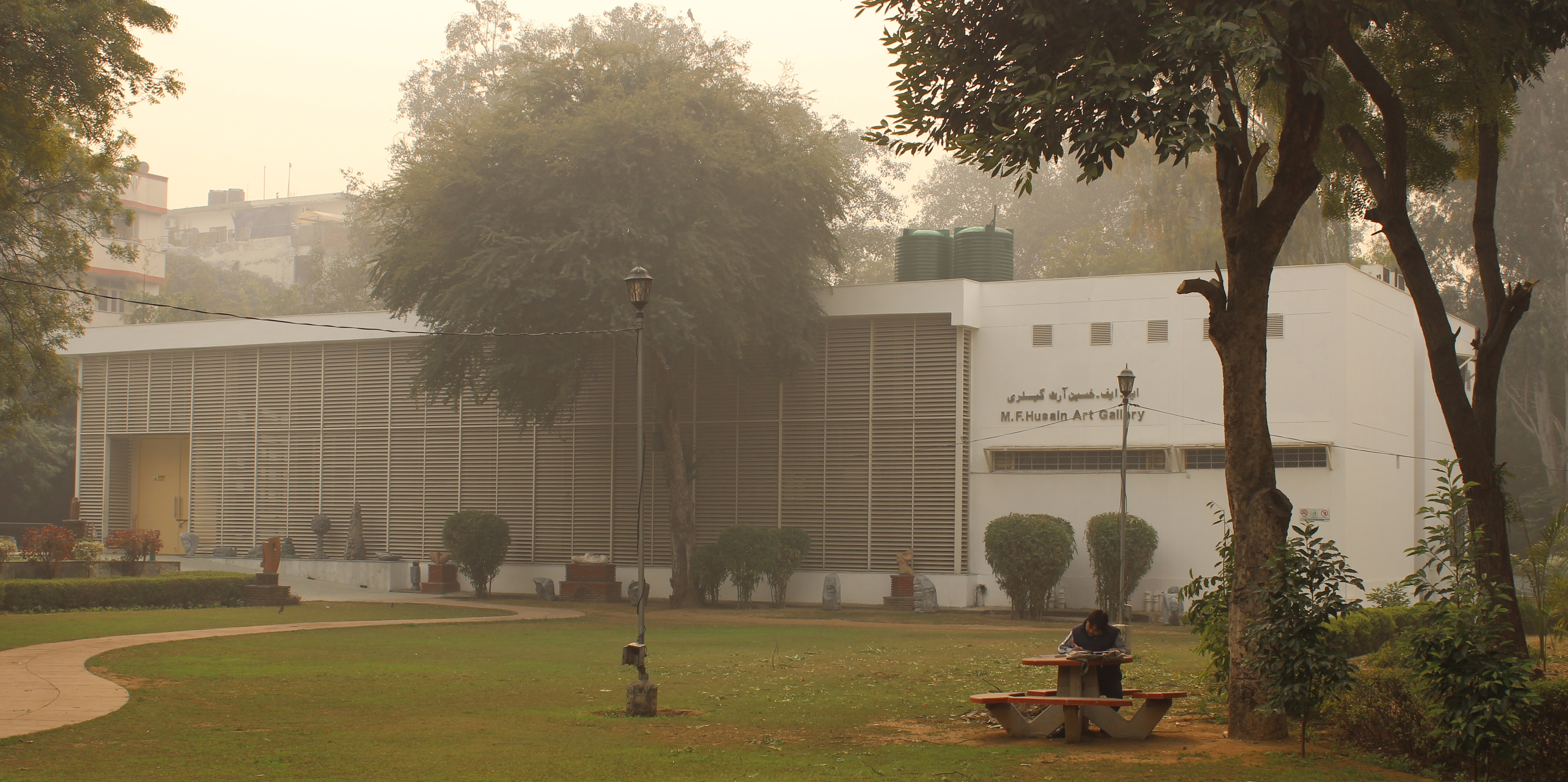
M.F Husain Art Gallery

==== Faculty of Social Sciences ====
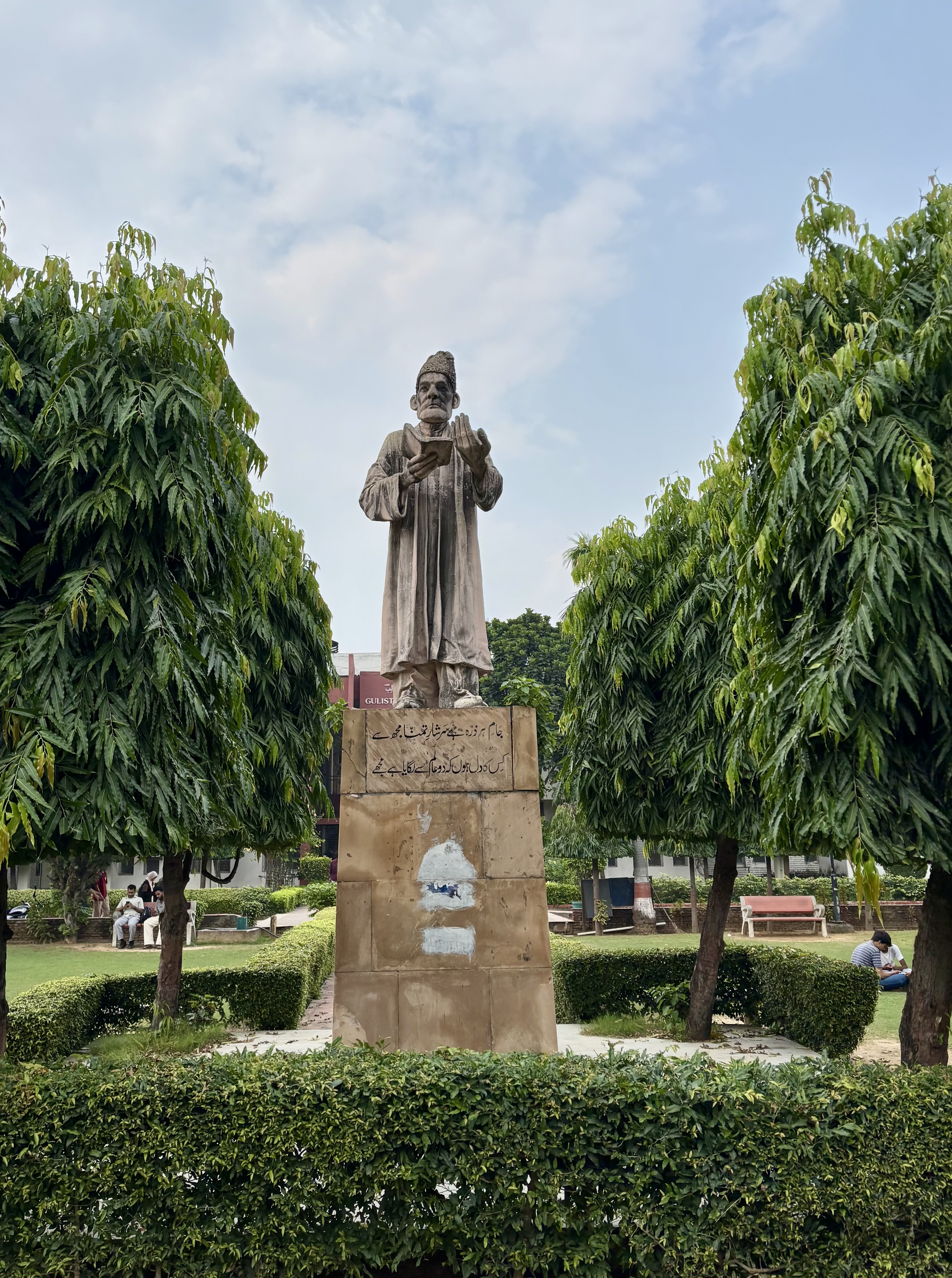
Gulistan-e-Ghalib, which features the statue of Mirza Ghalib

The Faculty of Social Sciences consists of nine departments. These include the departments for Social Sciences, Psychology, Economics, Political Science, Sociology, Social Work, Adult Continuing Education and Extension, Commerce and Business Studies, Library and Information Science.

The Faculty of Social Sciences is based around Gulistan-e-Ghalib and is commonly referred to as the Main Campus.

==== Faculty of Sciences ====
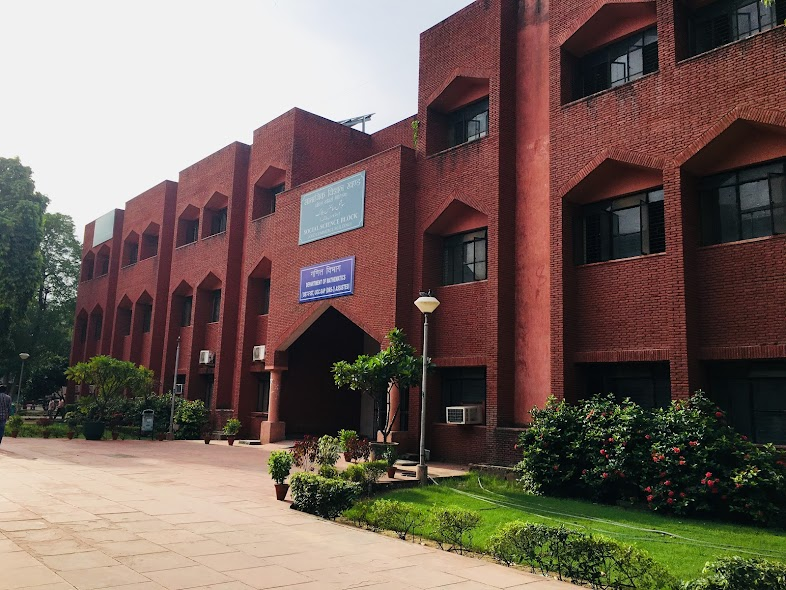
Department of Mathematics

The Faculty of Sciences consists of five departments, Physics, Chemistry, Mathematics, Geography and Computer Science. In addition, there are three associated centres namely FTK- Centre for Information Technology, Centre for Theoretical Physics and Centre for Nanoscience and Nanotechnology.

==== Faculty of Life Sciences ====
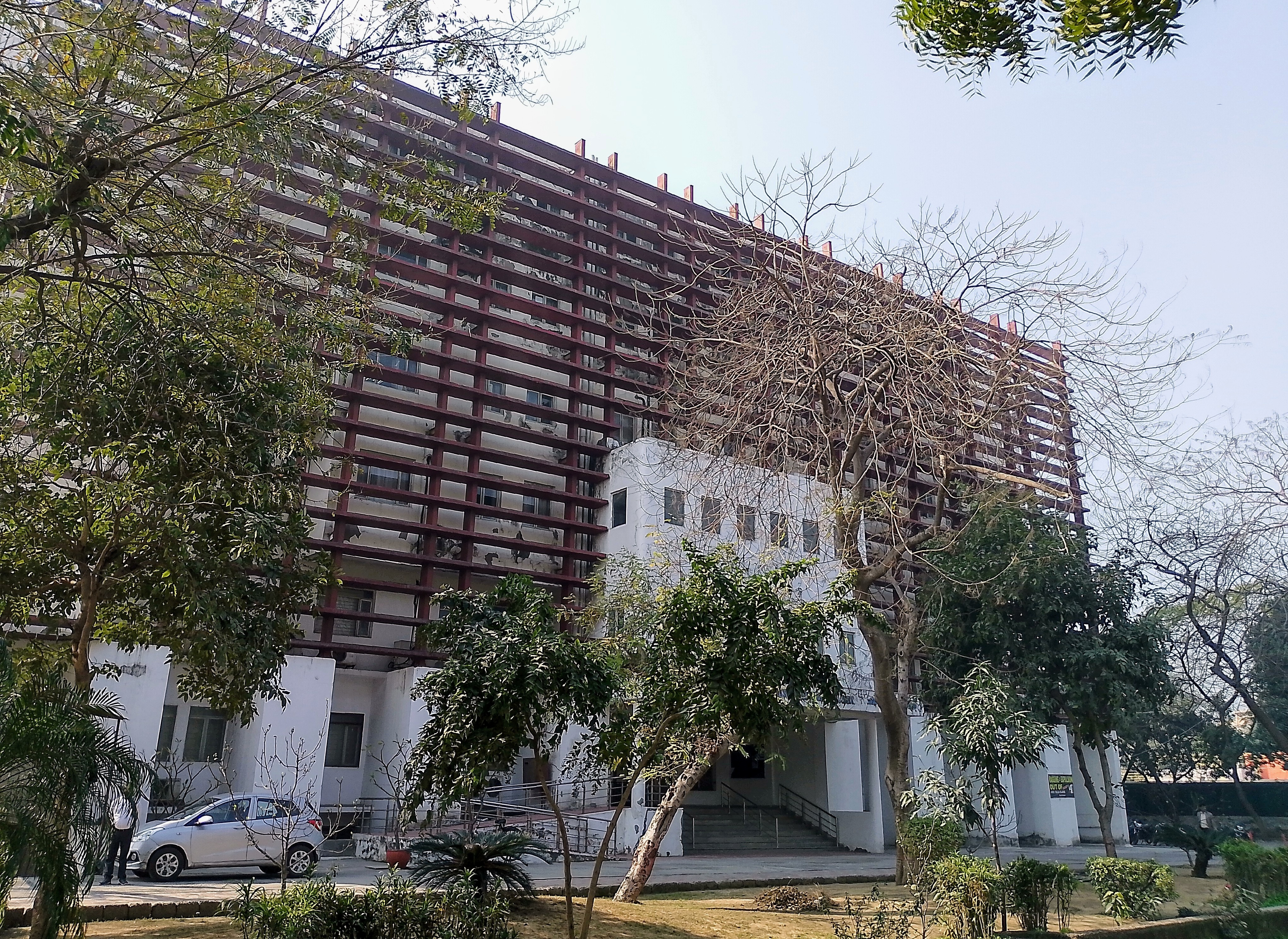
Srinivasa Ramanujan Block, Faculty of Life Sciences

The faculty of Life Sciences, based in Srinivasa Ramanujan Block at Mujeeb Bagh Campus, consists of two departments, Biosciences and Biotechnology, which offers courses in Ph.D., postgraduate, undergraduate and diploma in Unani Pharmacy and Ph.D. Unani Medicine.

==== Faculty of Education ====
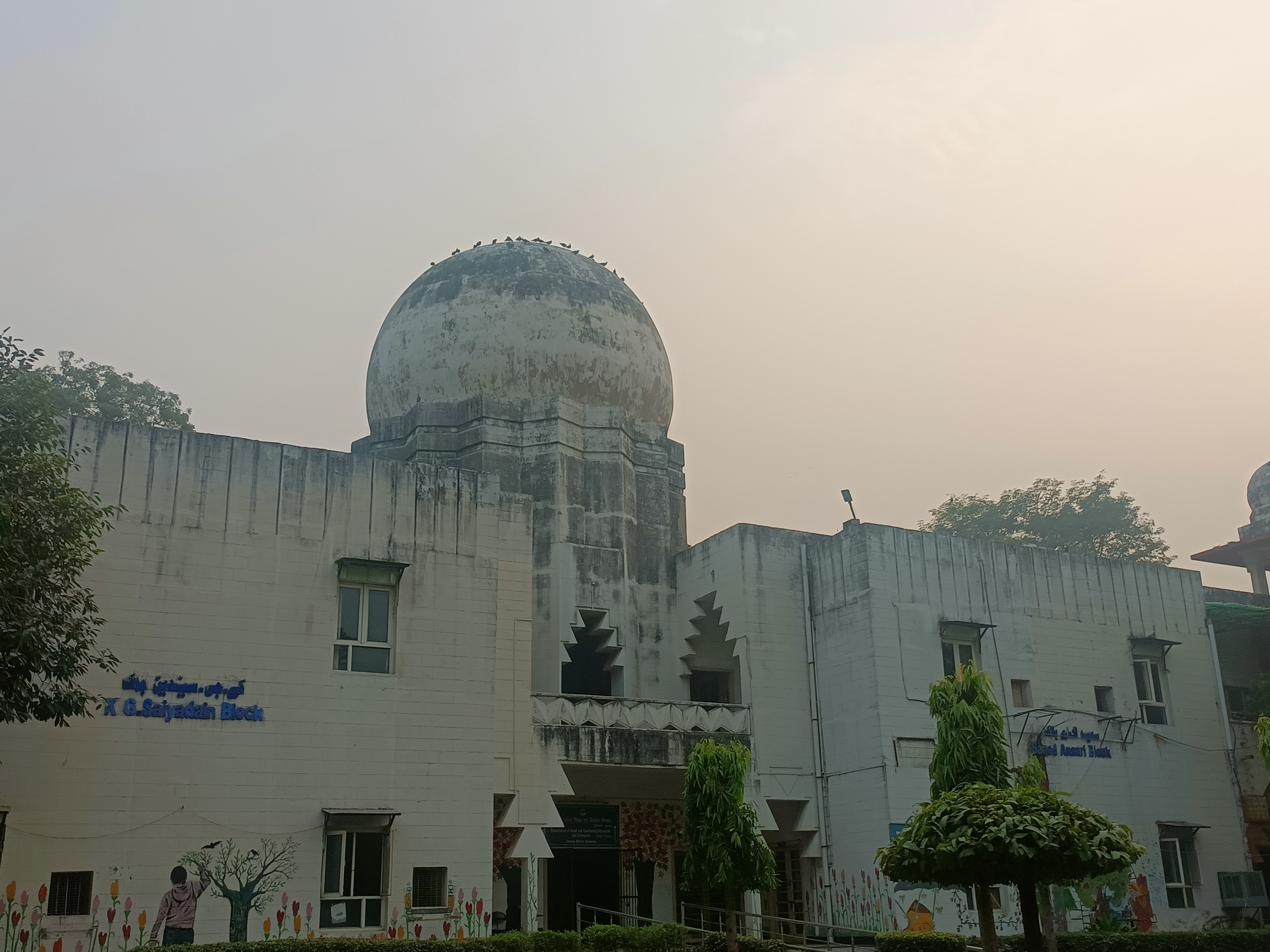
Department of Adult Continuing Education and Extension, TTI

The Teachers’ Training Institute was established in 1938 under the inspiring leadership of Hussain for the purpose of training teachers for Basic Schools according to the scheme of Basic Education. Later, it was renamed as Teachers’ College. The college initiated Teacher Education Programme for Art and Craft Teachers and in Art Education. The Faculty of Education, through its two departments namely Educational Studies and Institute of Advanced Studies in Education, formerly known as the department of Teacher Training and Non-Formal Education runs 12 different programmes including B.Ed., M.Ed., M.A. The Faculty also offers diploma, M.Phil. and Doctoral programme in Education.

==== Faculty of Dentistry ====
This faculty offers B. D. S. programs.

==== Faculty of Management Studies ====
The faculty consists of three departments for Management Studies, Hospital Management & Hospice Studies, and Tourism & Hospitality Management.

=== Centers ===
==== AJK Mass Communication Research Center ====
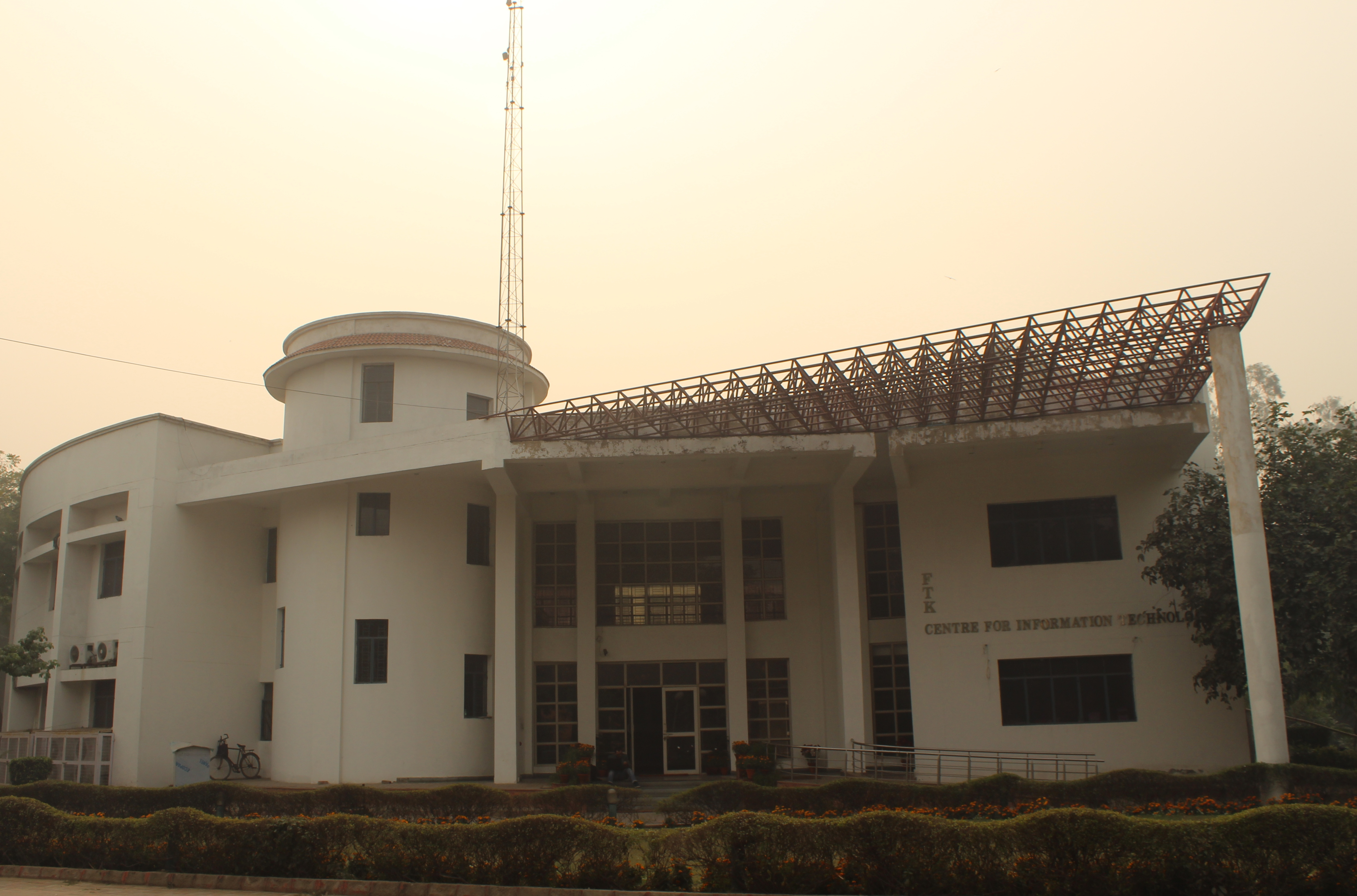
FTK Communication Centre in the campus

The Mass Communication Research Centre was established in 1982 by Anwar Jamal Kidwai, then vice-chancellor (later chancellor) of Jamia Millia Islamia. The centers offers postgraduate courses in Mass Communication. The FTK-Centre for Information Technology provides internet facility for the faculty members, staff, research scholars, and students.

The centre offers courses including Master of Arts courses in Mass Communication, Convergent Journalism, Development Communication, Visual Effect and Animation as well as postgraduate diplomas in, Still Photography and Visual Communication, Acting and Broadcast Technology.

==== Centre for Physiotherapy and Rehabilitation Sciences ====
The centre offers courses including, (B.P.T) Bachelor of Physiotherapy, M.P.T. (Sports), M.P.T. (Orthopaedics), M.P.T. (Neurology), M.P.T. (Cardiopulmonary) and the doctorate in philosophy.

==== Centre for Nanoscience and Nanotechnology ====
The centre aims to promote research in the fields of nanoscience and nanotechnology, with potential applications towards fulfilling national strategic needs. The main research focus of the centre includes nano-fabrication and nano-device, nano-materials and nano-structures, nano-biotechnology and nano-medicine, nano-structure characterization and measurements. Its offers PhD and M.Tech. (Nanotechnology) courses.

==== Centre for Spanish and Latin American Studies ====
The centre offers part-time Certificate, Diploma and Advanced Diploma courses in five languages: French, Spanish, Italian, Portuguese and Russian. It also offers M.Phil/PhD in European Studies and Latin American Studies.

==== MMAJ Academy of International Studies ====
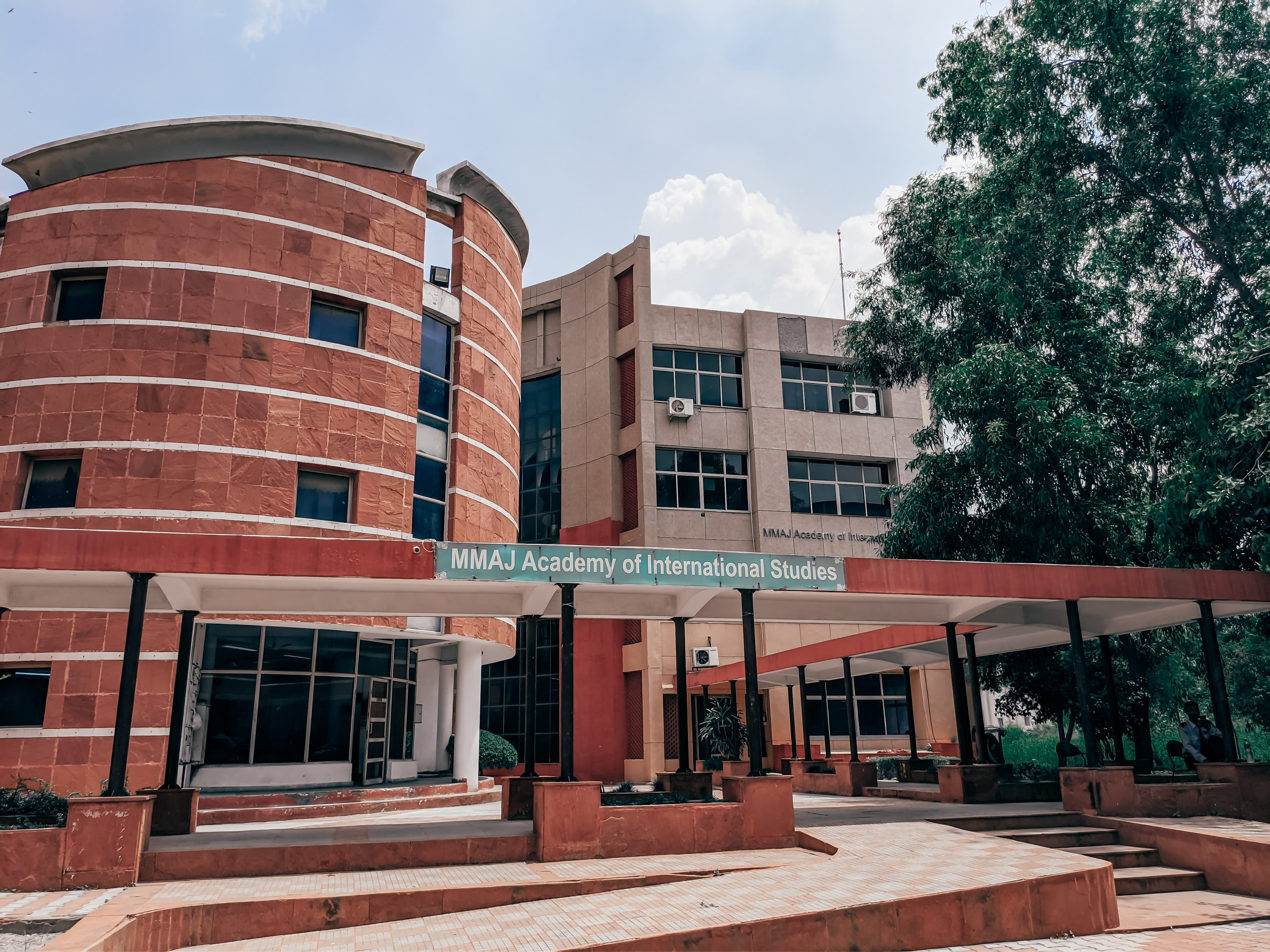
MMAJ Academy of International Studies, Jamia Millia Islamia

Formerly Academy of Third World Studies, MMAJ Academy of International Studies was established in 1988 under the initiative of then Prime Minister Rajiv Gandhi to conduct inter-disciplinary research on social, political and economic issues pertaining to the developing countries. Subsequently, it was renamed after one of the co-founders of Jamia Millia Islamia, Maulana Mohamad Ali Jauhar.

The academy offers M.Phil. and Ph.D. programmes in International Studies, postgraduate courses (Politics: International and Area Studies) and language courses in Uzbek and Chinese. It also has its own library and documentation centre, named after Abid Husain.

=== Other centers ===
Jamia's other academic and non-academic centers include Dr. Zakir Husain Institute of Islamic Studies, Centre for Distance and Open Learning, Nelson Mandela Centre for Peace and Conflict Resolution, Multidisciplinary Centre for Advance Research and Studies (MCARS), Centre for Theoretical Physics, FTK-Centre For Information Technology, Centre for Jawaharlal Nehru Studies, Centre for Comparative Religions and Civilizations, Centre for West Asian Studies, Dr. K.R. Narayanan Centre for Dalit and Minorities Studies, Academy of Professional Development of Urdu Medium Teachers, Centre for North East Studies and Policy Research, India – Arab Cultural Centre, Centre for Culture Media & Governance, Centre for the Study of Social Exclusion and Inclusive Policy, UGC-Human Resource Development Centre, Centre for Coaching and Career Planning, Jamia's Premchand Archives & Literary Centre, Deen Dayal Upadhyay Kaushal Kendra, Sarojini Naidu Centre for Women's Studies, University Counseling & Guidance Centre, Centre for Early Childhood Development and Research and Centre for Innovation and Entrepreneurship (CIE).

=== Schools ===
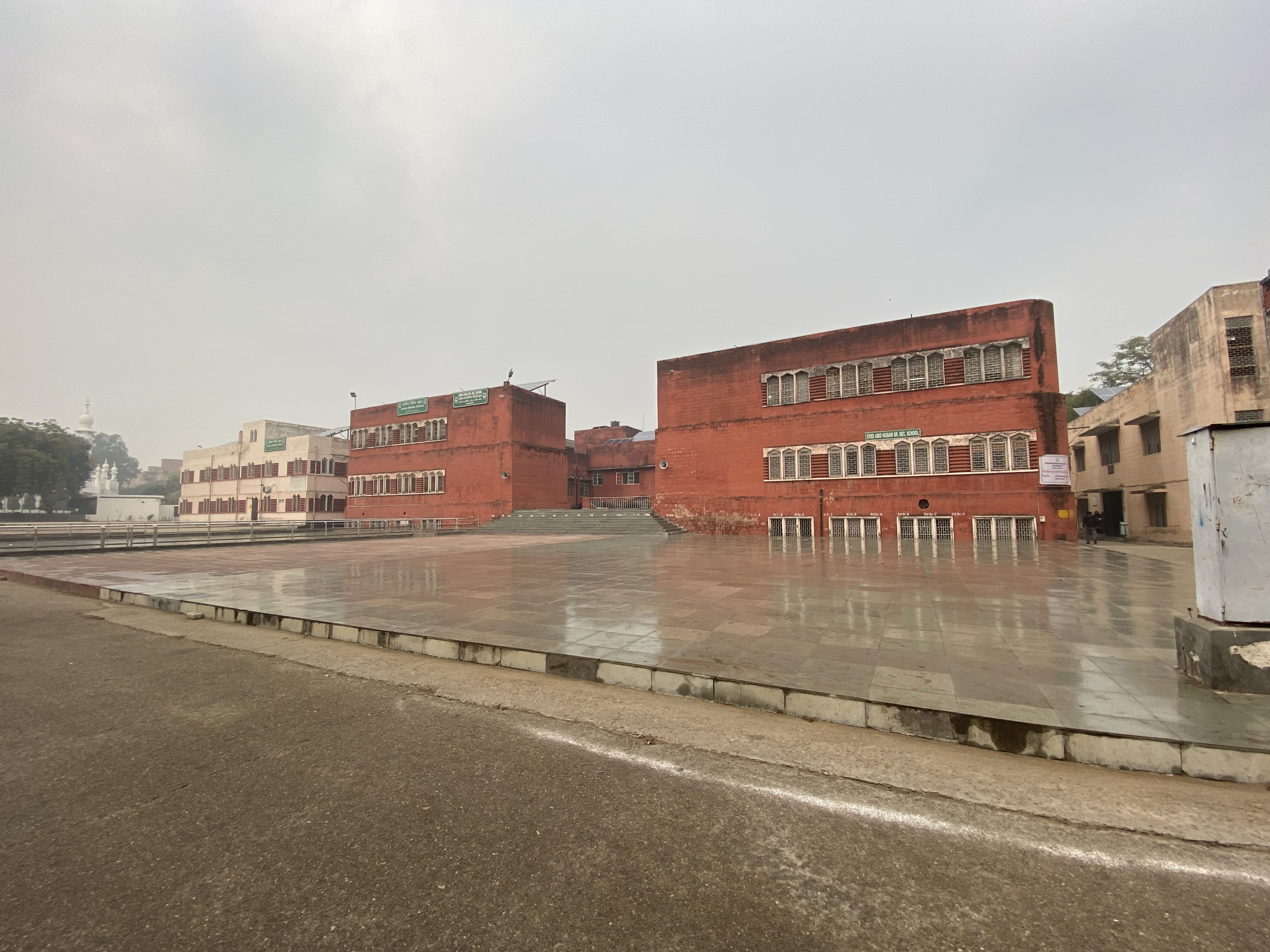
Jamia school buildings in monsoon

Jamia Millia Islamia also imparts education from nursery to senior secondary level. Its schools include:

- Balak Mata Centre
- Gerda Philipsborn Day Care Centre
- Jamia Middle School
- Jamia Senior Secondary School
- Jamia Girls Senior Secondary School
- Mushir Fatma Jamia Nursery School
- Syed Abid Husain Senior Secondary School

== Rankings ==
University rankings

General – international
- QS (World) (2025): 851–900
- QS (Asia) (2024): 206
- Times (World) (2024): 501–600
- Times (Asia) (2024): 148
- Times (Emerging) (2022): 172

General – India
- NIRF (Overall) (2024): 13
- NIRF (Research) (2024): 19
- NIRF (Universities) (2024): 3
- Outlook India (Universities) (2020): 12

Engineering – India
- NIRF (2024): 24

Law – India
- NIRF (2024): 6

Business/Management – India
- NIRF (2024): 25

Architecture – India
- NIRF (2024): 7

Dental – India
- NIRF (2024): 8

Internationally, Jamia Millia Islamia was ranked 851–900 in the QS World University Rankings of 2025 and 206 in Asia in 2024. It was ranked 501–600 in the world by the London-based Times Higher Education World University Rankings of 2024, 148 in Asia in 2024 and 172 among emerging economies in 2022. In 2024, Jamia Millia Islamia was ranked 256 out of 1169 universities worldwide in the Moscow-based Round University Ranking. According to U.S. News & World Report 2024-2025, Jamia Millia Islamia is ranked 718 in Best Global Universities and 205 in Asia and 8 in India.

Nationally, Jamia Millia Islamia has held 3rd rank as a university since 2022 but held 4th in the year 2025 and was ranked 13th in India overall by the National Institutional Ranking Framework (NIRF) in 2024, 6th in law ranking, 7th in architecture ranking, 8th in the dental ranking, 24th in the engineering ranking, 19th in research institutes and 25th in the management ranking.

JMI was ranked third among universities in the country by the National Institutional Ranking Framework (NIRF) in 2024.

== Cultural Festival ==
Jamia Millia Islamia organizes various cultural festivals including the annual festival. The university organises Talimi Mela on its Foundation Day of 29 to 30 October every year.

Jamia has also the legacy of celebrating national cultural festival called MiRAAS. It was initiated by Dean Students of Welfare where various cultural and competitive events were organised by the students. It has not been organised since 2017.

== Alumni ==
Since its inception, Jamia Millia Islamia has produced alumni across various disciplines, including, Rahimuddin Khan, Shah Rukh Khan, Kabir Khan, Mouni Roy, Arfa Khanum Sherwani, Barkha Dutt, Anjana Om Kashyap, Ampareen Lyngdoh, Kunwar Danish Ali, Tabish Mehdi, Virendar Sehwag, Imran Raza Ansari, Danish Siddiqui and Mohammad Najeeb Qasmi.

== See also ==
- Distance Education Council
- Education in Delhi
- Education in India
- List of universities in India
- Universities and colleges in India
