= Mazhar Asif =

Indian academic administrator

16th Vice-Chancellor of Jamia Millia Islamia
- Incumbent
- Assumed office 24 October 2024
- Chancellor: Mufaddal Saifuddin
- Preceded by: Najma Akhtar

Personal details
- Born: 2 January 1971 (age 55) Lahasaniya, Bihar, India
- Education: Jawaharlal Nehru University

Mazhar Asif (born 2 January 1971) is an Indian academic administrator and scholar, with a focus on Indian medieval history and Sufism. He has been serving as the Vice-Chancellor of Jamia Millia Islamia since 24 October 2024. An alumnus of Jawaharlal Nehru University, he has formerly served as a Professor at his alma mater, and as a member of the drafting committee for National Education Policy 2020.

== Early life and education ==
Asif was born on January 2, 1971, in Lahasaniya village, located within the Patahi police station area in the East Champaran district. He received his post-graduation and doctoral degrees from Jawaharlal Nehru University (JNU). During his time as a student at JNU, he was a member of the Akhil Bharatiya Vidyarthi Parishad (ABVP), an organization affiliated with the RSS. His studies focused on Indian medieval history and Sufism.

== Career ==
Asif taught at Gauhati University between 1996 and 2017 and then joined the JNU's Centre of Persian and Central Asian (CPCA) Studies. He served as the dean of the School of Language Literature and Culture Studies from 2021 to 2023. In 2017, the JNU Teachers' Association (JNUTA) challenged his appointment to JNU in the Delhi High Court. He later became a member of JNU Teachers' Federation which formed in 2019 against JNUTA. At JNU, he served for the university's School of Arts and Aesthetics in the capacity of an acting dean in 2018, and as the dean of CPCA in 2020. In 2020, the Jawaharlal Nehru University Students' Union (JNUSU), accused him and several other faculty members of inciting violence in the university campus; the violence left over 30 students injured.

Asif is a member of National Assessment and Accreditation Council's peer-review team, and associated with the National Monitoring Committee for Education. He served as a member of the drafting committee, and as a chairman of the implementation committee for the National Education Policy 2020.

On 24 October 2024, the President of India Droupadi Murmu, appointed him the vice-chancellor of Jamia Millia Islamia for a period of five years. At the time of his appointment to Jamia, he served as a professor at Centre for Persian & Central Asian Studies, at JNU. He has been a member of the executive council of both his alma mater, JNU, and the Maulana Azad National Urdu University, and contributed to National Institute of Open Schooling and the National Council for Promotion of Urdu Language in leadership positions.

== Publications ==
Asif has compiled a comprehensive Persian-Assamese-English dictionary. He has a total of nine books in Assamese, English and Persian languages, to his credit, including:

- Aitihasic Patabhumit Asomor Aitijyamandita Islamdharmi Sakal (transl. History of Assamese Muslims)
- Tarikh-e-Aasham
- Literature, culture, and language education : with special reference to North-East India
