= Eduard Spranger =

German philosopher and psychologist (1882–1963)

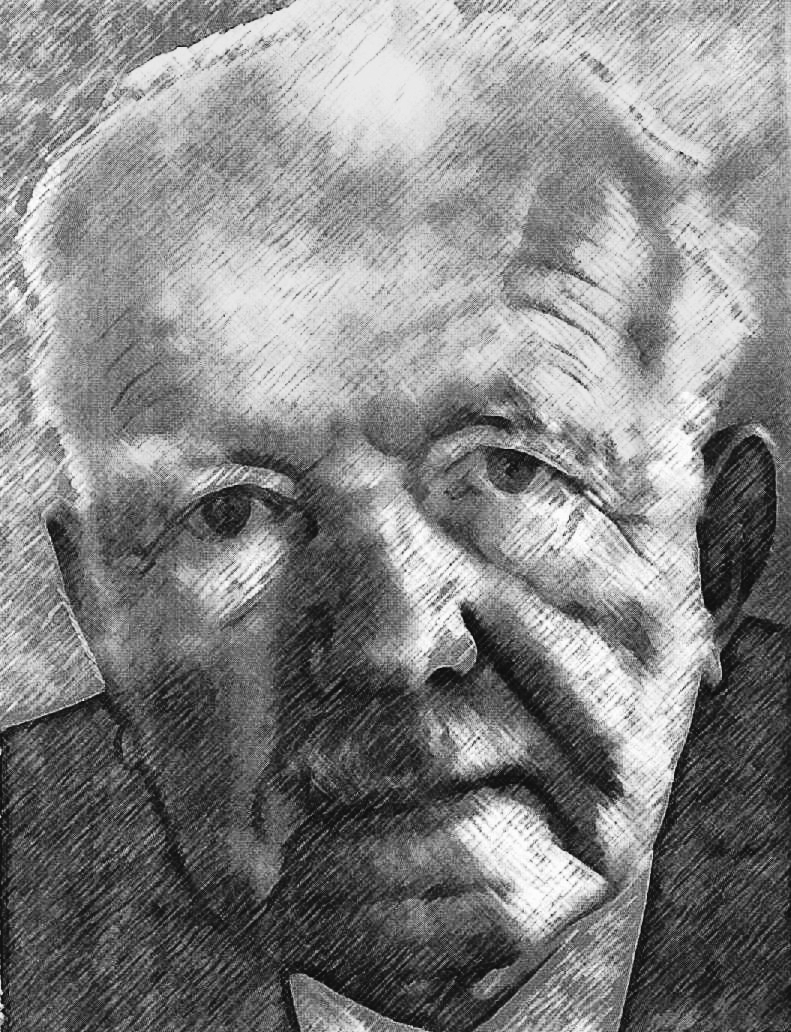
- A sketch of Eduard Spranger.
- Born: 27 June 1882; Berlin, German Empire
- Died: 17 September 1963 (aged 81); Tübingen, West Germany
- Occupations: Philosopher, psychologist

Eduard Spranger (German: [ˈʃpʁaŋɐ]; 27 June 1882 – 17 September 1963) was a German philosopher and psychologist. A student of Wilhelm Dilthey, Friedrich Paulsen and Carl Stumpf, Spranger was considered a humanist who developed a philosophical pedagogy as an act of 'self-defense' against the psychology-oriented experimental theory of the times.

== Thought ==
Spranger's 1914 book Lebensformen (translated as Types of Men) had sold 28,000 copies by the end of 1920. He argued that forms of human life are structures of consciousness, and that personality has a biological basis but cannot be explained by biology alone. As he put it, "On a higher level, the historical, for instance, the soul participates in objective values which cannot be deduced from the simple value of self-preservation." He criticized attempts to reduce the psyche and society to abstract scientific elements. For Spranger, mind is holistic: "everything is part of everything else," and the "totality of mind is present in every act." The quantitative measurement of sensations, reflexes, and memories, he argued, cannot by itself capture the meaningful whole of lived experience.

Spranger's six value orientations, which also informed his approach to personality and pedagogy, were:

- The Theoretical, whose dominant interest is the discovery of truth
- The Economic, who is interested in what is useful
- The Aesthetic, whose highest value is form and harmony
- The Social, whose highest value is love of people
- The Political, whose interest is primarily in power
- The Religious, whose highest value is unity

== Students ==
Indian educator and philosopher Syed Abid Husain did his doctoral studies with Spranger at the University of Berlin.
