= Vivaha Panchami =

Hindu festival

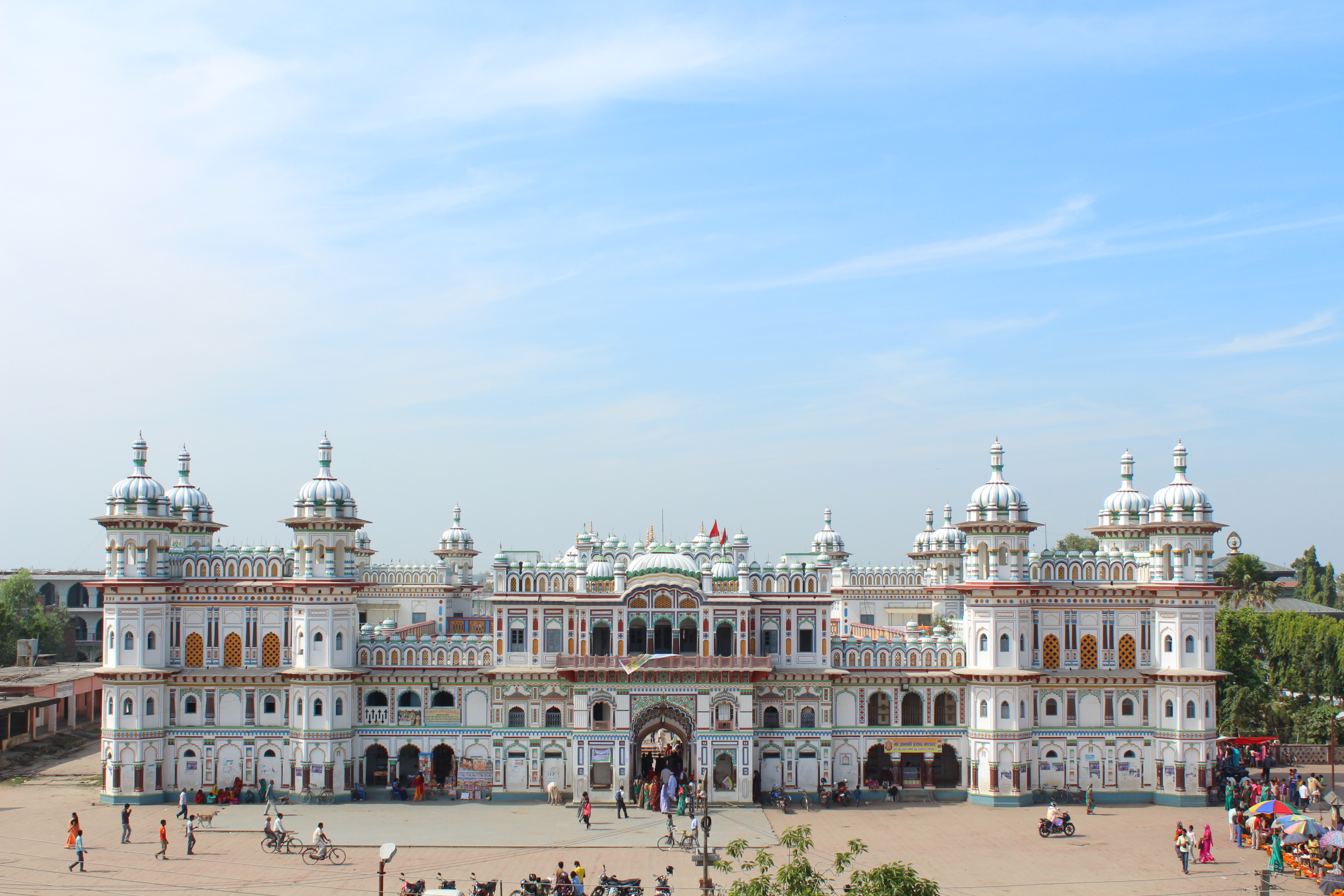
- Janaki Mandir, Janakpur
- Observed by: Hindus
- Type: Hindu
- Significance: Wedding anniversary of Rama and Sita
- Observances: In Jankpur, a symbolic marriage ceremony is held.; In other places, Worshipping and paying homage to Ram and Sita.
- Date: fifth day of the Shukla paksha of Mangsir month of the Hindu calendar
- Frequency: Annual

Vivaha Panchami (Sanskrit: विवाहपञ्चमी, romanized: Vivāhapañcamī) is a Hindu festival celebrating the wedding of Rama and Sita in Janakpurdham which was the capital city of Mithila. It is observed on the fifth day of the Shukla paksha or waxing phase of moon in the month of Agrahayana (November – December) in the Bikram Samvat, calendar also known as Mangsir. The day is observed as the Vivaha Utsava of Sita and Rama in temples and sacred places associated with Rama, such as the Mithila region of India and Nepal and Ayodhya in India.

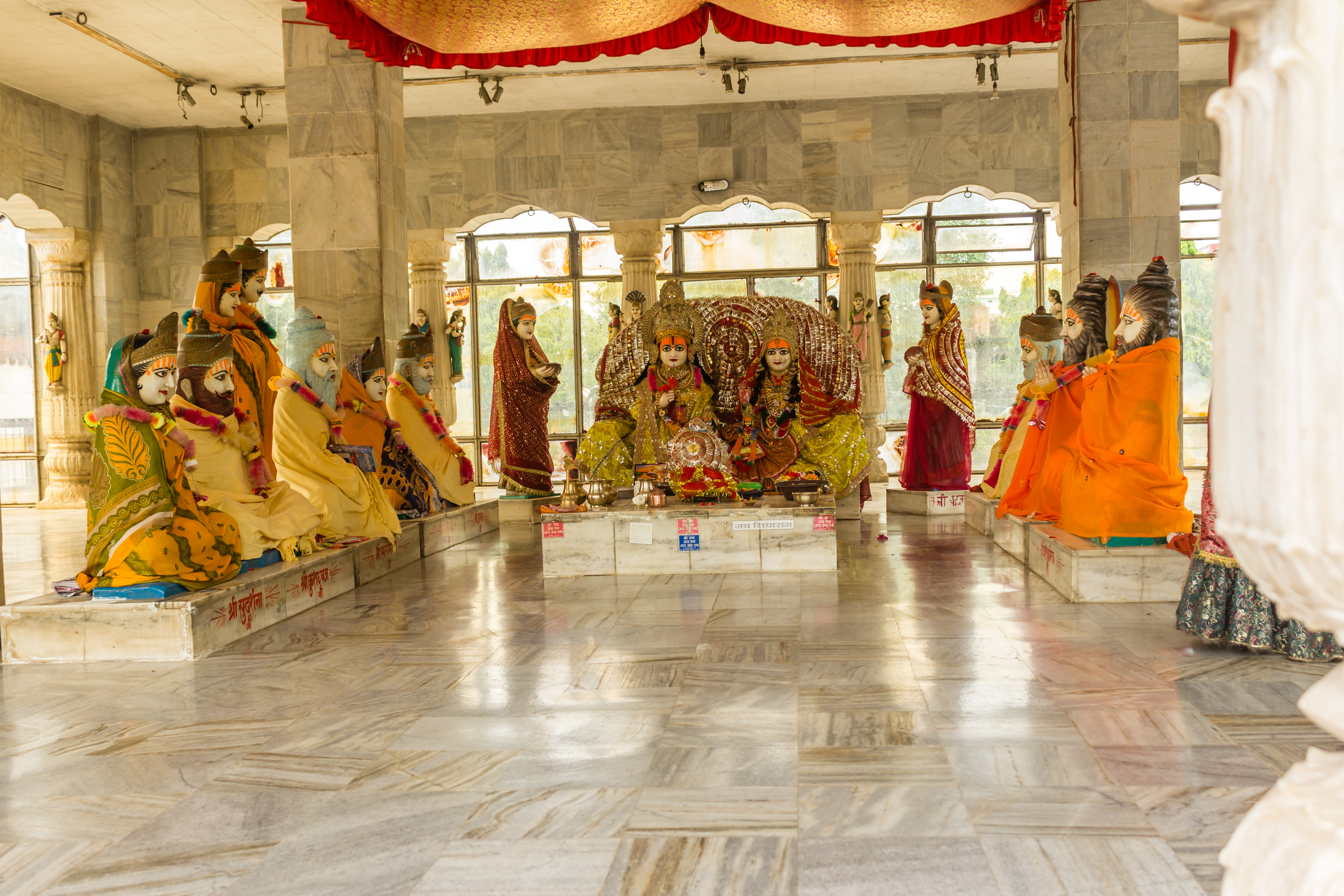
Inside view of Vivah Mandap, Janakpur

== Observances ==
The day is of great importance at Janakpurdham and Vivah Mandap in Janakpur, Nepal, where thousands of pilgrims along with Ram Baraat Yatra arrive many from India and from other part of the country, as it is mentioned in the Ramayana that Sita married Rama here.

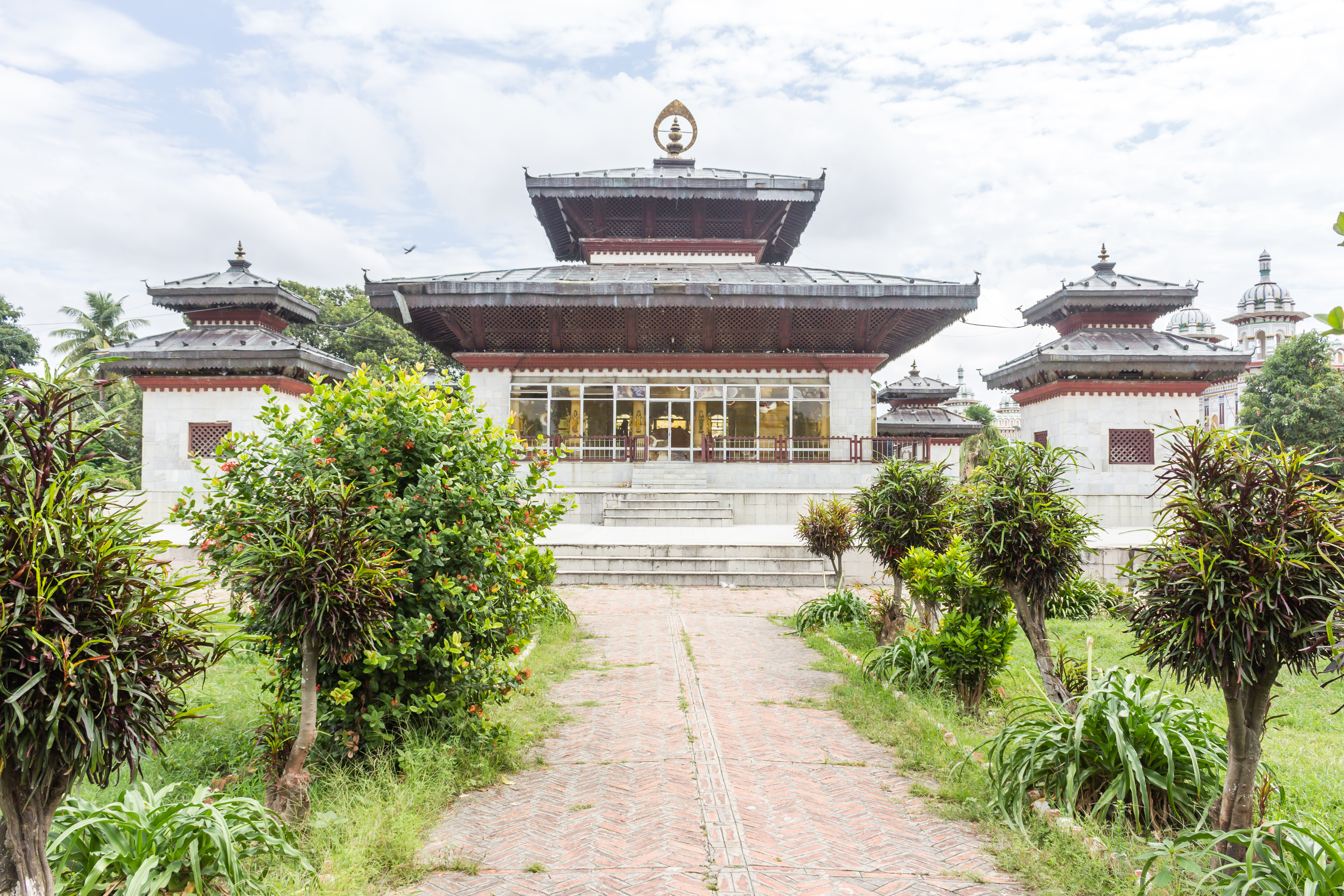
Vivah Mandap, Janakpur

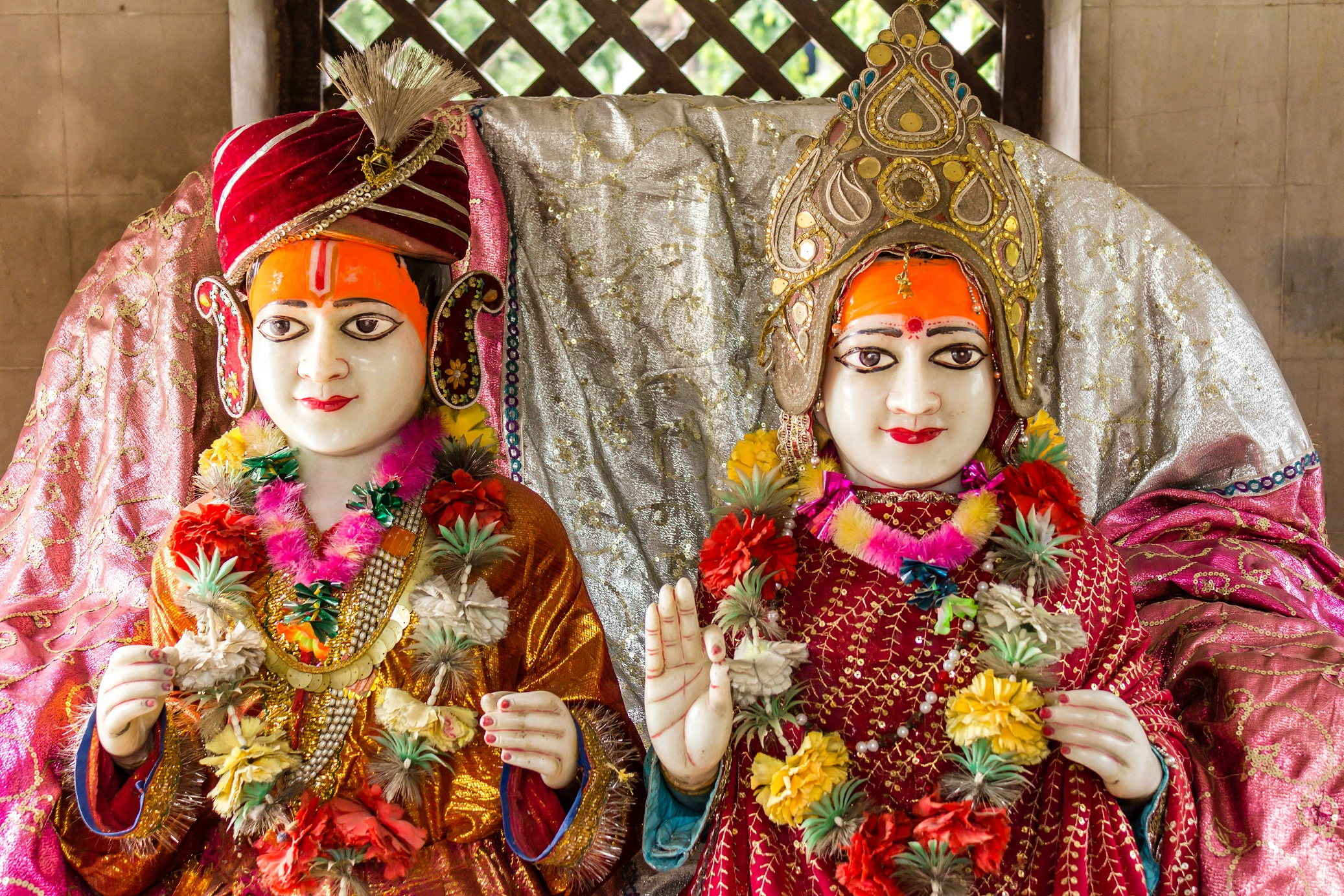
Idols of Lord Rama and Mata Sita in Vivah Mandap

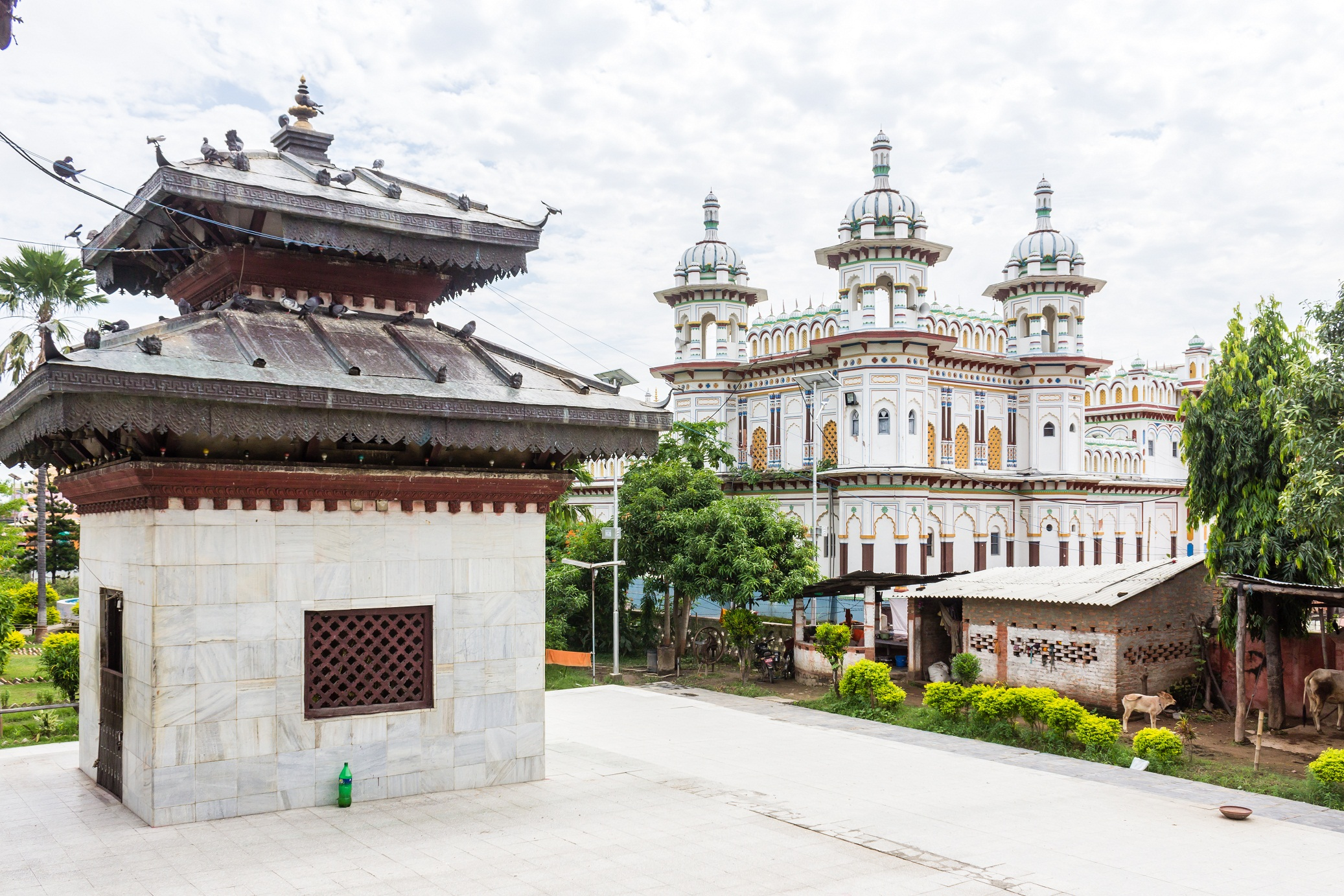
Vivah Mandap view with Janakpur Dham

In the year 2025, a grand sacred ceremony of Ram Dhwajarohan was organised in the premises of the Ram Janmabhoomi Mandir in Ayodhya on the occasion of Vivah Panchami. In the ceremony, the prime minister Narendra Modi of India hoisted Rama's sacred Dharma Dhwaja on the top peak of the temple.

== See also ==
- Rama Navami
- Mithila
- List of Hindu festivals
- Devashila Yatra
- Ram Janaki Path
- Mithila Jhulnotsav
- Barah Bigha
