= Janakpur =

Capital of Nepal's Madhesh Province

Janakpur जनकपुरधाम
- Sub-Metropolitan City
- Janakpurdham
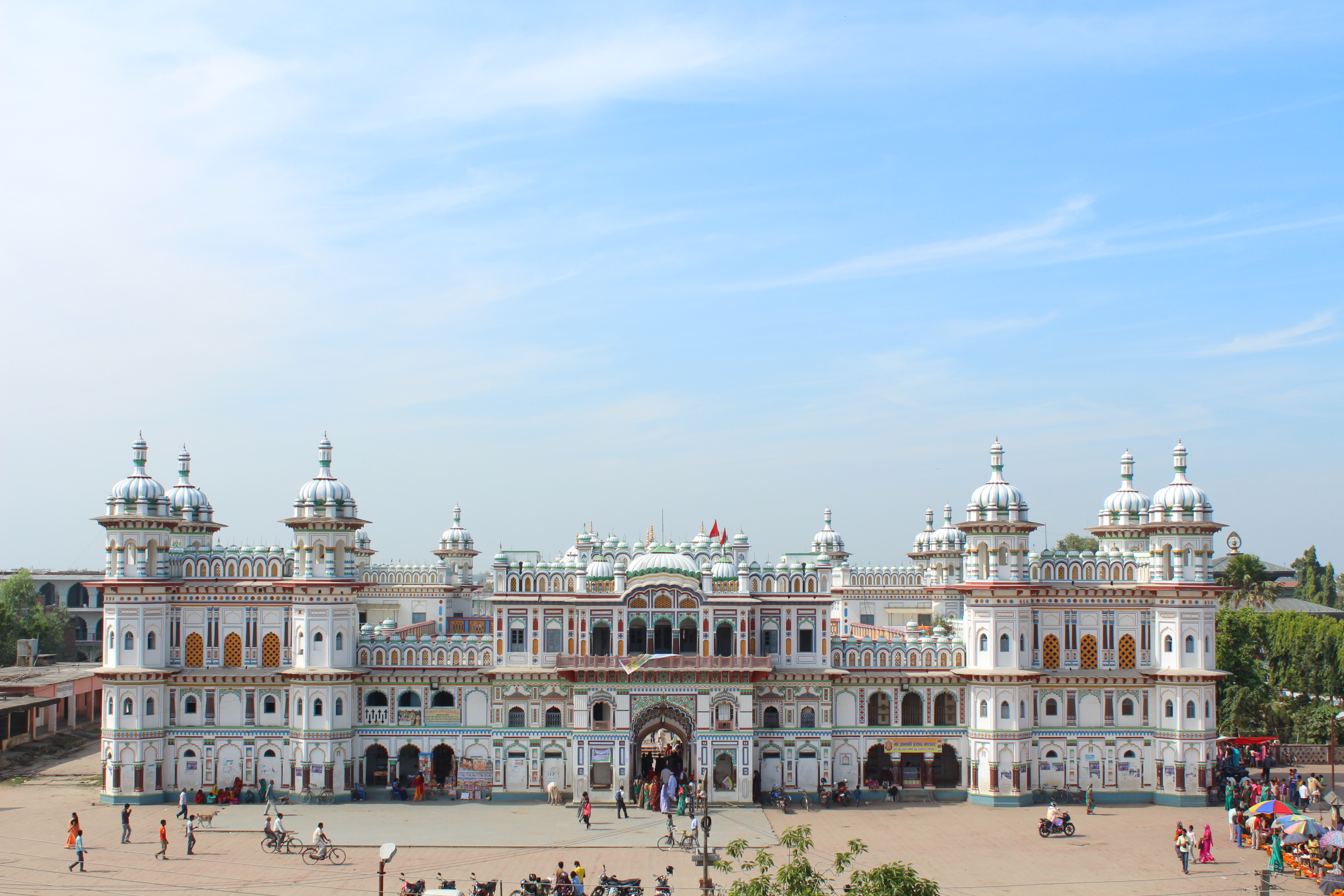
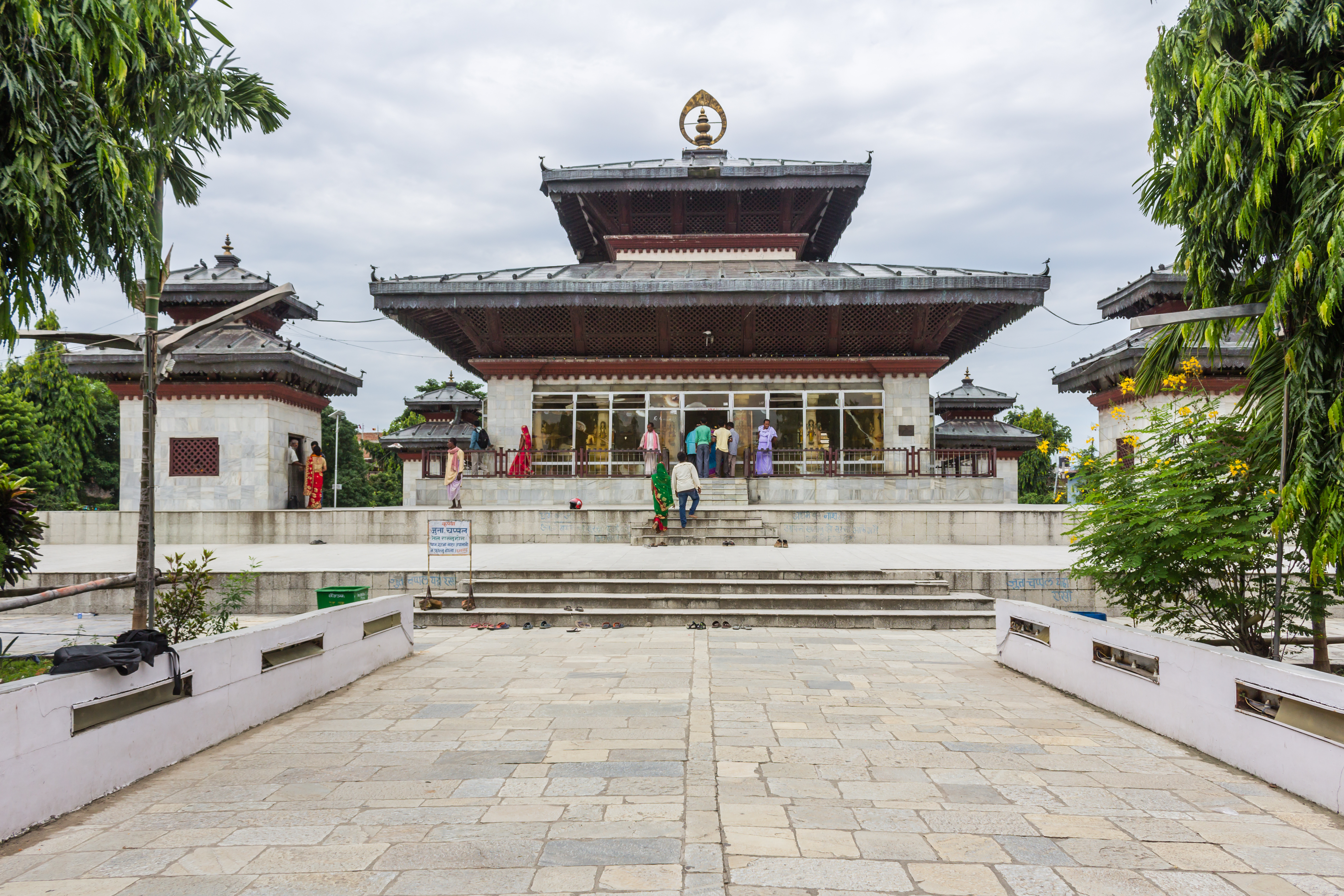
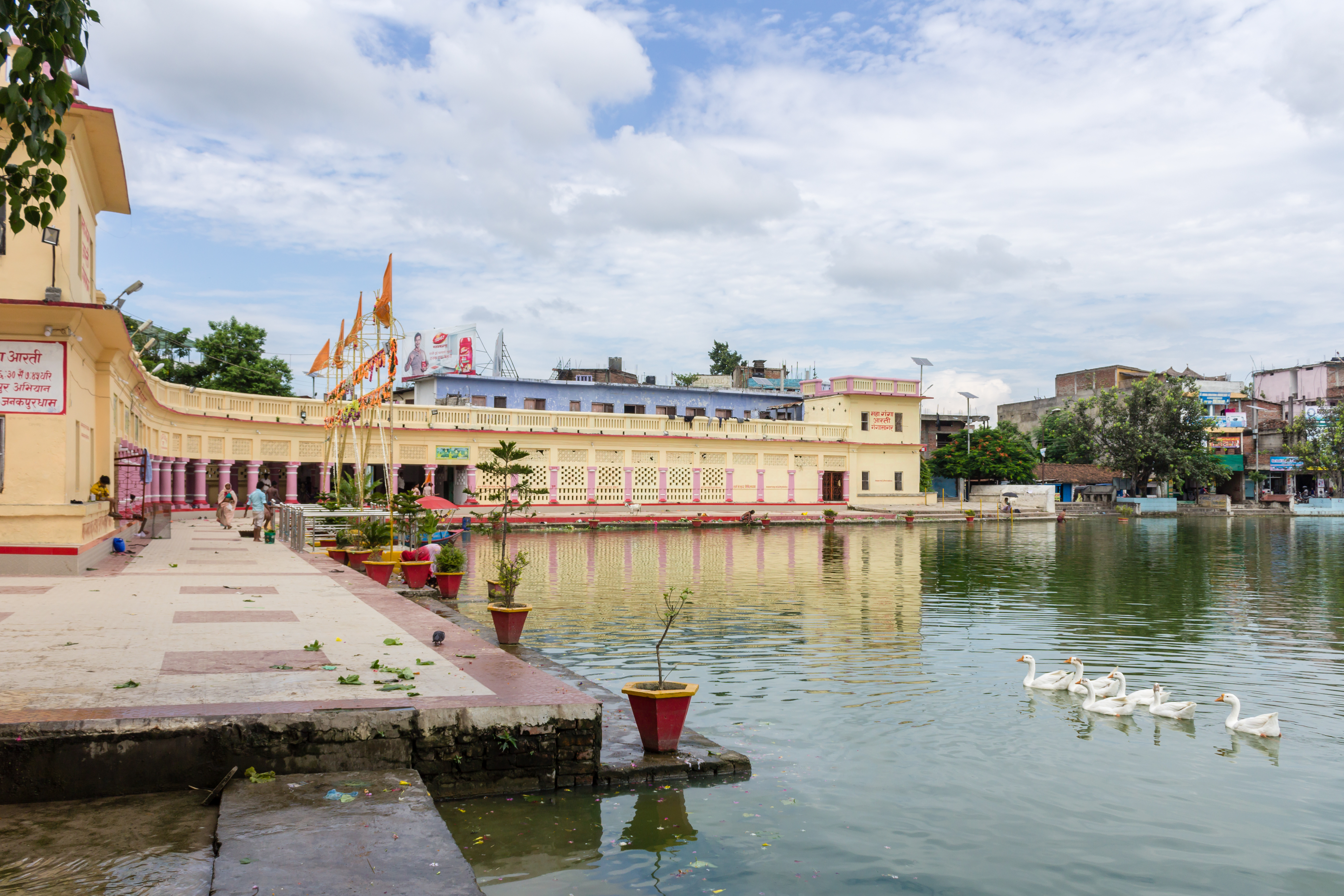
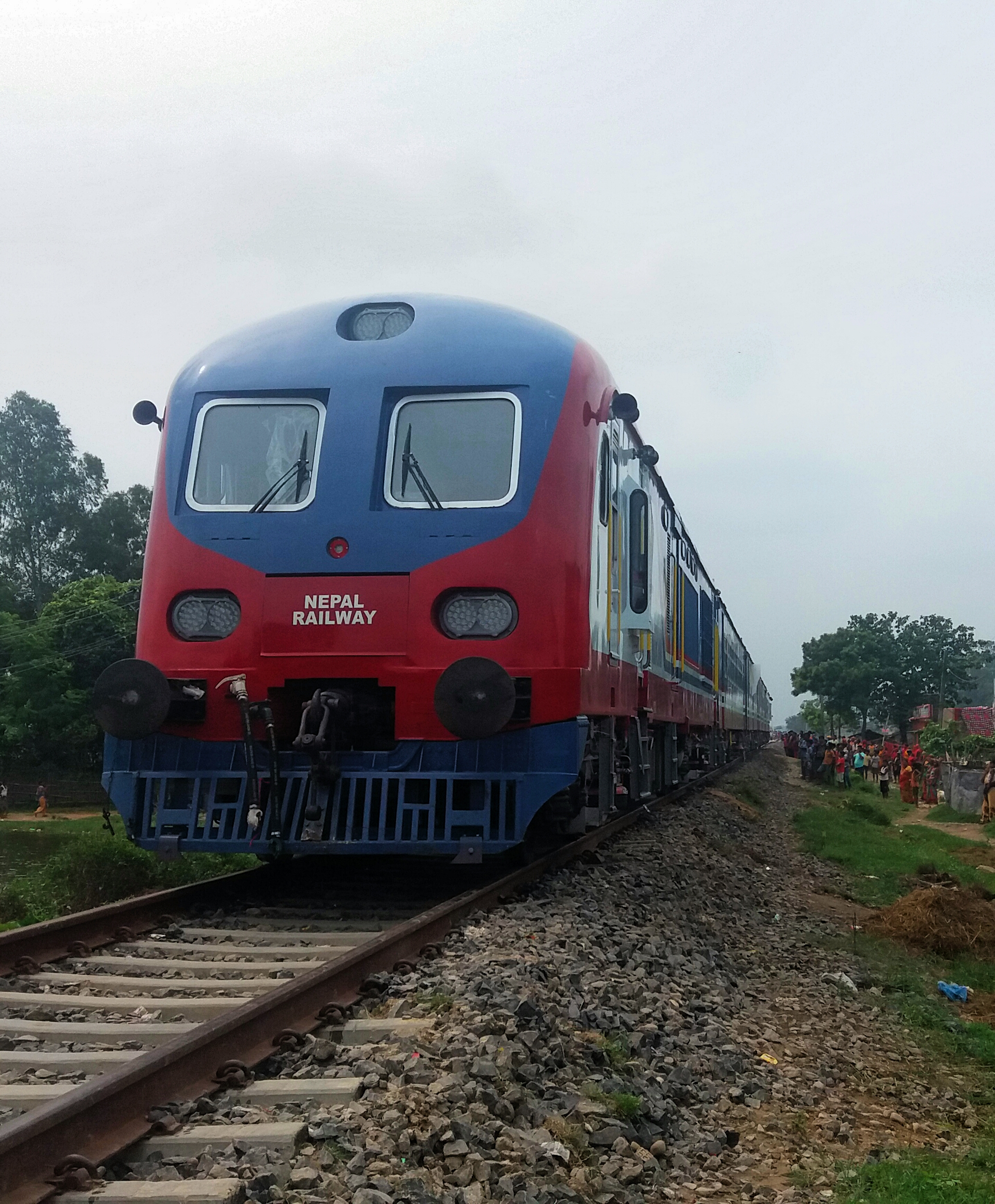
- Clockwise from top Janaki Mandir, Ganga Sagar, Train in Janakpur and Sita Ram Vivah Mandap
- Nickname: The City of Ponds
- Motto(s): City of religious and cultural significance
- Interactive map of Janakpur
- Location in Madhesh Province Janakpur (Nepal)
- Coordinates: 26°43′43″N 85°55′30″E
- Country: Nepal
- Province: Madhesh
- District: Dhanusha
- Settled: 1800s
- as Municipality: 1962
- ▲ to Sub-Metro: 2017
- Previously part of: Mithila
- Named for: King Janaka

Government
  - Type: Mayor–council government
  - Mayor: Manoj Kumar Sah (NC)
  - Deputy Mayor: Kishori Sah (NC)

Area
  - Total: 91.97 km^{2} (35.51 sq mi)
- Elevation: 74 m (243 ft)

Population (2021)
  - Total: 195,438
  - Rank: 11th
  - Density: 820/km^{2} (2,125/sq mi)
  - Rank: 4th
- Demonym: Maithil

Languages
  - Official: Nepali
  - Local: Maithili
- Time zone: UTC+5:45 (NST)
- Postal code: 45600
- Area code: 041
- Website: janakpurmun.gov.np

Janakpur or Janakpurdham (Maithili: जनकपुर, pronounced [/dʒənəkpuɾ/]), is the capital city of Madhesh Province in Nepal. This sub-metropolitan city is a central hub for the Maithili language, as well as for religious and cultural tourism in Nepal.

The city was founded in the early 18th century but was retrospectively designated as the location of the capital of the Videha kingdom and the birthplace of Hindu deity Sita. The founder of modern Janakpur is considered to be the 17th century's ascetic Hindu saint Sannyasi Shurkishordas.

Janakpur is located about 225 km (140 mi) southeast of Kathmandu. As of 2021, the city had a population of 195,438, with a density of 2,125/km^{2}. Janakpur is currently the fourth most densely populated city in Nepal. Janakpur is located about 23 km from the Bhitthamore border with India. Nepal Railways operates a service between Janakpur and Jainagar in India.

== Etymology ==
Janakpurdham, popularly known as Janakpur is named after the ancient King of the Videha kingdom in the Mithila region - Janaka. The rulers of the Videha kingdom were accorded the title Janaka, meaning 'father' in Sanskrit, and this character is the best-known bearer of the same.

The city of Janakpur, holds a legendary shrine dedicated to the legendary King Janaka of Mithila as the presiding deity of the city in a temple at the shrine. The temple is known as Rajashri Janak Mandir. It is located near the bank of the legendary pond known as Dhanushsagar. The vicinity around the temple is a major landmark in the city called Janak Chowk.

== History ==
Ratna Sagar, Janakpur

Accounts from ascetics, pandits, and bards suggest that Janakpur was founded in the early 18th century. The earliest description of Janakpur as a pilgrimage site dates back to 1805. Earlier archaeological evidence of an ancient city's presence has not been found, and there is a lack of evidence to associate the modern-day city of Janakpur with the ancient capital of the Videha kingdom.

Until the 1950s, Janakpur was a cluster of rural hamlets inhabited by farmers, artisans, priests, and clerks who worked for the monasteries that controlled the land. After the Independence Act in India, Janakpur expanded into a commercial center and became the capital of Dhanusa District in the 1960s.

Following the Sugauli Treaty of 1816 between the Nepali rulers and the British East India Company, the northern part of ancient Mithila state, including Janakpur, became part of Nepal, while the southern part became part of India.

== Demographics ==
Historical population
Year	Pop.	±%
1991	54,710	—
2001	74,192	+35.6%
2011	97,776	+31.8%
2021	195,438	+99.9%
Data is based on Census in Nepal . Source: Census in Nepal

As of June 2011, the Janakpur municipality had 19,195 households and a population of 98,446 people with a density of 4,000 people per square kilometer. In 2015, it was declared a sub-metropolitan city that incorporates 11 surrounding villages. The current population is 173,924 people, making it the sixth largest city in Nepal.

Maithili is widely spoken in the area as the first language and is also used as the lingua franca. Nepali, Hindi, Urdu, Marwari, and English are well understood. Languages like Bhojpuri and Awadhi are understood but less frequently used.

More than 90 percent of the total population is Hindu, with the rest being Muslims and Buddhists.

== Economy ==
Janakpur is one of the fastest-developing cities in Nepal and is the largest sub-metropolitan city in the country. The city has good healthcare facilities, several parks, private schools, colleges, and internet service providers. There are medical, engineering, and management colleges that are affiliated with Tribhuvan University. The economy is mostly based on tourism, agriculture, and local industries.

The paintings on pottery, walls, and courtyards created by Maithili women are known as Mithila art.

Janakpur attracts migrants from the surrounding areas, who move to the city for medical care, education, and jobs. The largest employers were the Janakpur Cigarette Factory Limited and Janakpur Railway until they closed in 2013 due to political corruption and heavy debts. By the end of 2018, services was resumed. The Zonal Hospital, Zonal Police, and the banking sector help the locals maintain a relatively comfortable lifestyle.

Several banks operate in Janakpur, offering a range of financial services. These include Nepal Bank Limited, Rastriya Banijya Bank, Agricultural Development Bank, Nabil Bank, NIC Asia Bank, Prabhu Bank, Everest Bank, Machhapuchhre Bank, Sanima Bank, Global IME Bank, Siddhartha Bank, Nepal SBI Bank, and Mega Bank Nepal Limited. In addition, the Nepal Rastra Bank has a provincial office in Janakpur to regulate banking activities in the region.

== Geography and climate ==
Janakpur is located in the Terai, where the climate is humid subtropical. The months of March and April are hot, dry, and windy. The wet season lasts from May to September, followed by a mild, dry autumn from October to November. Winter is cold from December to February.

The major rivers surrounding Janakpur are the Dudhmati, Jalad, Rato, Balan, and Kamala.

Climate data for Janakpur (1991–2020)
Month	Jan	Feb	Mar	Apr	May	Jun	Jul	Aug	Sep	Oct	Nov	Dec	Year
Mean daily maximum °C (°F)	21.6 (70.9)	26.2 (79.2)	31.4 (88.5)	34.9 (94.8)	34.8 (94.6)	34.1 (93.4)	32.8 (91.0)	33.0 (91.4)	32.7 (90.9)	31.9 (89.4)	29.5 (85.1)	24.6 (76.3)	30.6 (87.1)
Daily mean °C (°F)	15.4 (59.7)	19.0 (66.2)	23.6 (74.5)	27.9 (82.2)	29.5 (85.1)	30.1 (86.2)	29.7 (85.5)	29.9 (85.8)	29.2 (84.6)	27.1 (80.8)	22.6 (72.7)	17.8 (64.0)	25.1 (77.2)
Mean daily minimum °C (°F)	9.2 (48.6)	11.7 (53.1)	15.8 (60.4)	20.9 (69.6)	24.2 (75.6)	26.1 (79.0)	26.5 (79.7)	26.7 (80.1)	25.7 (78.3)	22.2 (72.0)	15.7 (60.3)	11.0 (51.8)	19.6 (67.3)
Average precipitation mm (inches)	12.1 (0.48)	8.3 (0.33)	13.2 (0.52)	54.6 (2.15)	123.7 (4.87)	259.4 (10.21)	437.9 (17.24)	319.1 (12.56)	179.6 (7.07)	54.3 (2.14)	1.4 (0.06)	2.8 (0.11)	1,466.4 (57.73)
Source: Department of Hydrology and Meteorology

== Transport ==
=== Roadways ===
Frequent bus services operate between Janakpur and other Nepalese cities. Within the city, cycle rickshaws, electric rickshaws, tempos (three-wheeled vehicles), and buses are available. A few bus services operate to the Indian cities of Sitamarhi, Patna, Delhi and Ayodhya as part of the Ramayan Circuit, promoting religious tourism in Nepal and India. It will be connected to the proposed Ram-Janaki Path highway at Bhitthamore in India near Indo-Nepal border. The proposed highway of Ram-Janaki Path in India will provide direct connectivity to the culturally tied city of Ayodhya from Janakpur.

=== Railways ===
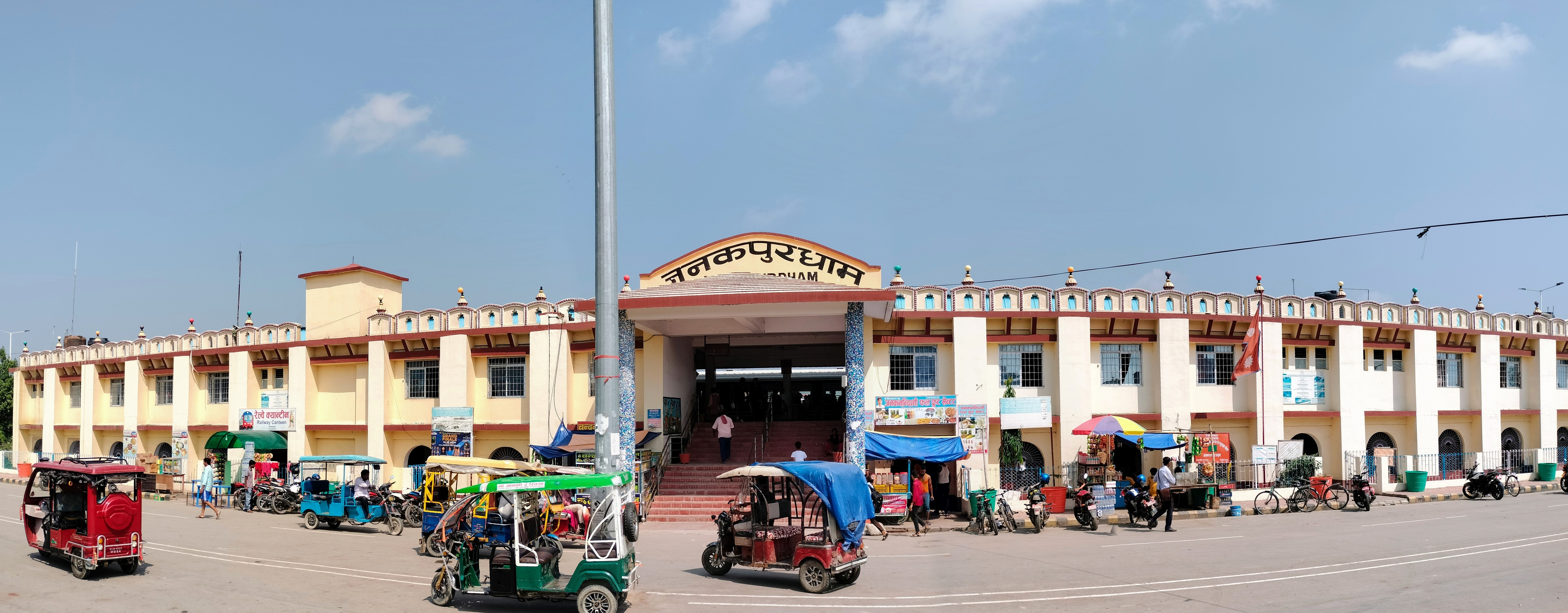
Panorama view of Janakpurdham Railway Station, Nepal

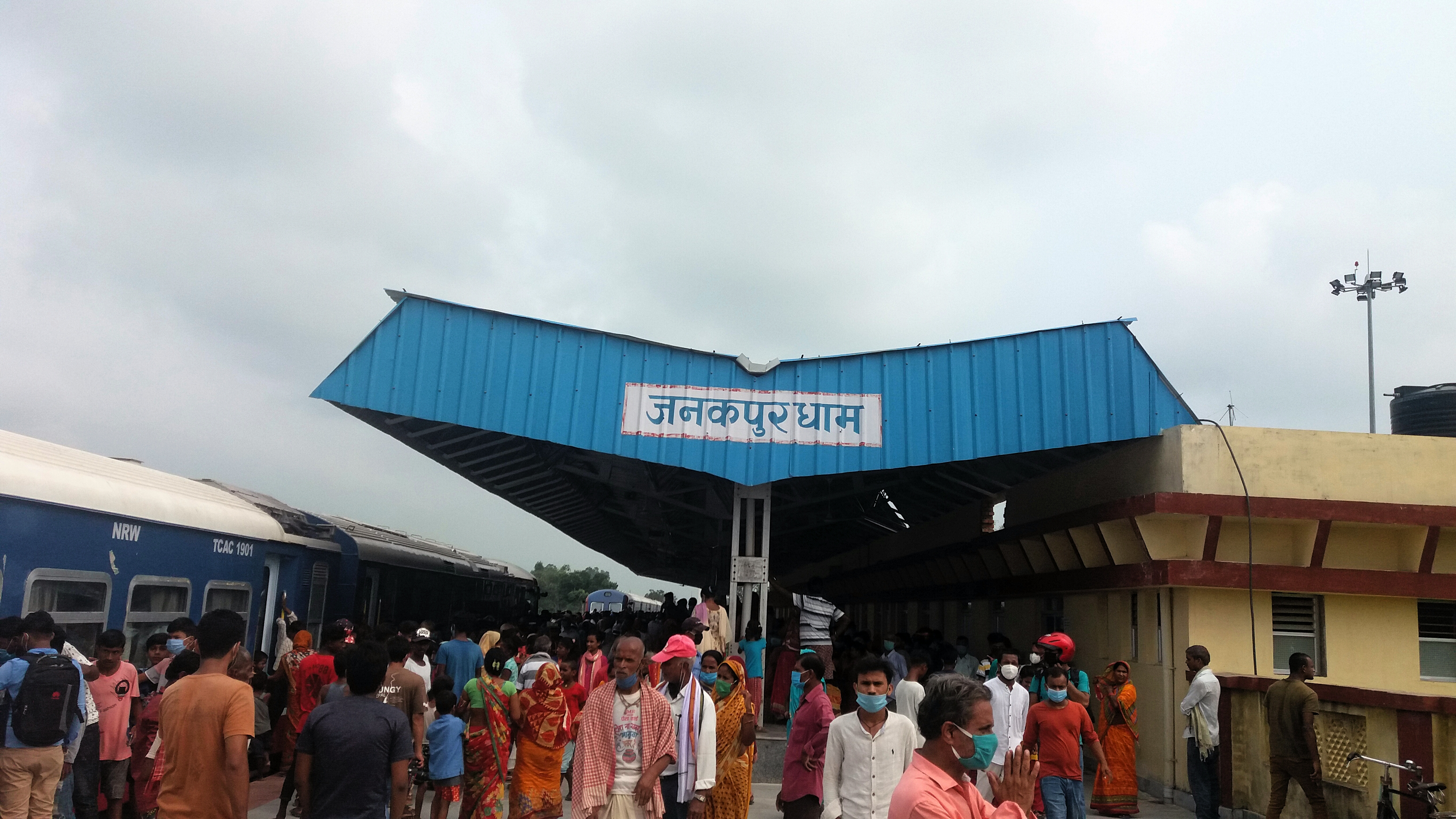
Janakpur Railway Station

Jaynagar–Bardibas railway line, operated by Nepal Railways is the only operational railway in Nepal. It connects Janakpur to Siraha at the Nepal-India border and continues further to the Indian city of Jaynagar, Bihar. There is a customs checkpoint in Siraha for goods.

=== Airways ===
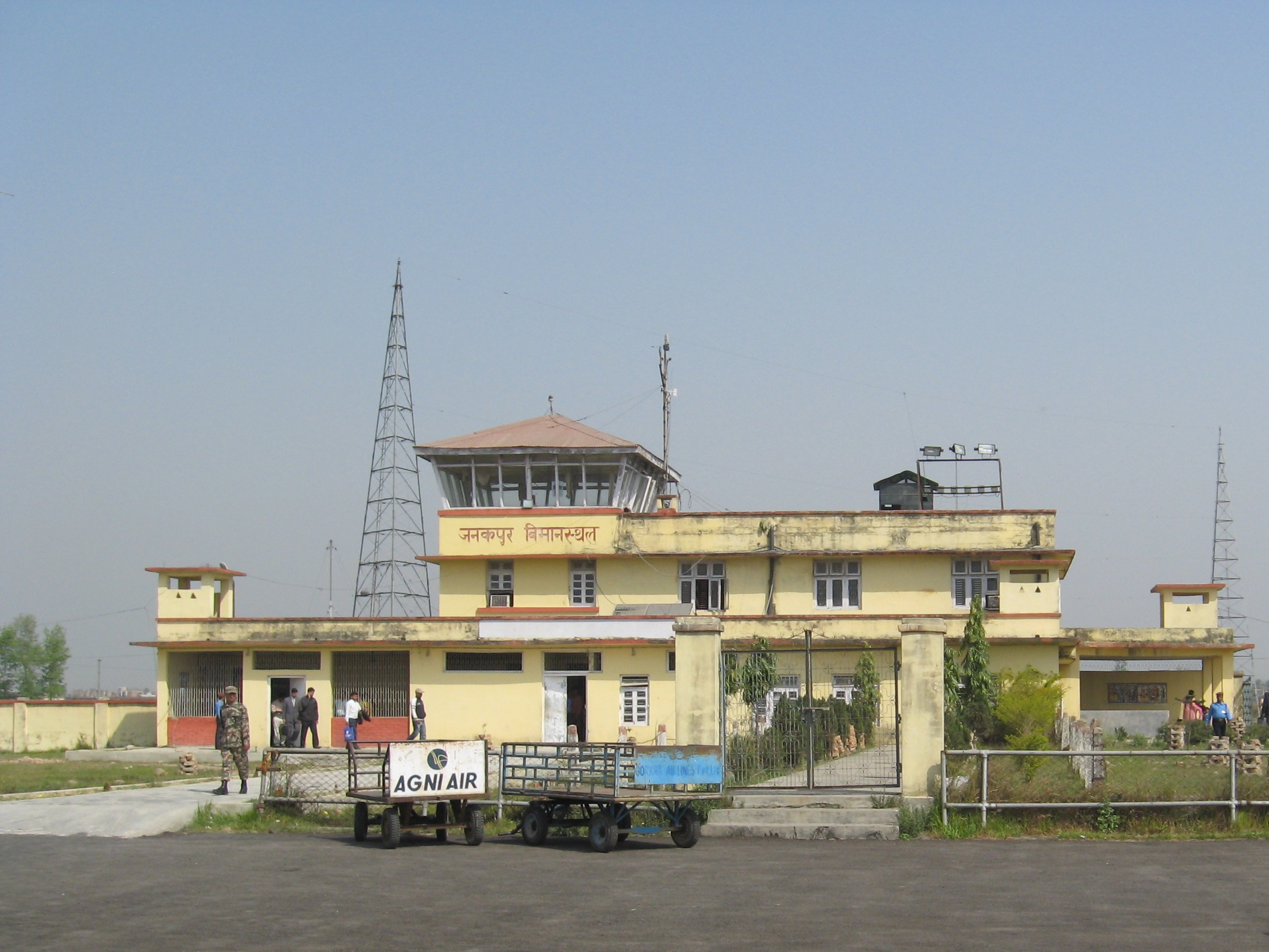
Janakpur Airport Terminal

Janakpur has a domestic airport (IATA: JKR, ICAO: VNJP) with most flights connecting to Kathmandu, There are plans of expanding it as a regional airport.

Airlines	Destinations
Buddha Air	Kathmandu
Yeti Airlines	Kathmandu
Shree Airlines	Kathmandu

== Culture ==
=== Religious sites ===
The Janaki Mandir is in the centre of Janakpur, northwest of the market. It is one of the biggest temples in Nepal and was built in 1898 (1955 in the Nepali calendar) by Queen Brisabhanu Kunwari of Tikamgarh. It is also called Nau Lakha Mandir, named after the construction cost, said to be nine lakh gold coins. The temple is architecturally unique in Nepal: its inner sanctum contains a flower-covered statue of Sita which was found in the Sarayu River near Ayodhya. Statues of Rama and his brothers Lakshman, Bharat, and Satrughna stand beside Sita.

Adjacent to the Janaki Mandir is the Rama Sita Vivaha Mandir, a building that commemorates the marriage of Rama and Sita.

Often considered one of the oldest temples in Janakpur is Sri Ram Temple, is said to have been built by the Gorkhali General Amar Singh Thapa.(citation does not exist, false claim) Pilgrims also visit over 200 sacred ponds in the city for ritual baths. The two most important ponds, Dhanush Sagar and Ganga Sagar, are located close to the city center.

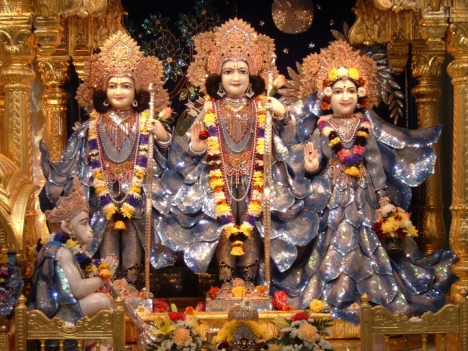
Deities of Sri Sita Devi (far right) and Sri Rama (centre) (with Sri Lakshmana (far left) and Sri Hanuman (below seated))

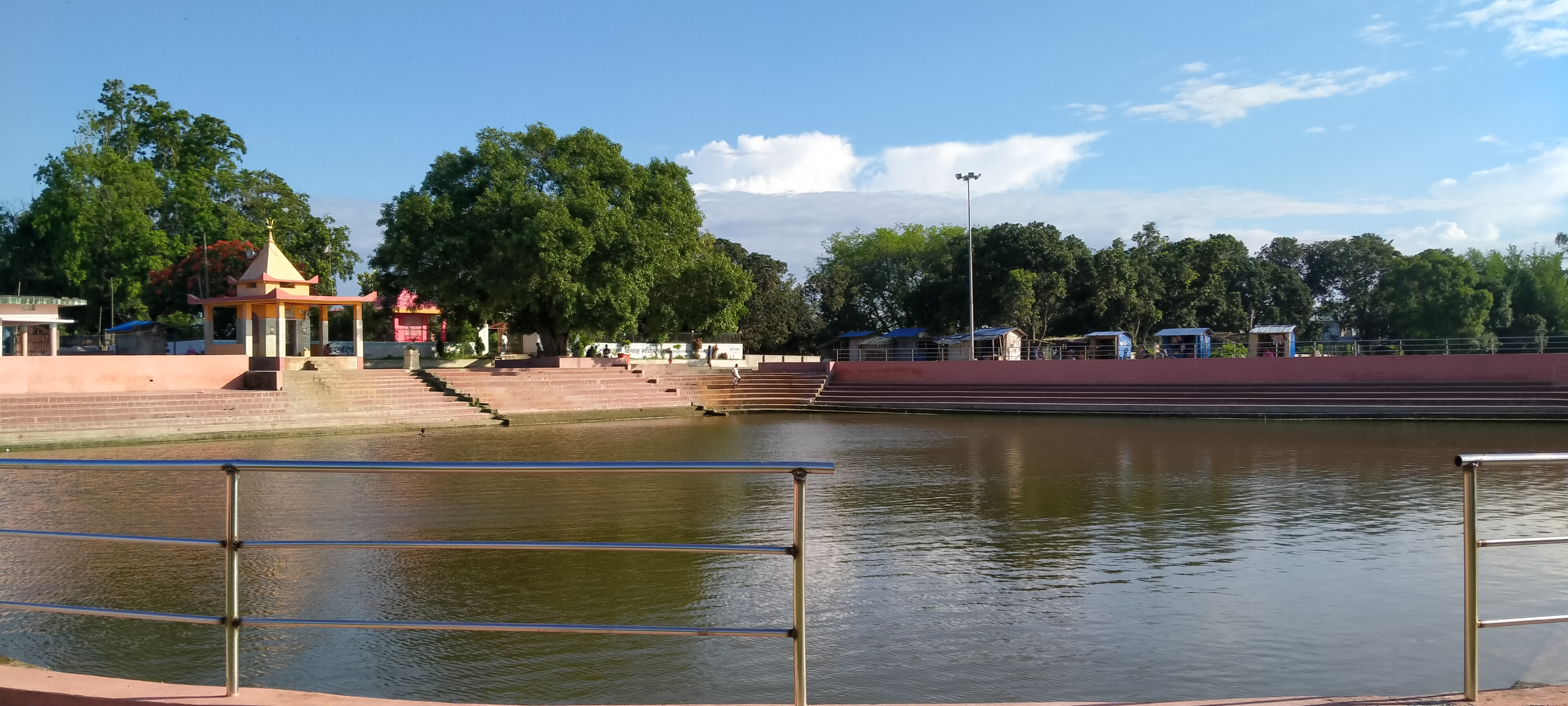
Pond in front of Mani mandap, Rani Bazar. The place where the marriage of Ram and Sita actually happened.

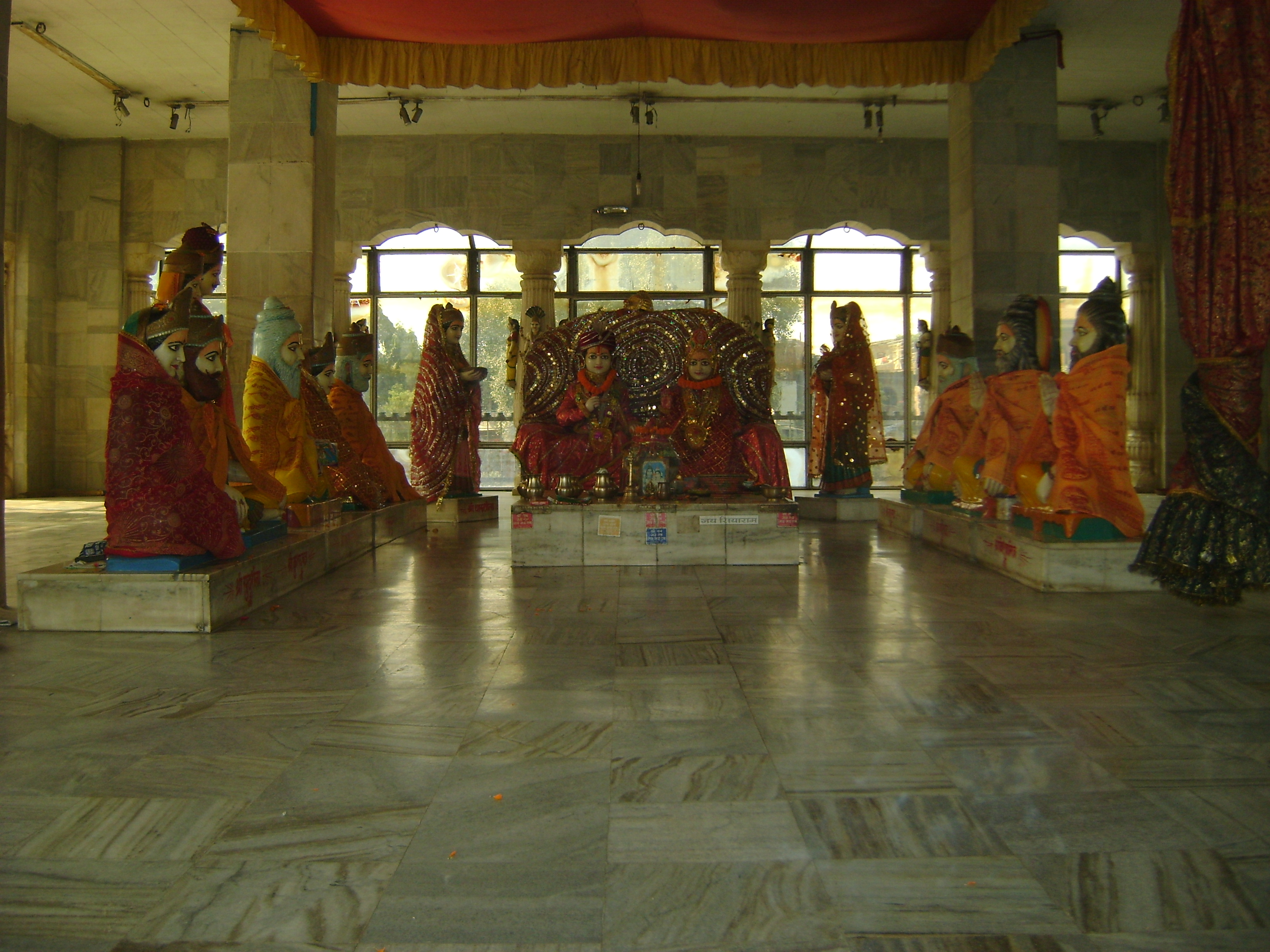
Ram Janaki Biwaha Mandap

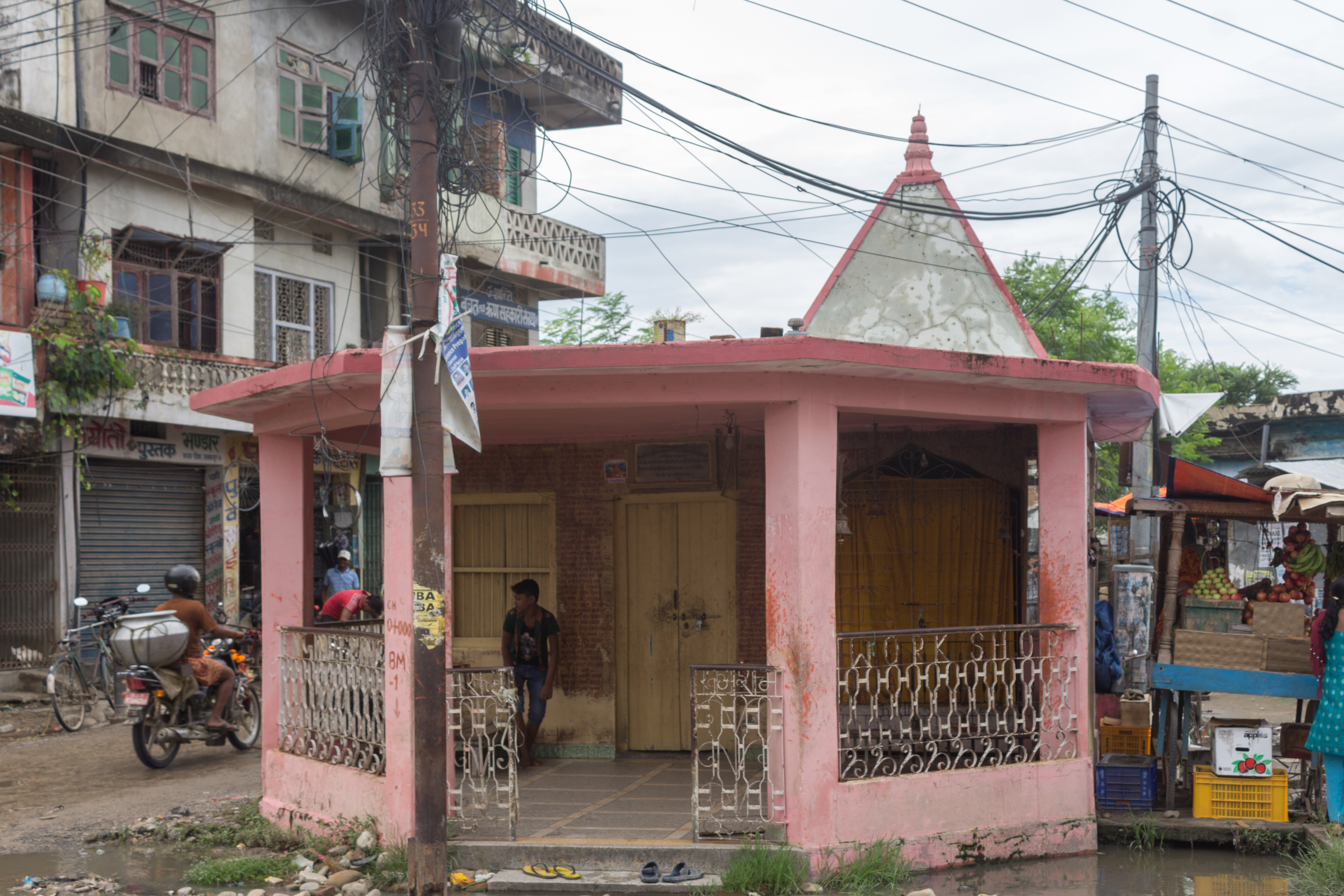
Hanuman Mandir, Kadam Chowk

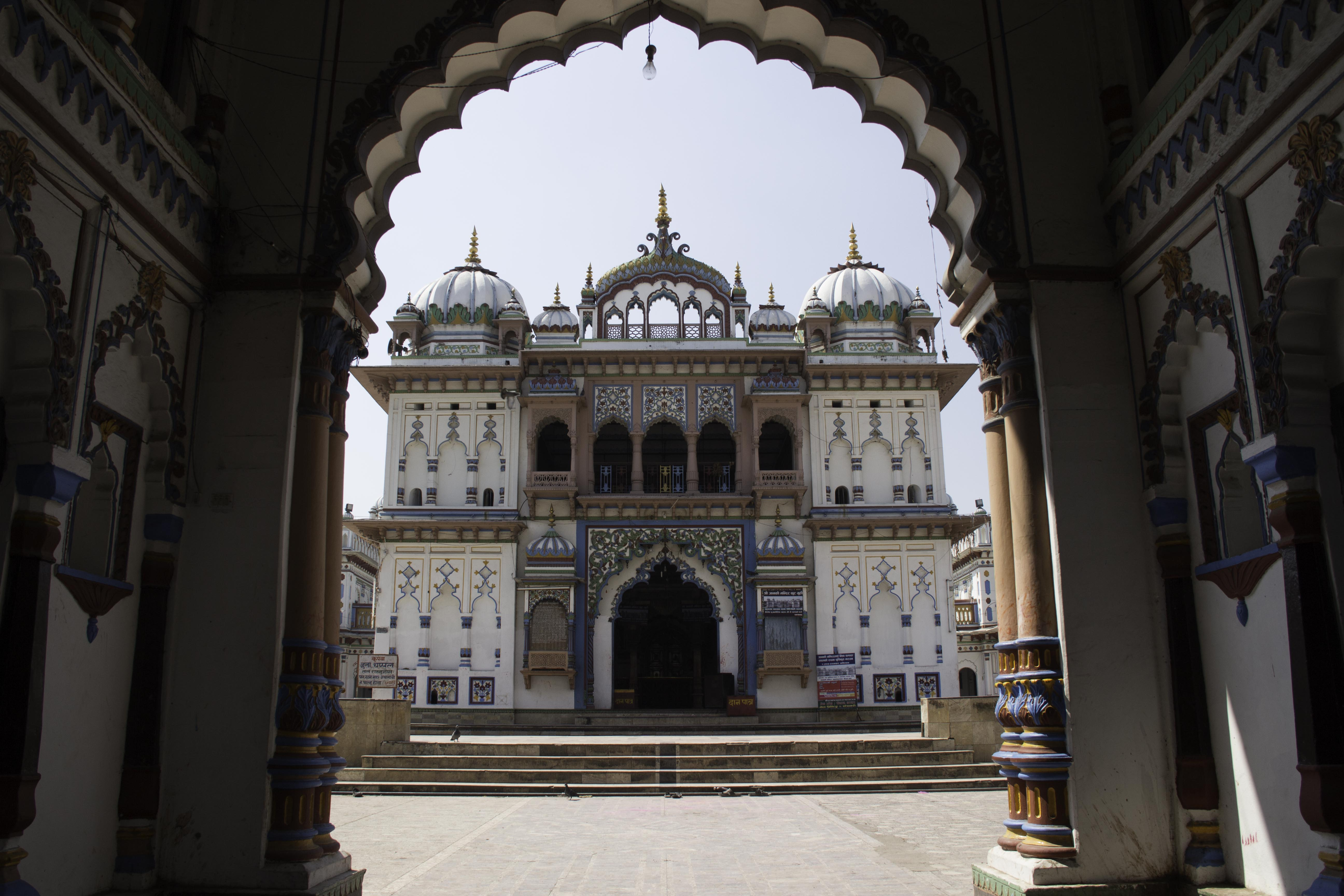
Janaki Mandir

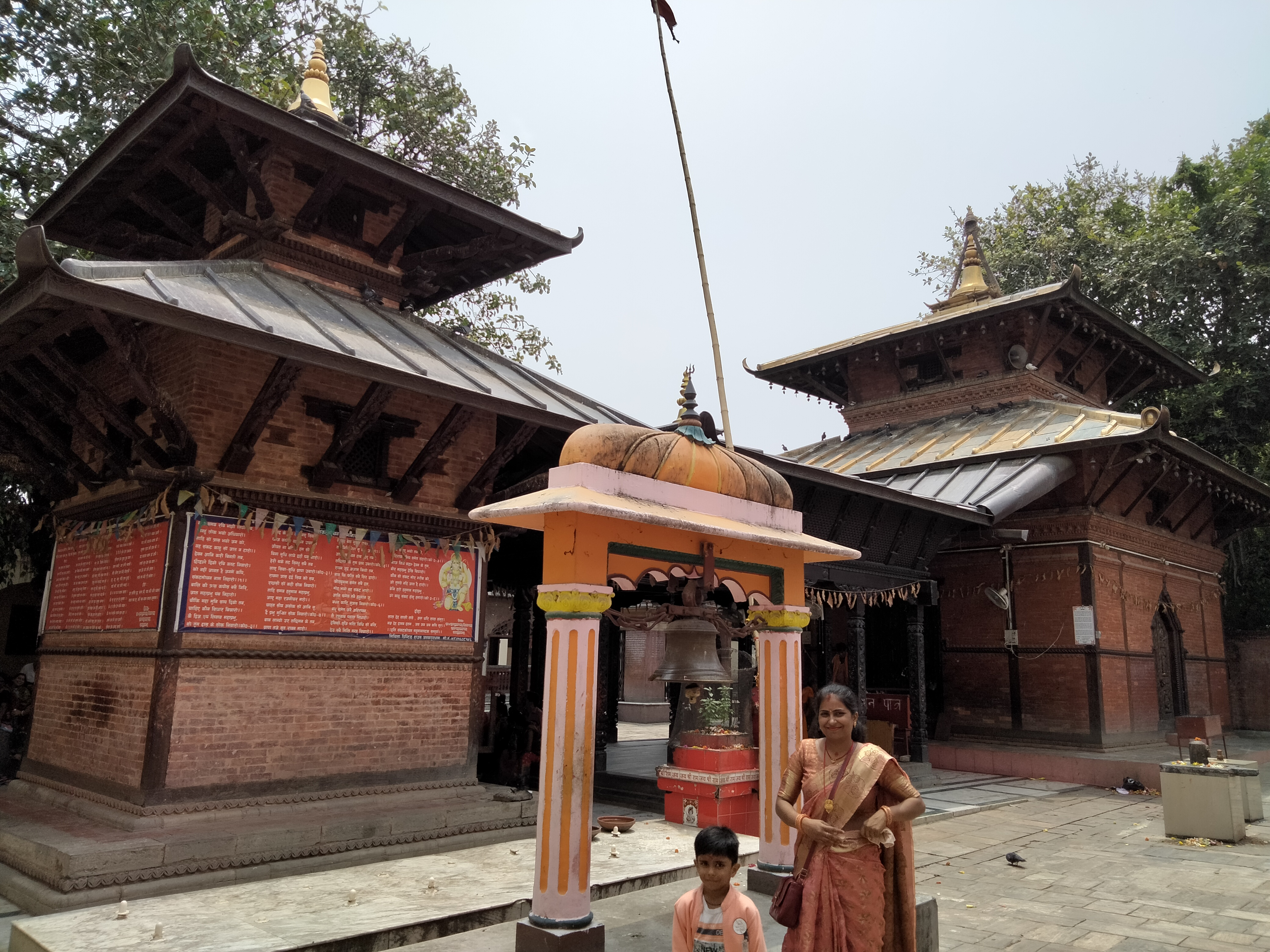
Ram Mandir, Janakpur, Mithila

==== Other religious sites ====
- Vivah Mandap temple is situated next to the Janaki Mandir
- Ram Tower is also next to Janaki Mandir. It was inaugurated by former Prime Minister Sushil Koirala, located to the south of Ram Temple.
- Kapileshwar Temple

=== Festivals ===
Major religious celebrations include the Hindu festivals of Vivaha Panchami, Dipawali, and Vijayadashami, followed by Chhath Puja, which is celebrated six days after Diwali, and Makar Sankranti.

On the night of the full moon in February or March, before the festival of Holi, a one-day Parikrama (circumambulation) of the city is observed. Many people offer prostrated obeisances along the entire 8 km (5.0 mi) route. Two other festivals honor Rama and Sita: Rama Navami, the birthday of Lord Rama, and the Vivaha Panchami that re-enacts the wedding of Rama and Sita at the Vivah Mandap temple on the fifth day of the waxing moon in November or early December.

== Education ==
Janakpur has educational facilities where several of the country's elites went to school, including the first president of the Federal Republic of Nepal, Ram Baran Yadav, and former DPM (Deputy Prime Minister), Bimalendra Nidhi. There are many private and government schools and colleges located in Janakpur. One of the oldest government colleges of Nepal, Ramsworup Ramsagar Bahumukhi Campus, which is a constituent campus of Tribhuvan University, is located in Janakpur. Janakpur also has Rajarshi Janak University for higher studies.

Janakpur also has a medical college, Janaki Medical College, which is also affiliated with Tribhuvan University. Similarly, for engineering studies, the city has Central Engineering College, affiliated to Purbanchal University. Janakpur also have one autonomous institute named Madesh Institute of Health Sciences (MIHS).

Janakpur is the educational hub for high school. There are hundreds of high school like Shree Saraswati Ma Vï, Sankat Mochan School, MIT School, New English School and many more.

And many colleges like Model Multiple College, MIT, Dhanusha Science Campus, Rajshree Janak Campus are also there for higher studies in different streams.

=== Libraries ===
Gangasagar Public Library was established in 1955 and is situated between two historical ponds of Janakpur—Dhanuschatra Pond and Ganga Sagar. The library was reopened to the public in 2012. In recent times, a team of active and committed local youth workers has contributed to the revival of this library by organizing public book collections for the library. It is open daily for three hours, mainly for newspaper-reading, but has few daily visitors.

Ramswaroop Ramsagar Multiple Campus library is also accessible to the general public.

== Media ==
The local media of Janakpur primarily consists of several community radio stations, some TV channels, and a few print newspaper.

== Sister cities ==
- Ayodhya, India
  - Ayodhya and Janakpur became sister cities in November 2014. Ayodhya is the birthplace of Rama and Janakpur is the birthplace of his consort, Sita.

== Gallery ==
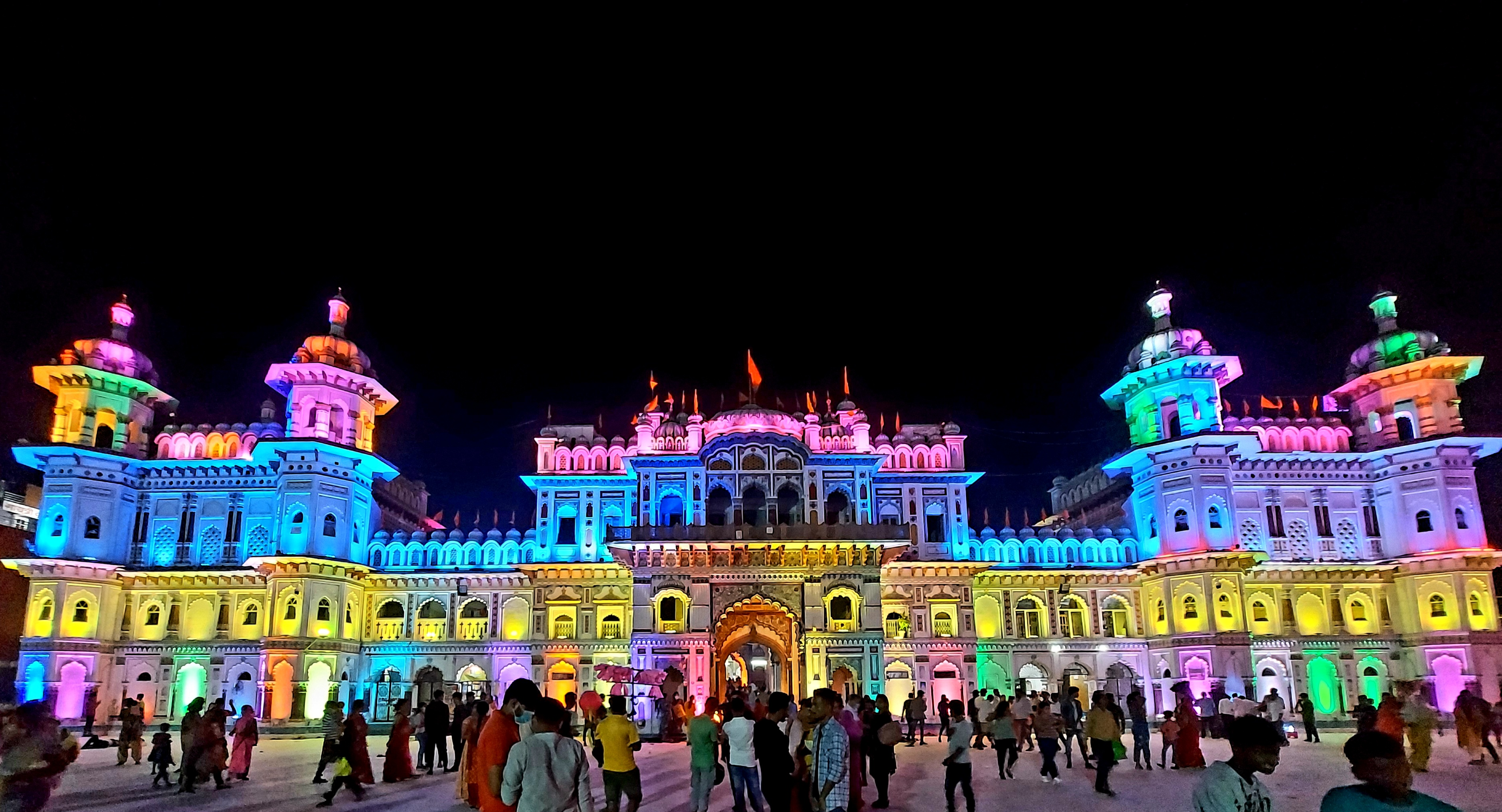
Night view of Janaki Temple

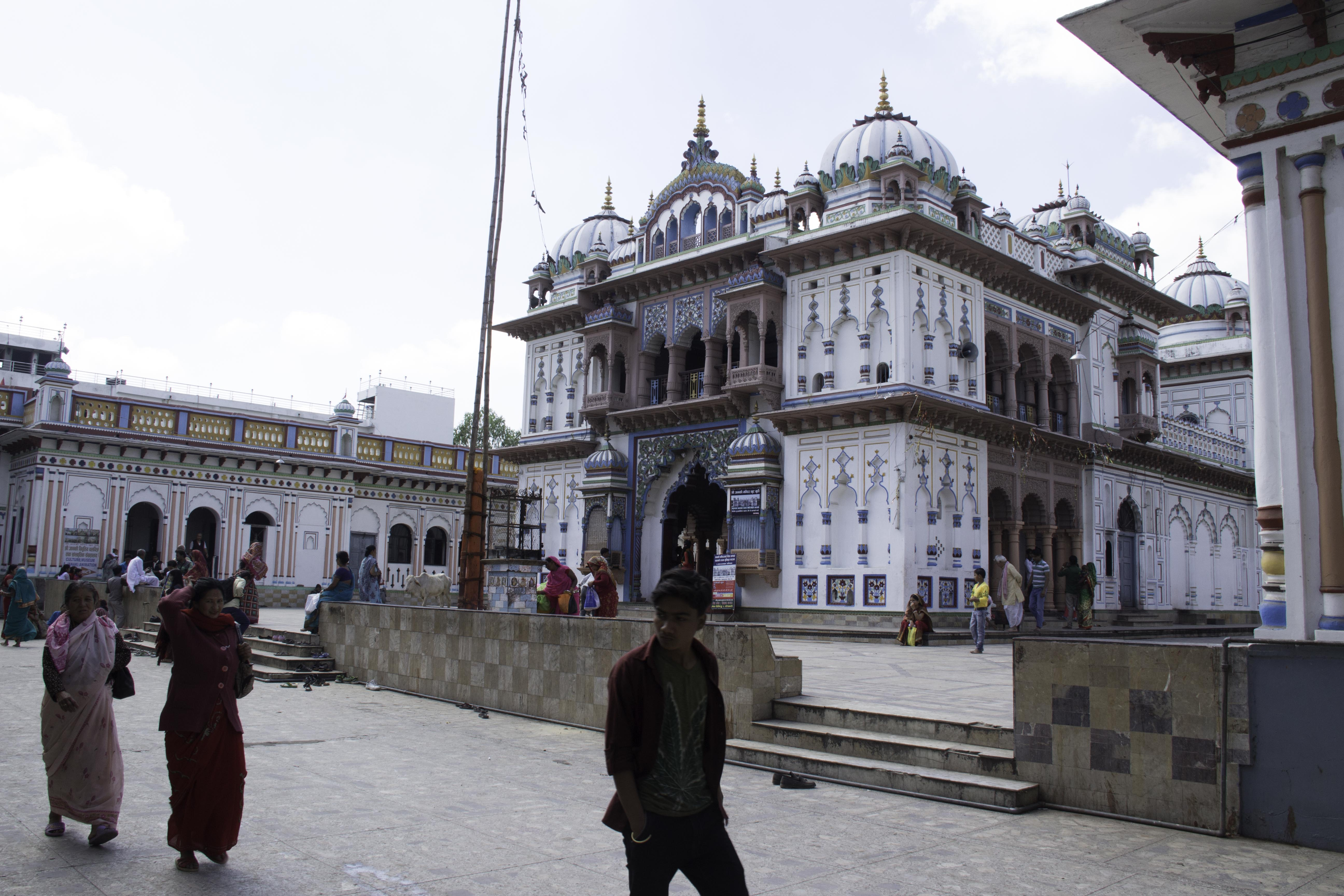
Inside view of Janaki Temple

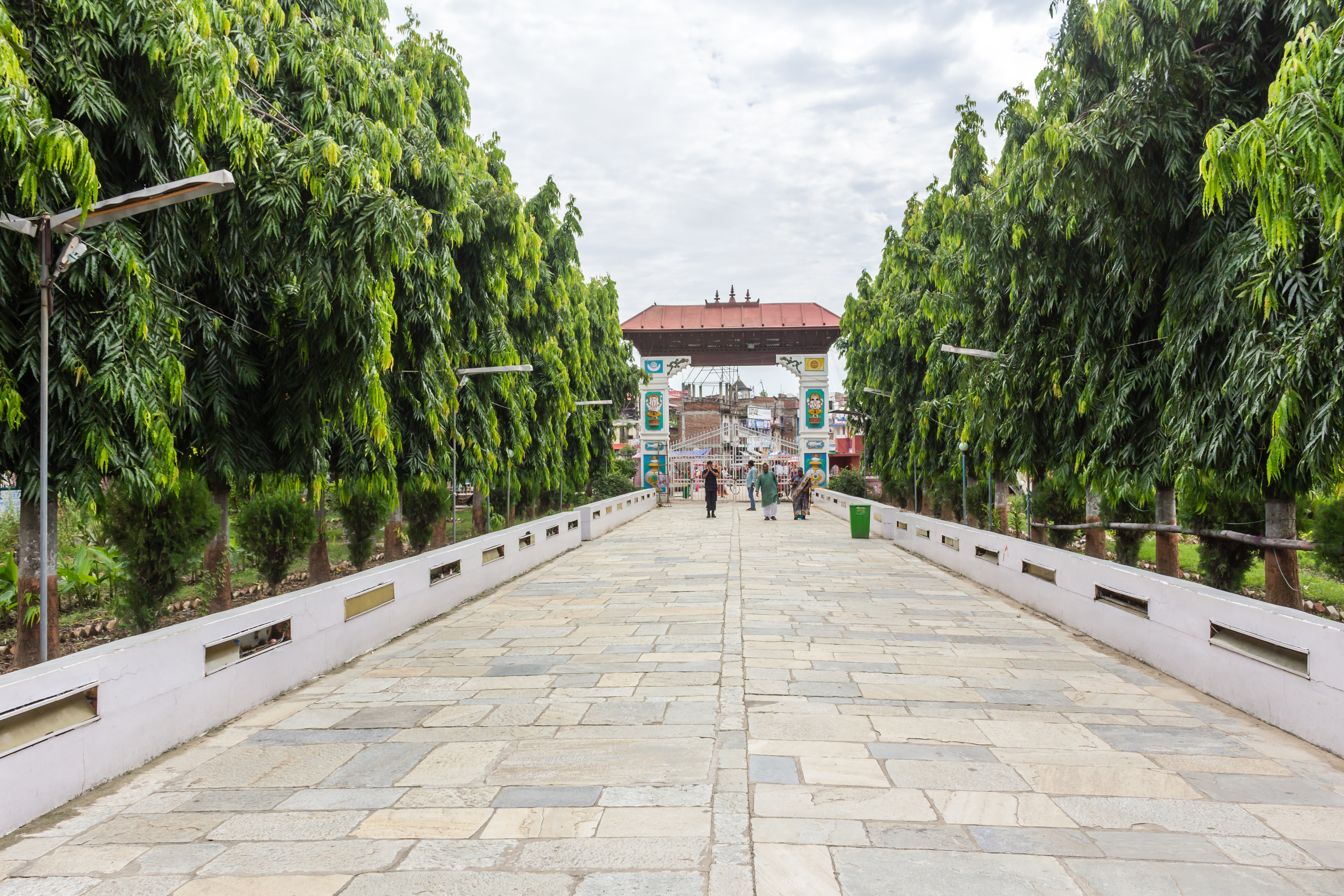
Way to Vivah Mandap

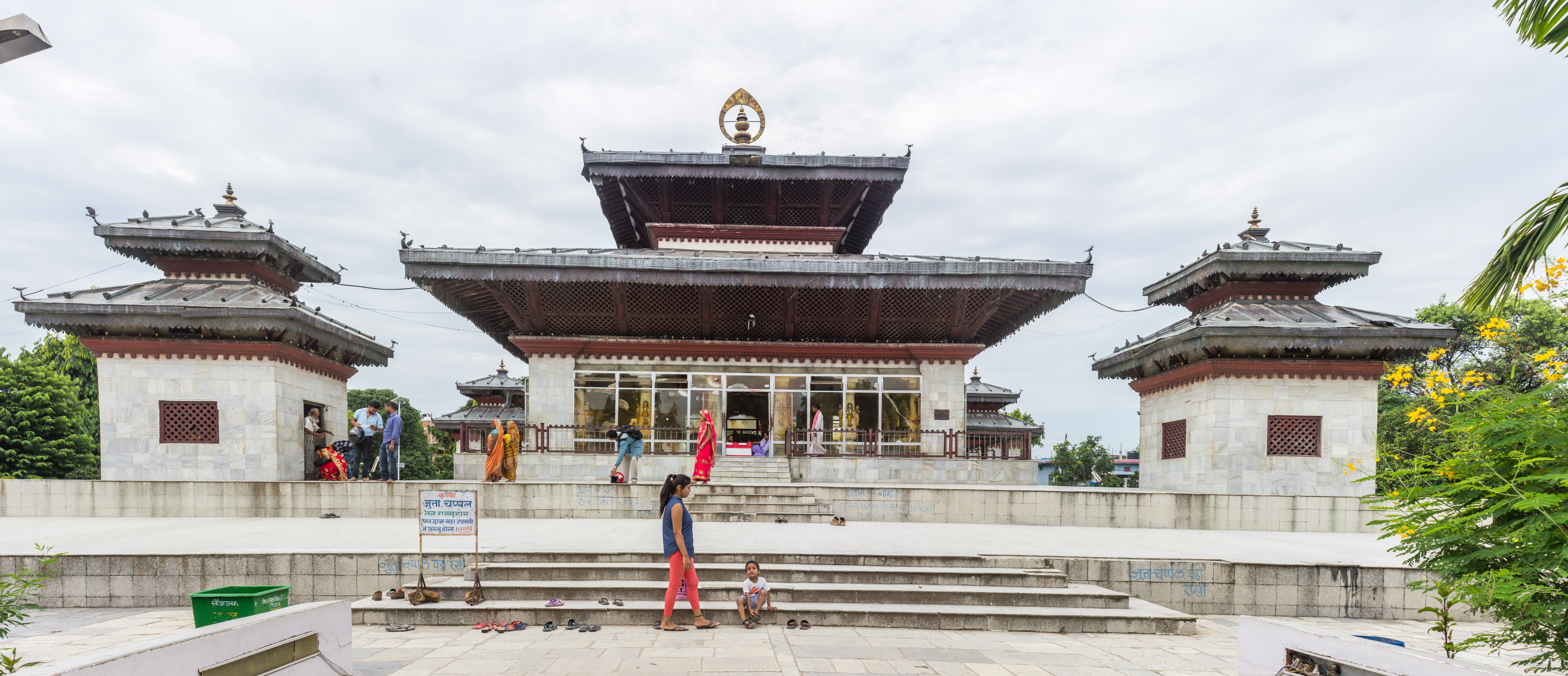
Vivah Manadap

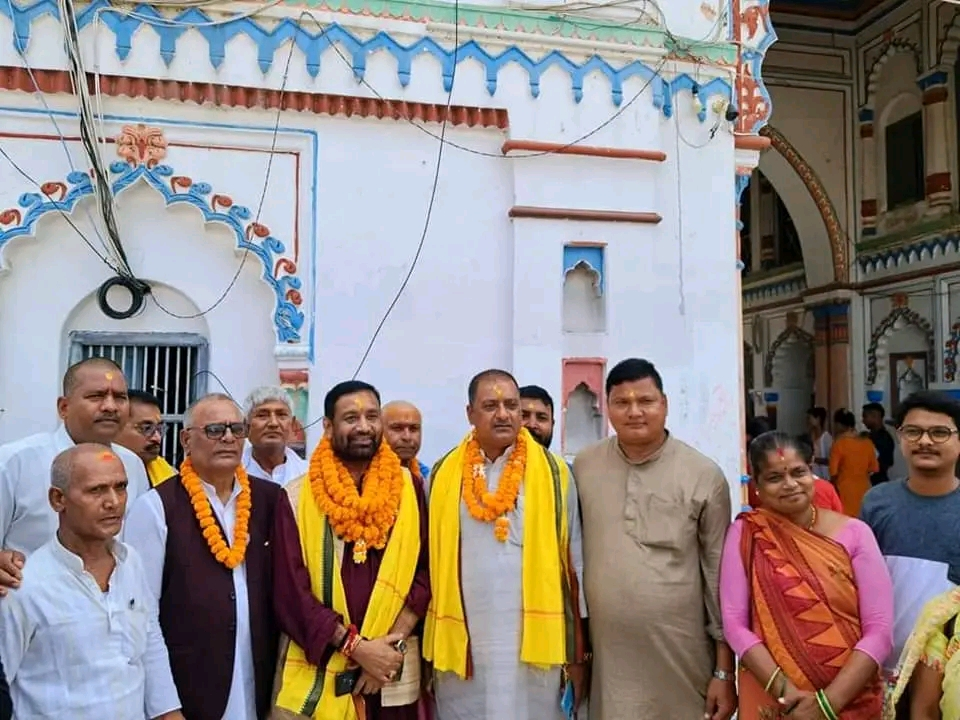
Former Deputy Prime minister and NC Vice president Bimalendra Nidhi at Janaki Mandir

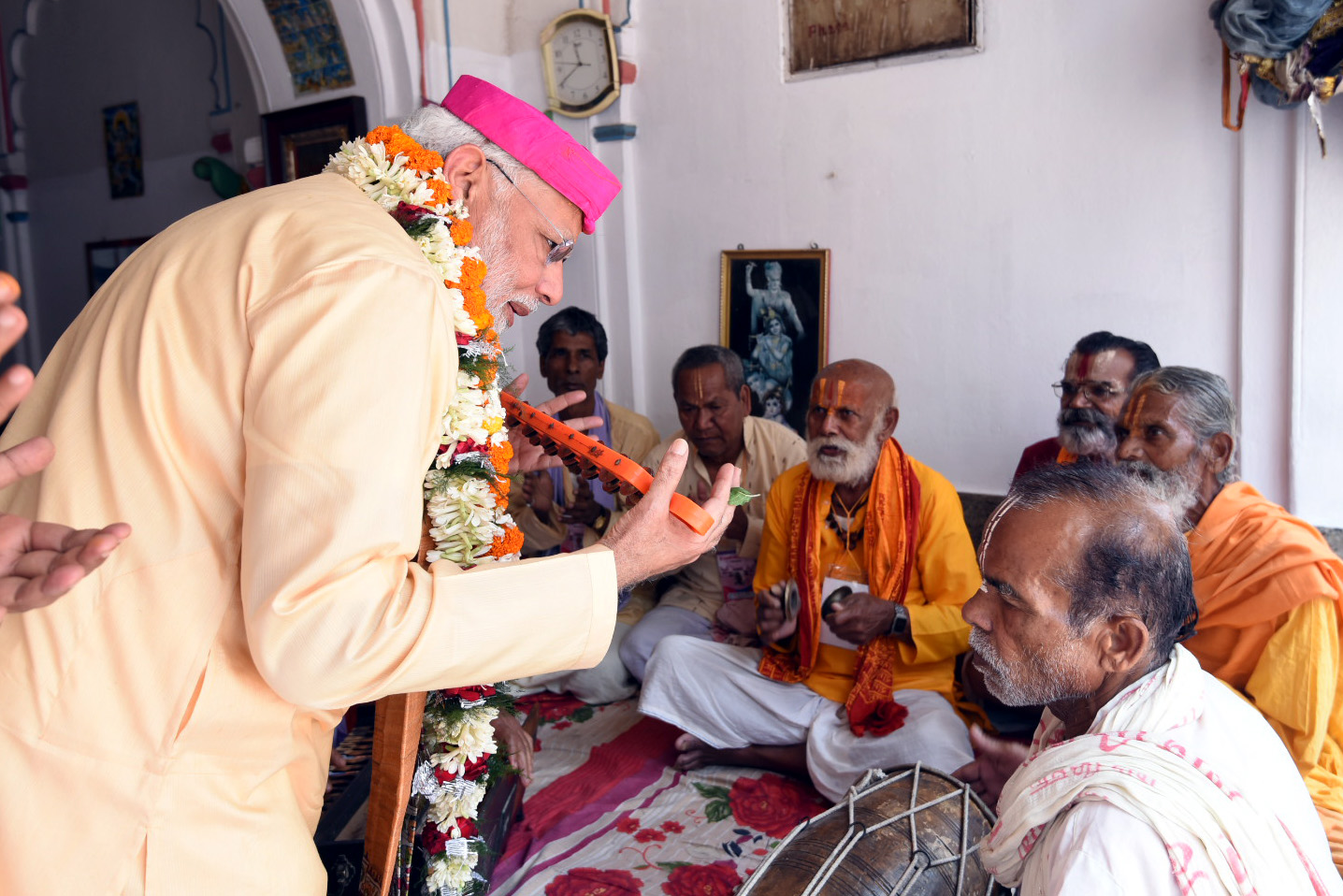
Indian PM Modi in Janakpur wearing famous Maithili cap, Paag

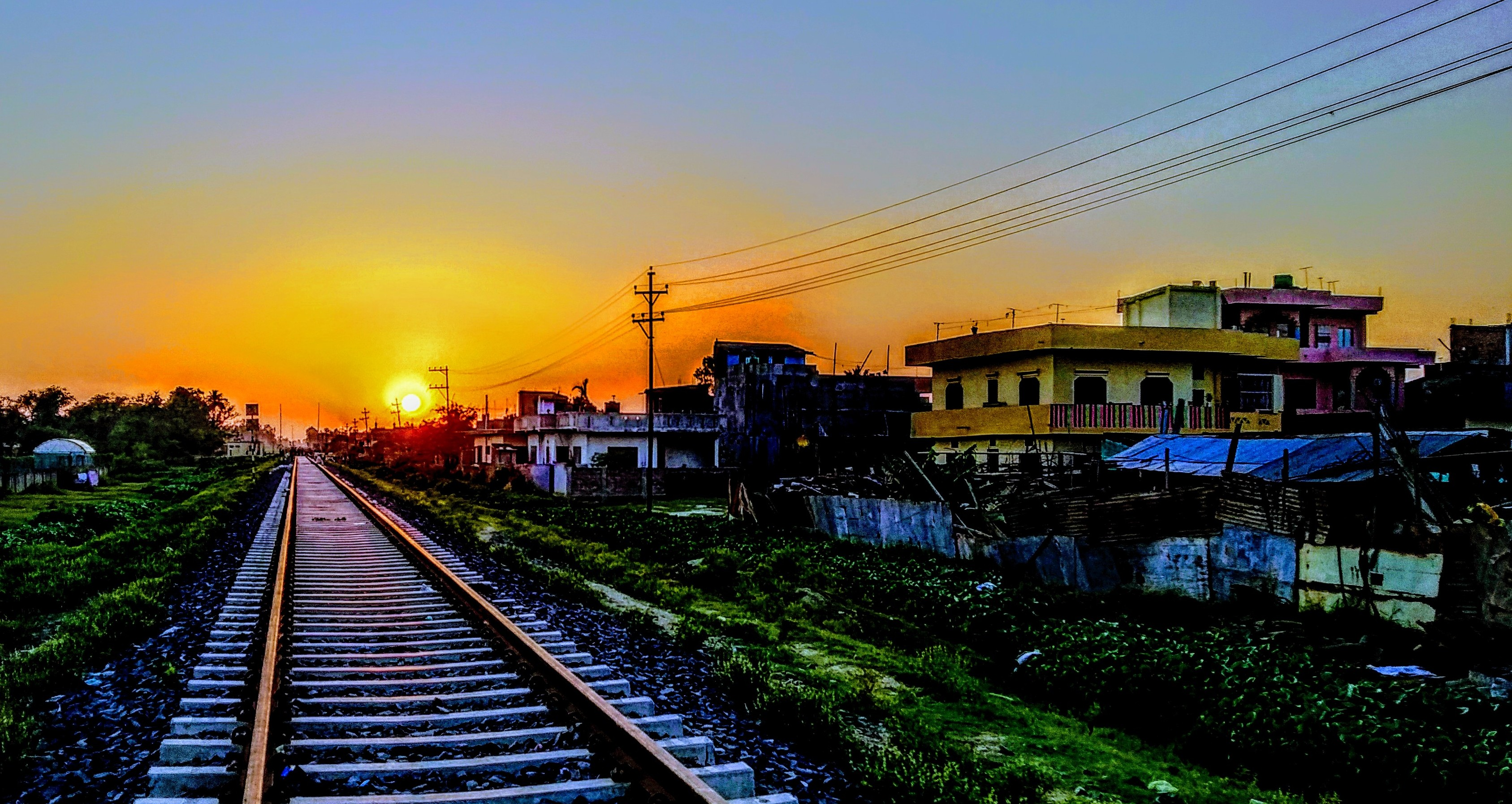
Sunset over railway track near Janakpur

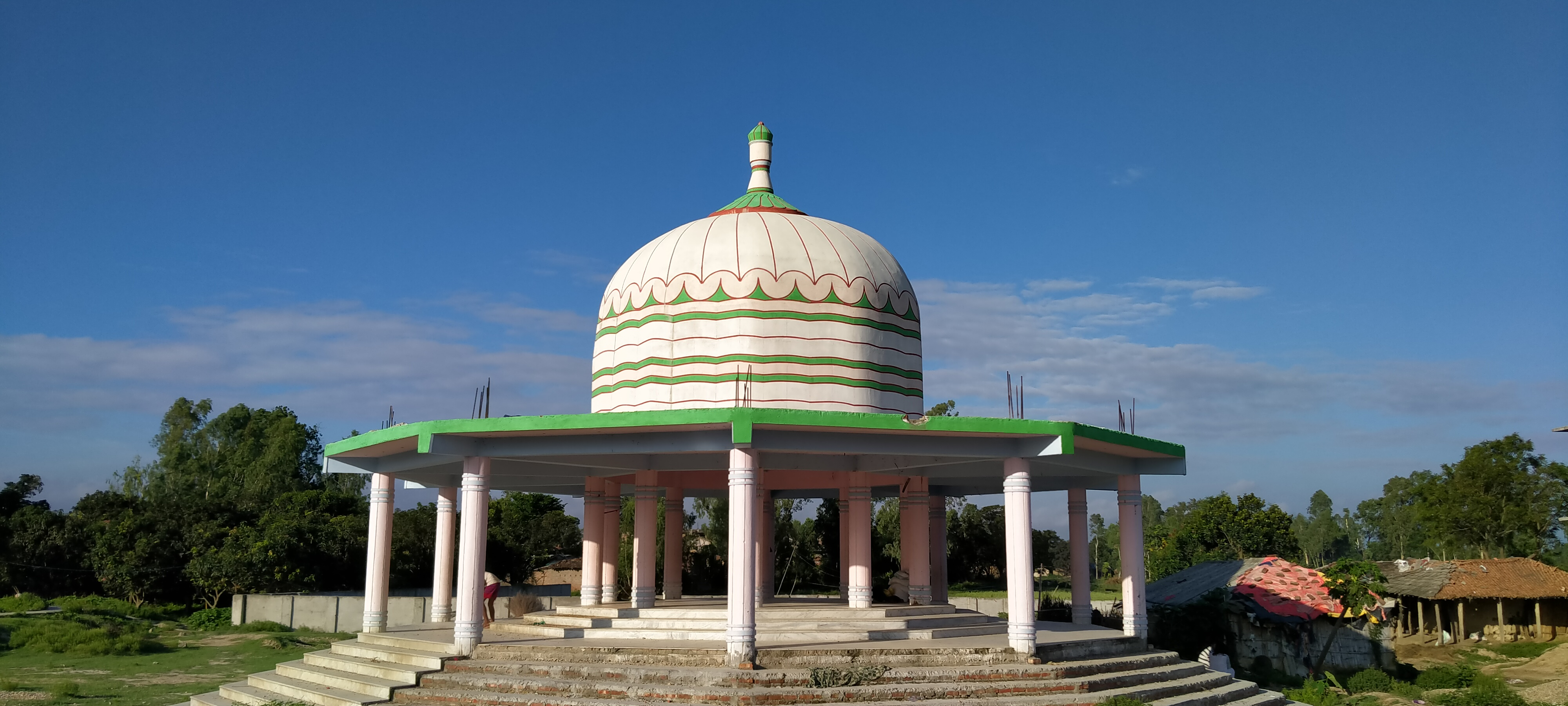
Vedi, mani mandap, Janakpur

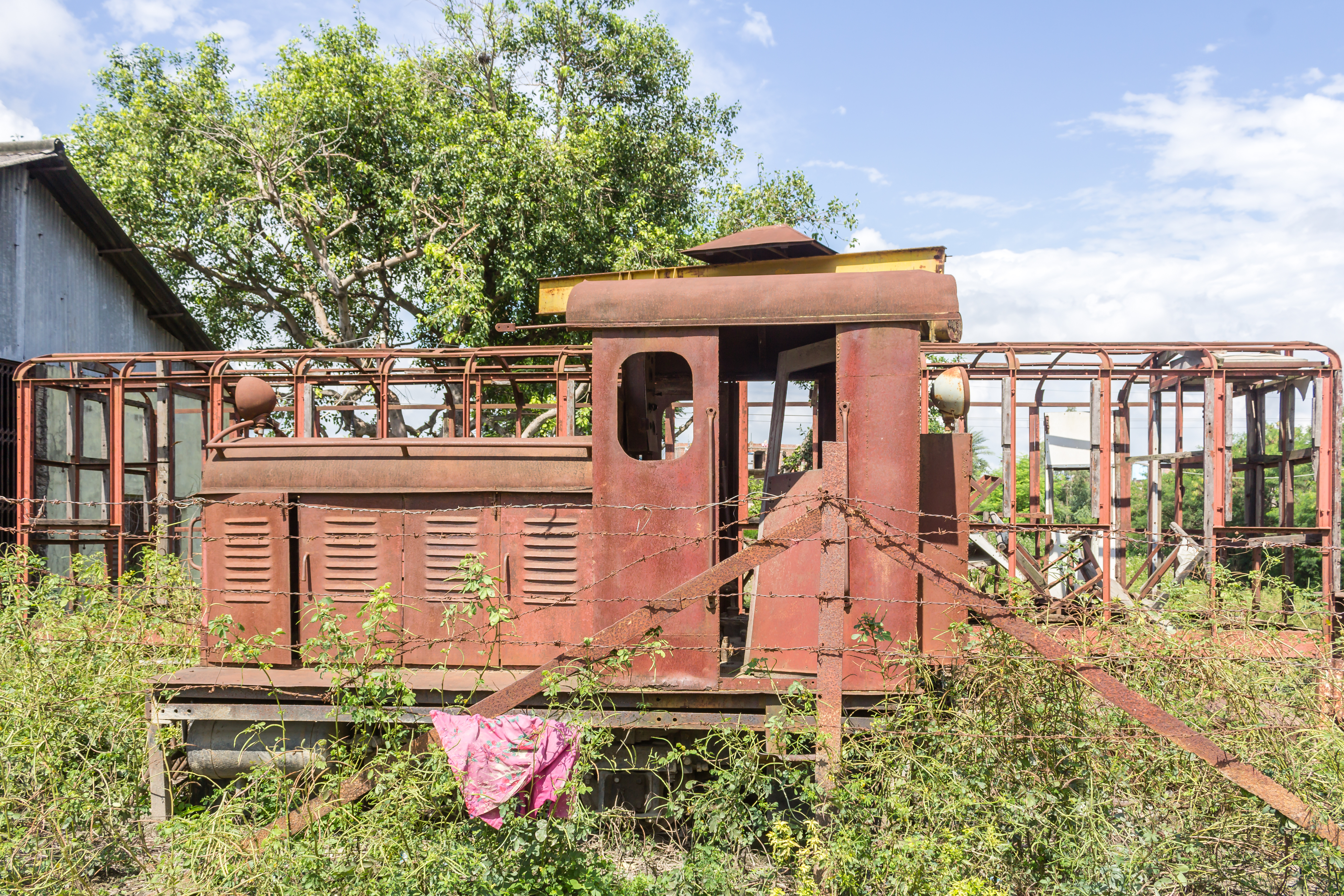
Abandoned Old Train at Janakpur station

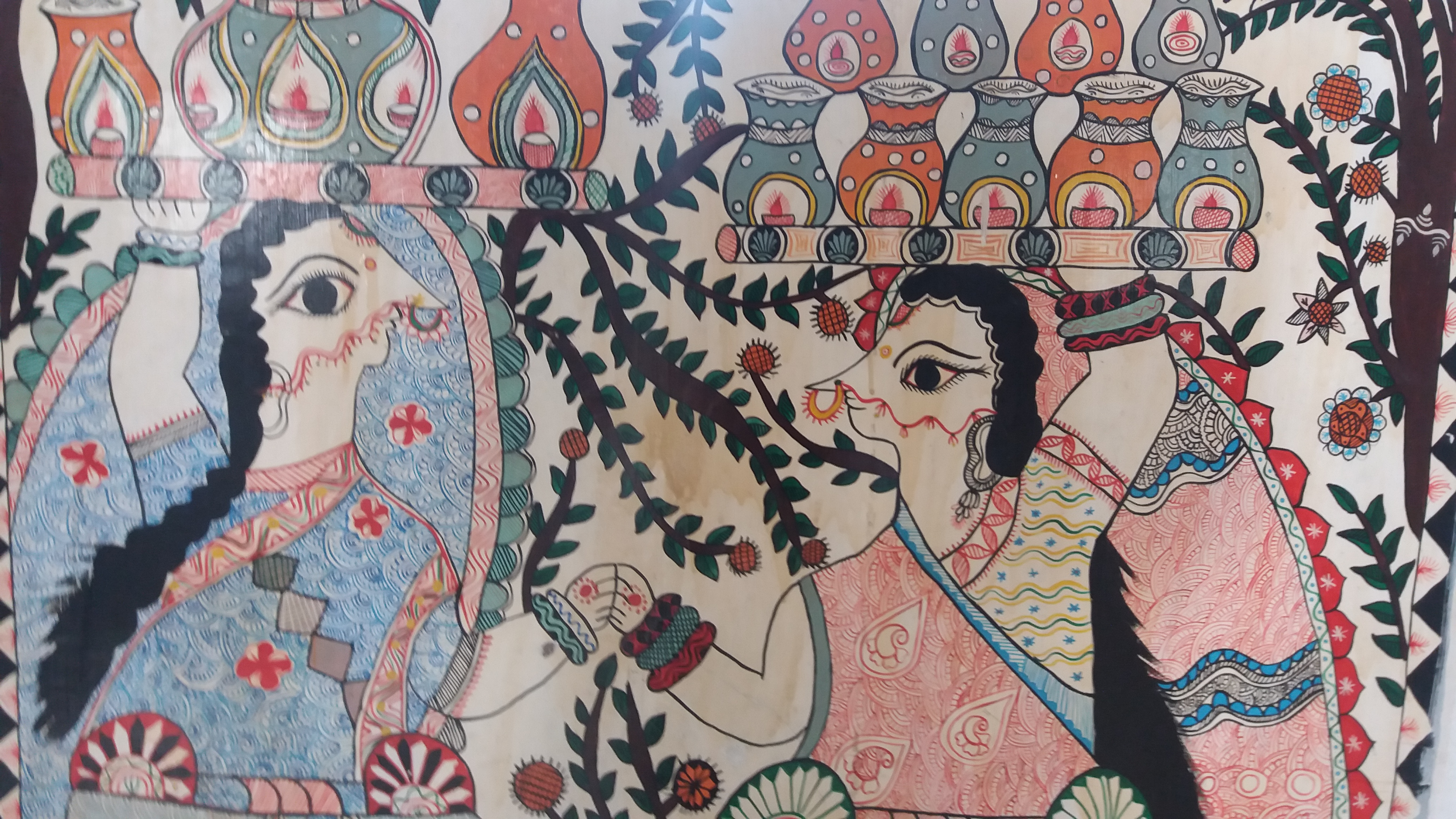
Mithila art

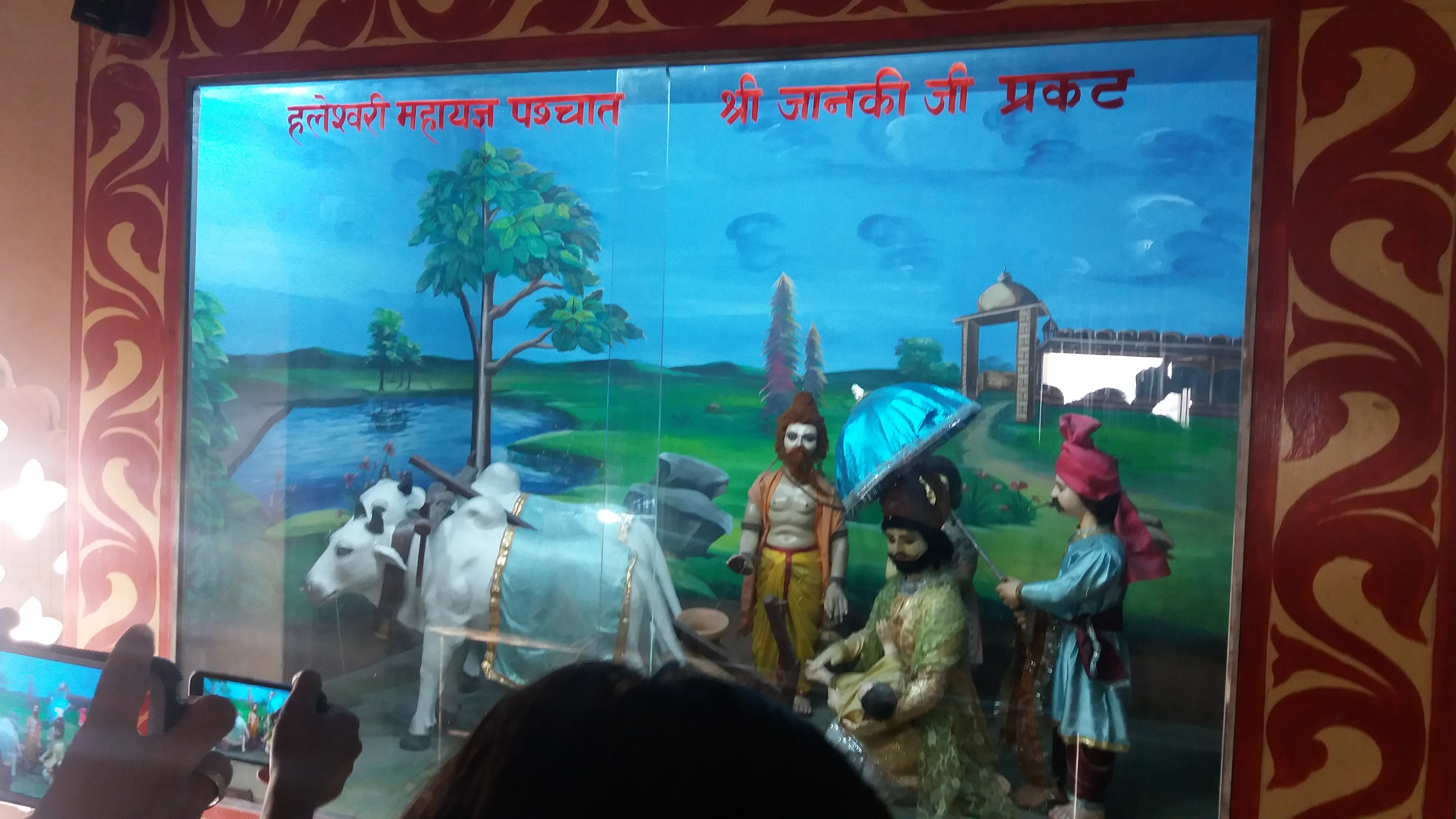
Picture depicting King Janak ploughing to discover Sita Mata

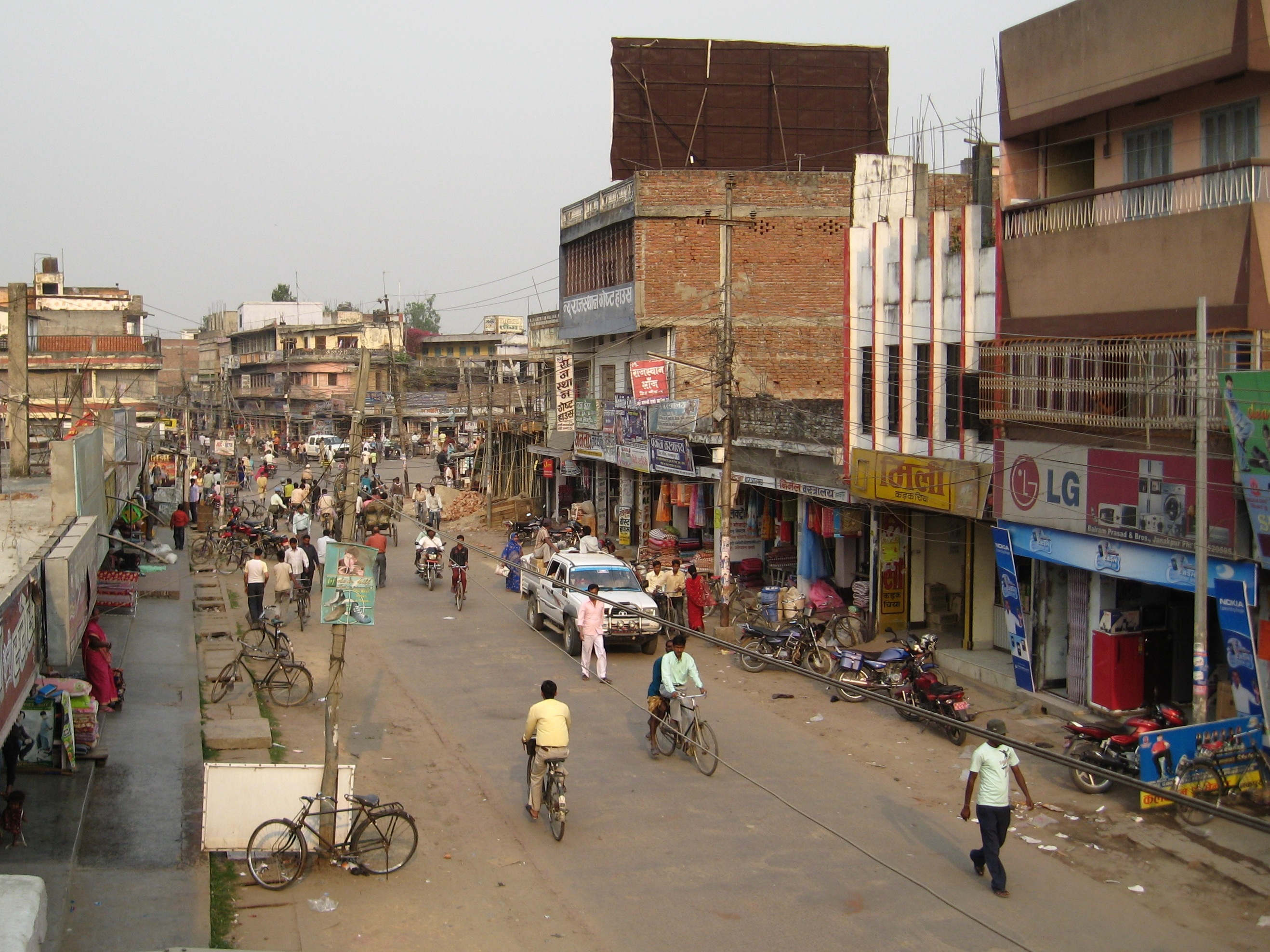
Janakpur in 2000's

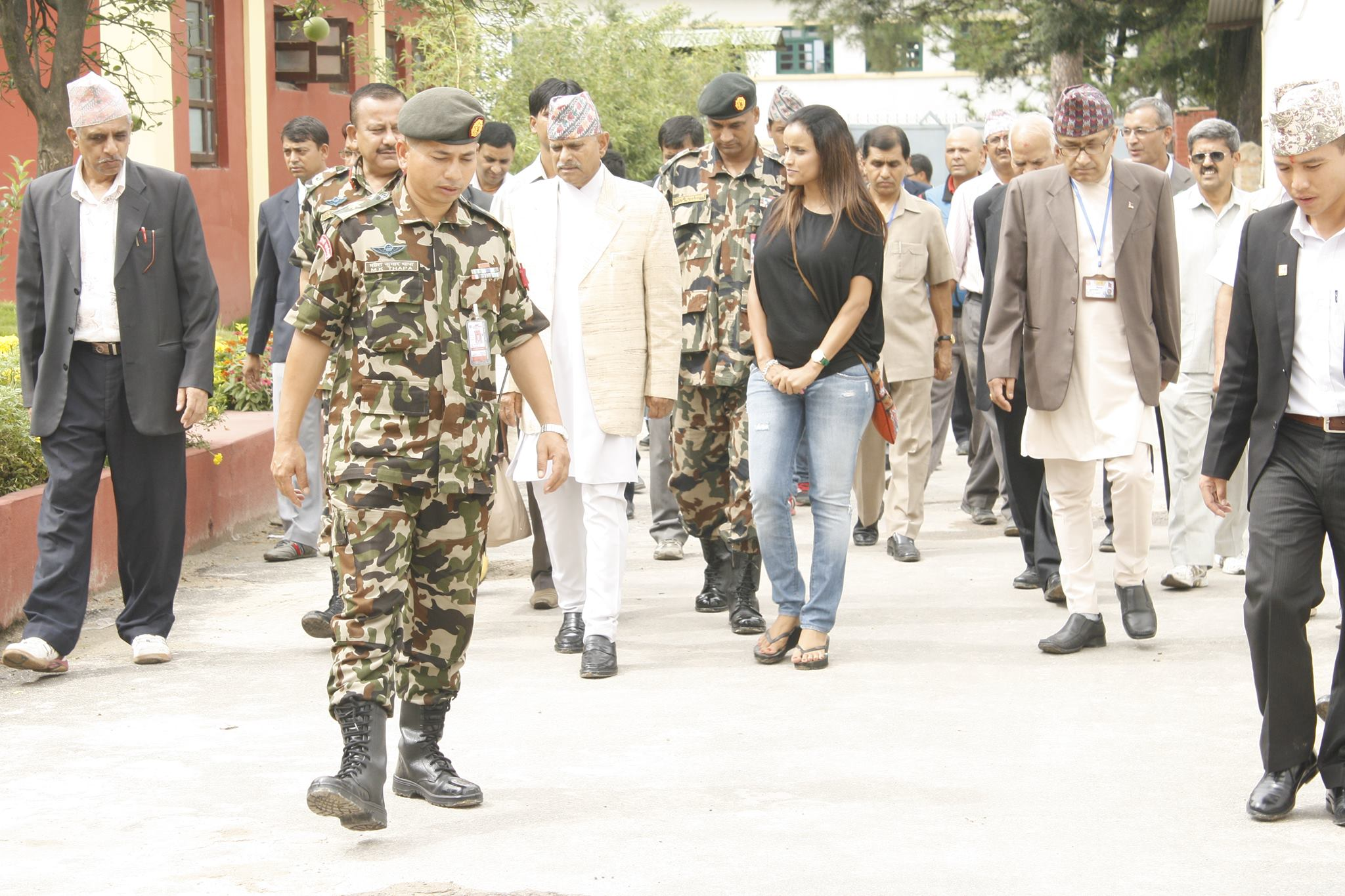
First president of Republic Nepal, Ram Baran Yadav visiting Janakpur

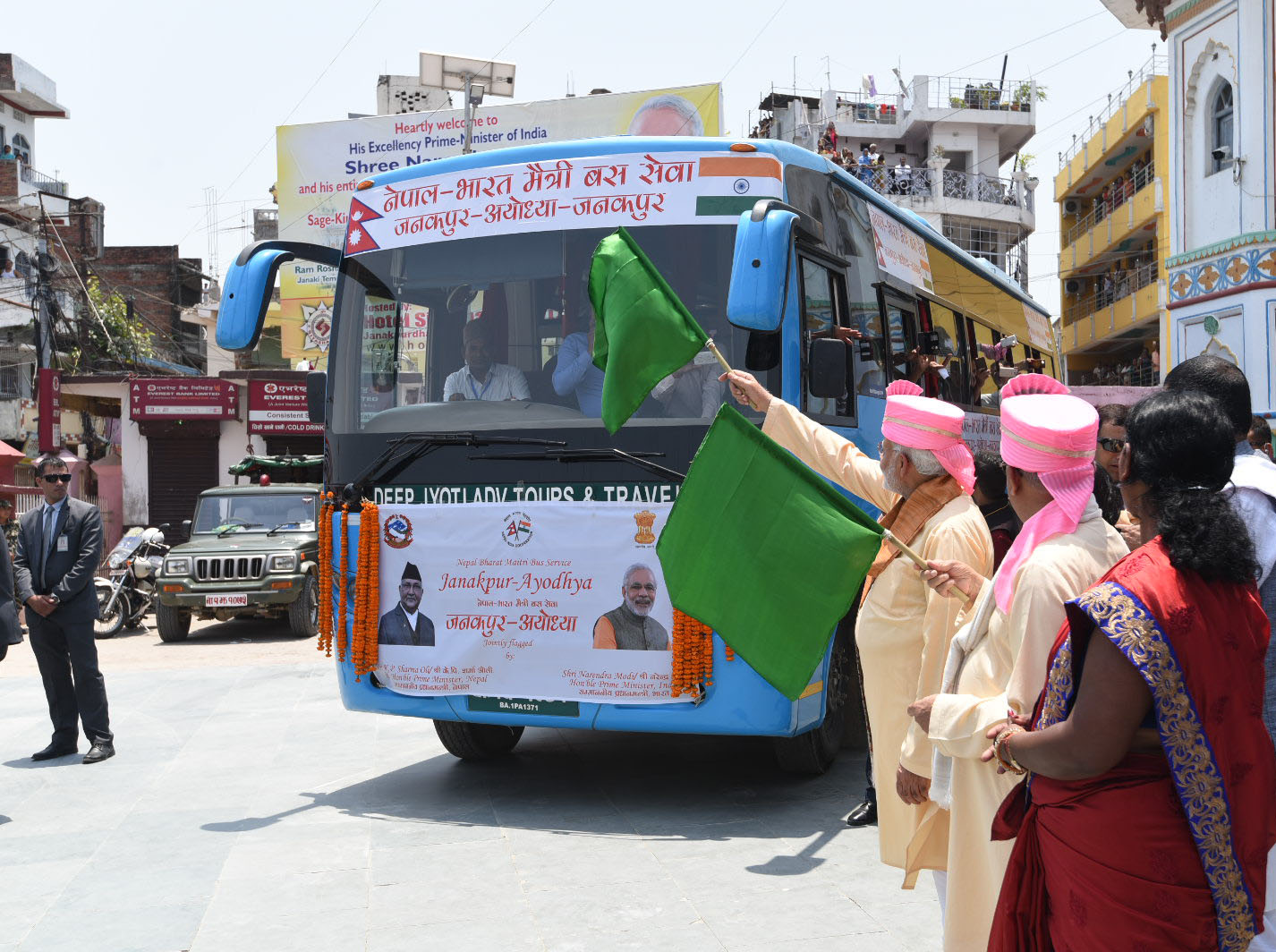
Janakpur-Ayodhya bus

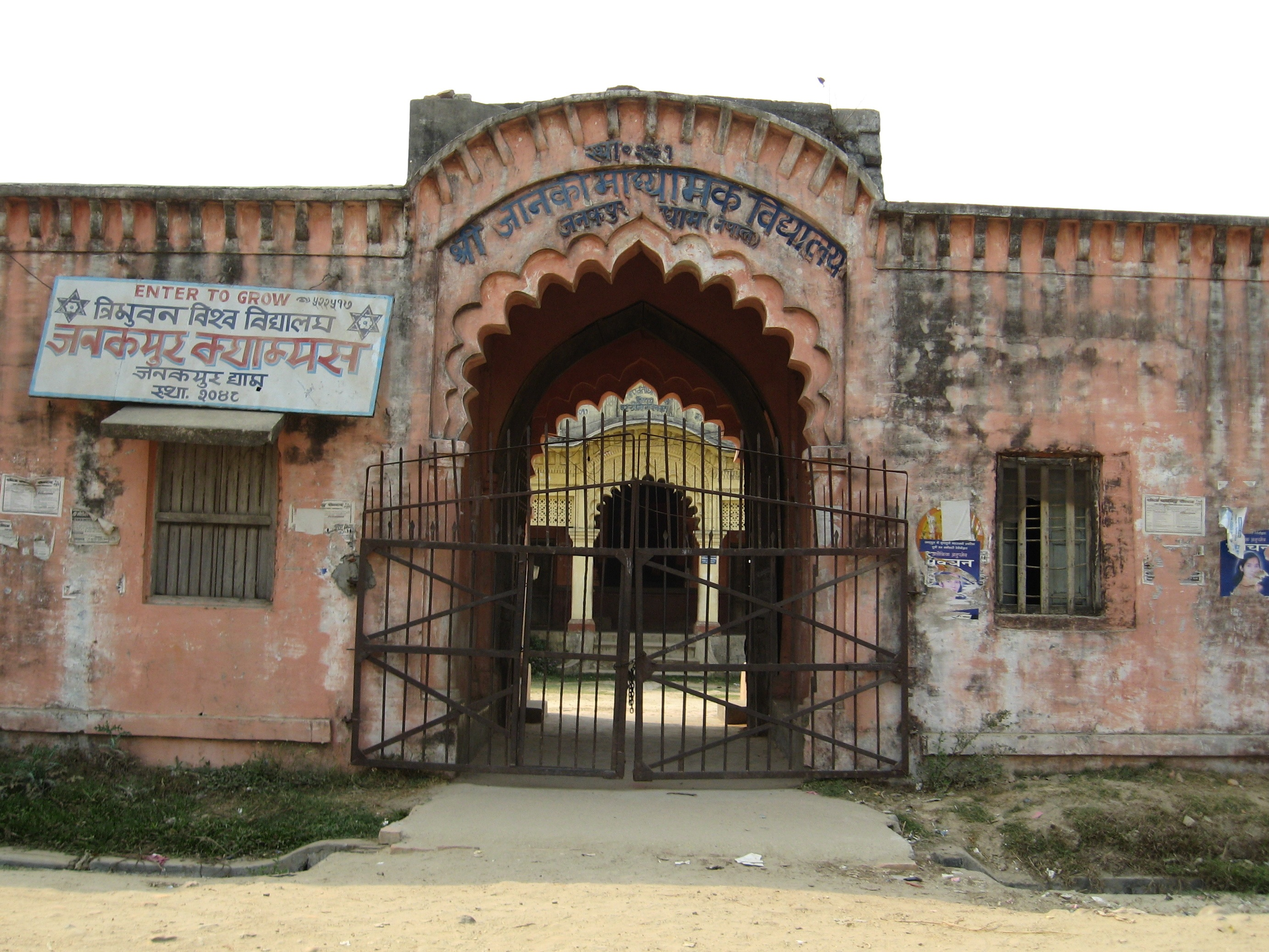
Old picture of Janaki High School

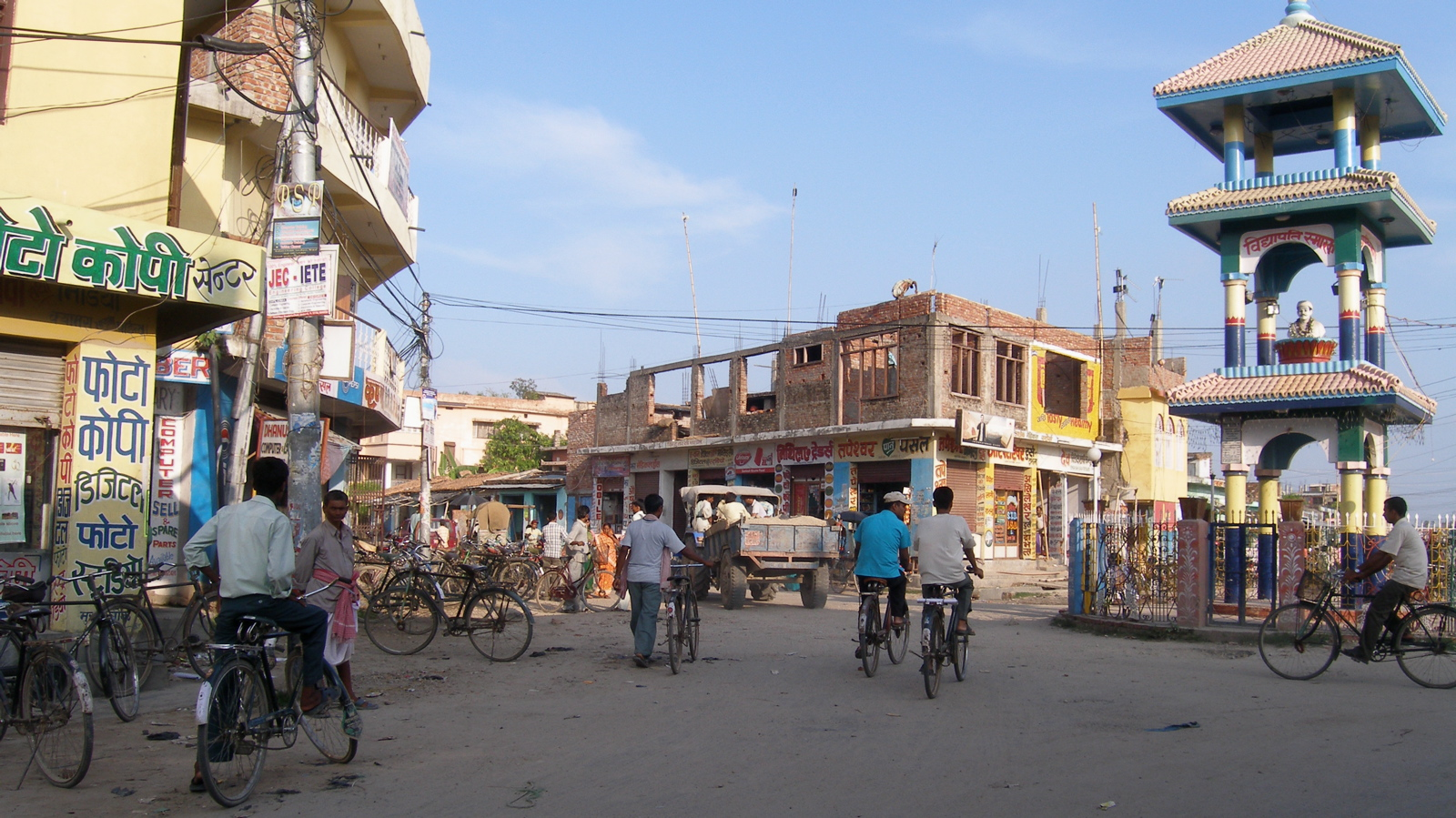
Murali Chowk in 2000's

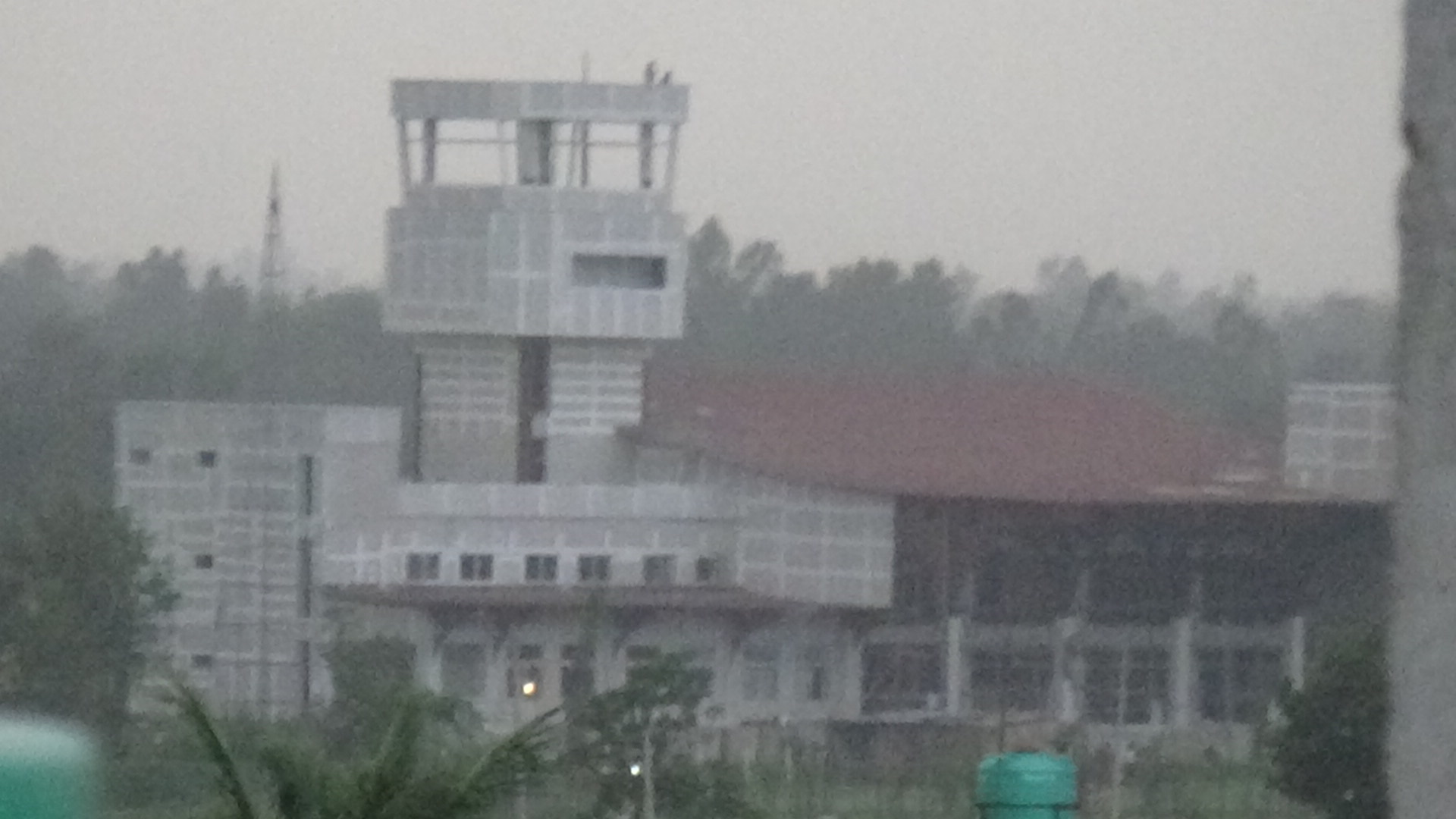
Construction of New Airport buildings

== See also ==
- List of cities in Nepal
- Janakpur–Jaynagar Railway
- Mithila Madhya Parikrama
- Sitamarhi Dham Parikrama
- Punaura Dham, birthplace of Sita
- Parikrama
- Yatra
- Barah Bigha
- Ramanand Chowk
