= Ramanand Chowk =

Iconic gateway in the city of Janakpur in Mithila

- रामानन्द चौक
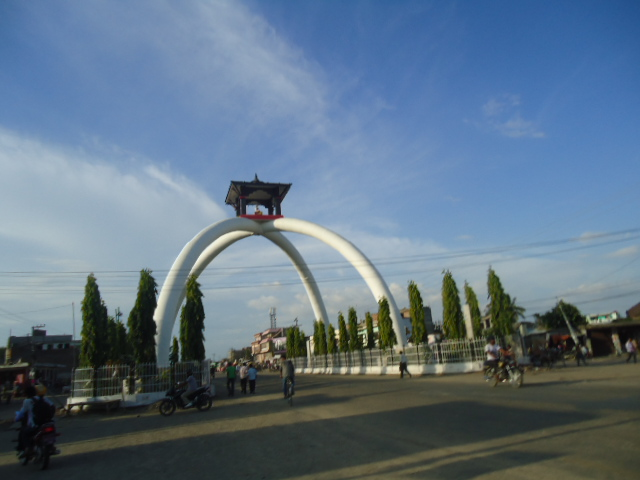
- View of the iconic gateway of the Ramanand Chowk in the city of Janakpur (Mithila), Nepal.

Religion
- Affiliation: Hinduism
- Deity: Ramanand Vaishnava

Location
- Location: Janakpur
- Interactive map of Ramanand Chowk
- Coordinates: 26.7359607°N 85.9189392°E

The Ramanand Chowk (Maithili: रामानन्द चौक) in the city of Janakpur, refers to the iconic gate on the national highway called Bhithamod-Dhalkebar road connecting to Kathmandu in Nepal. The iconic gateway serves as the main crossroads in the city. The vicinity around the chowk is a major commercial hub in the city. The chowk is the major location from where the tourists and pilgrimage arriving in the city, go to the historical and religious Barah Bigha, Janaki Mandir and Ram Mandir. It was built in the later period of the modern era. It is about 1300 metres distance from the Janaki Mandir.

On the top of the Ramanand Chowk gateway, there is a Hindu temple dedicated to Ramanand Vaishnava. The iconic gate is very tall in height. The structure of the temple on top of the gate is built in the Nepalese architectural style of pagoda.

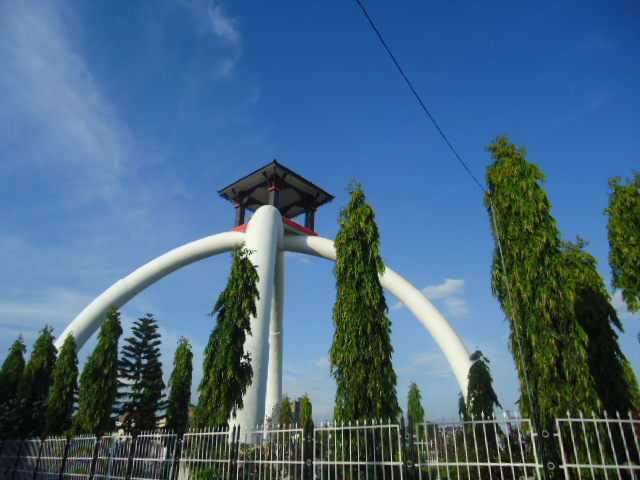
Closer view of the iconic gateway.

== Etymology ==
The Ramanand Chowk was coined after the name of the prominent Hindu devotional Vaishnava saint cum poet Ramanandacharya.

== History ==
According to the Mahanth of the Janaki Mandir, there was a hut temple in a garden at the present site of the iconic gateway structure before Bikram Sambat 2025. The location was a field. Around the vicinity of the field there were older religious places of the Agni Kund and the Dulhadulahi Mandir.

The Ramanand Chowk Gateway is a modern architecture in the city of Janakpur in the Mithila region of Nepal. It is a architectural heritage of the city.
