= Barah Bigha =

Historical ground in Janakpur

- Rangbhoomi Maidan
- बारह बीघा
- Interactive map of Barah Bigha
- Type: Historical ground
- Location: Janakpur
- Coordinates: 26.7365635°N 85.9232401°E
- Etymology: Twelve Bigha

Barah Bigha (Maithili: बारह बीघा) or Bara Bigha is a historical ground in the holy city of Janakpur in the Himalayan nation Nepal. It is popular for organising religious and grand ceremonies in the city. During the festival of Vivah Panchami, it is a major place where the Ram Baraat Yatra coming from different parts of India and Nepal gathered in the city. The historical ground of Barah Bigha is also known as Rangbhoomi Maidan.

The grand open ground of Barah Bigha lies at a side on the path connecting Ramanand Chowk to Janaki Mandir in Janakpur.

== History ==
On 11 May in the year 2018, the ground witnessed a historic speech delivered by the Indian prime minister Narendra Modi at the ground, during his visit to the city of Janakpur in the Mithila region of Nepal.
