= Sita Ram Vivah Mandap =

Hindu shrine in Janakpur

Coordinates: 26.7310°N 85.9251°E

- सीता राम विवाह मंडप
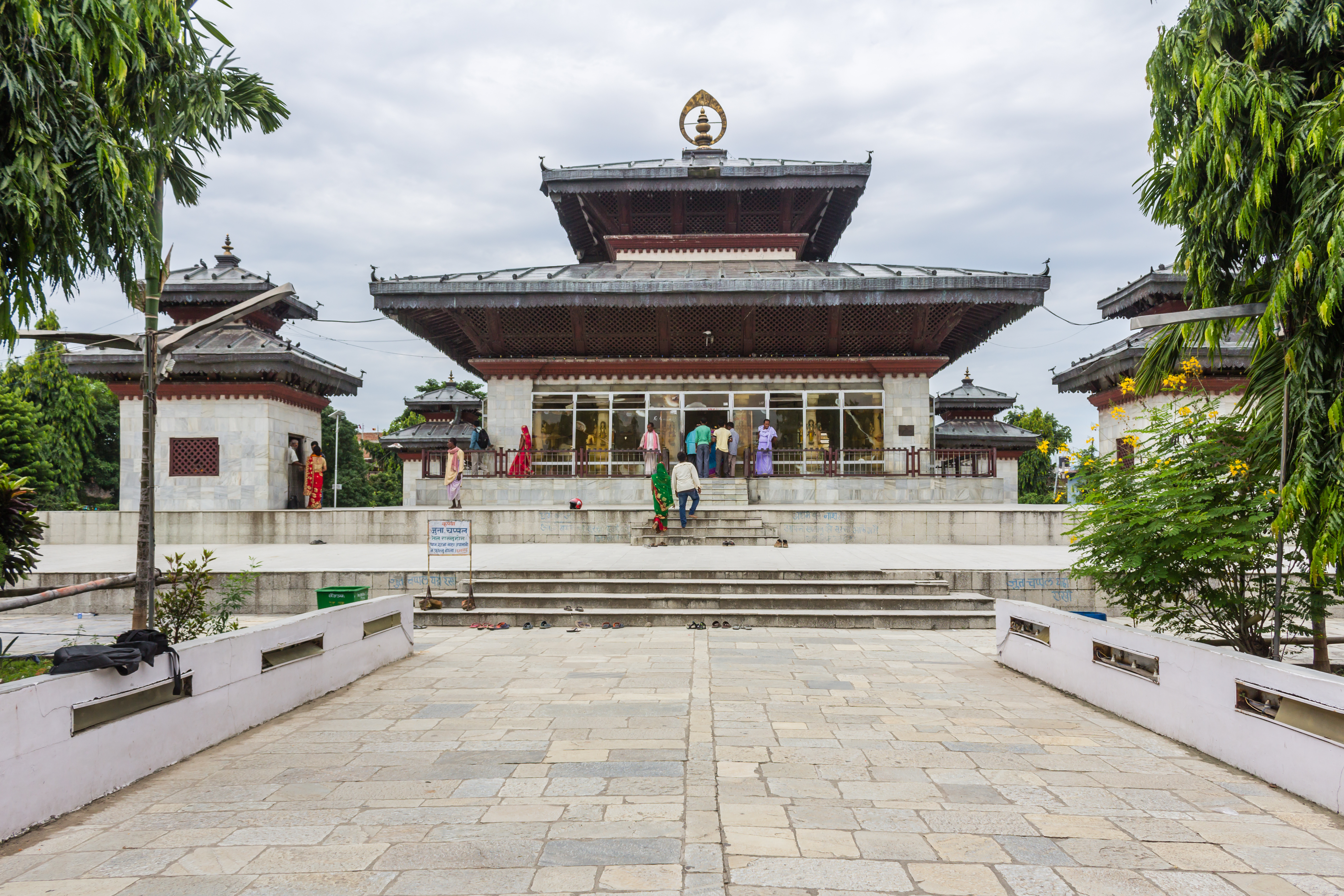
- Exterior view in 2016.

Religion
- Affiliation: Hinduism
- District: Dhanusha District
- Province: Madhesh Pradesh
- Deity: Lord Rama and Goddess Sita
- Festival: Vivah Panchmi

Location
- Location: Janakpur
- Country: Nepal
- Interactive map of Sita Ram Vivah Mandap

Sita Ram Vivah Mandap (Maithili: सीता राम विवाह मंडप) or simply Vivah Mandap is a Hindu shrine in the Mithila region of the Indian subcontinent. It located adjacent to the Janaki Mandir in the city of Janakpur in the Dhanusha district of the Madhesh Pradesh province in Nepal. It is a major destination of the Ramayana circuit in the subcontinent. It is dedicated to the legacy of the legendary marriage between the divine couple of Lord Rama and Goddess Sita in the epic Ramayana. It is locally also called as Marwa.

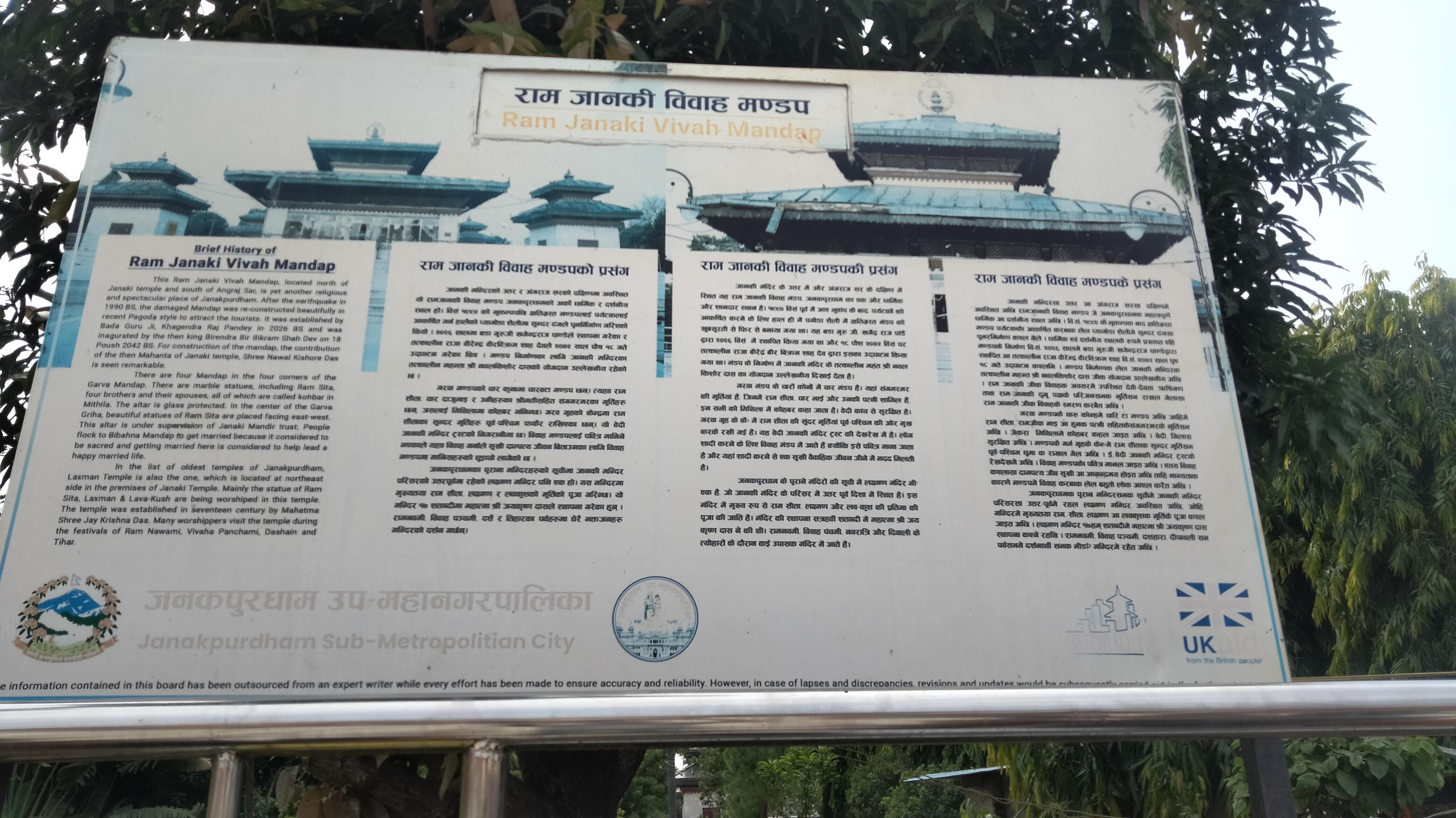
Onsite inscription board

== History ==
According to the inscription board, it is officially named as Ram Janaki Vivah Mandap. In 1934 (1990 BS), the earlier mandap was destroyed due to the earthquake in the region. The present pagoda styled mandap was established in 1969 (2026 BS) by Bada Guru ji Khagendra Rai Pandey. It was inaugurated by the then King Birendra Bir Bikram Shahdev of the earlier Nepal Kingdom on 18 Poush 2042 BS.

The mandap was constructed by the contribution of the then Mahanth Shree Nawal Kishore Das of the Janaki Mandir.
