= Indo-Nepal Border Gate, Jaleshwar =

Indo-Nepal border gateway

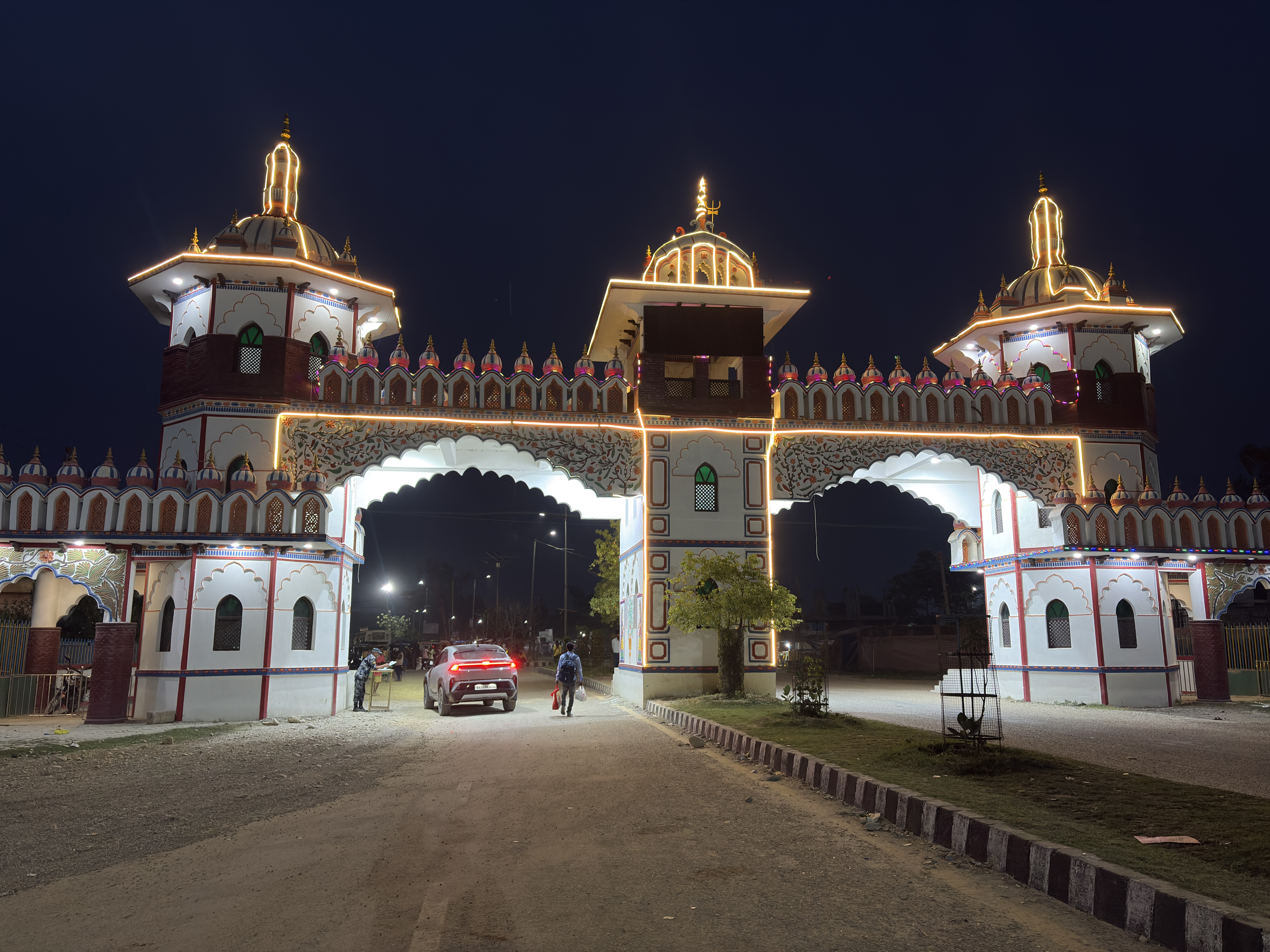
- View of the Indo-Nepal border gateway at Jaleshwar-Bhitthamore Bhansar.
- Interactive map of the Indo-Nepal Border Gate, Jaleshwar area
- Alternative names: Jaleshwar-Bhitthamore Bhansar Pravesh Dwar

General information
- Status: Completed
- Location: Indo-Nepal border, Dasgaja, Maliwara village, Ward No 3, Jaleshwar Municipality, Mahottari district, Nepal
- Coordinates: 26.6330631°N 85.7736952°E

Indo-Nepal Border Gate also known as Jaleshwar-Bhitthamore Bhansar Pravesh Dwar is an iconic gateway to enter the land of Nepal from the Bhitthamore border town in the Sitamarhi district of Bihar. It is located adjacent to the Nepal's Customs office at the outskirts of the Jaleshwar town in Nepal. The border gate is built in the style of the iconic Janaki Mandir in Janakpur. It is decorated as an artistic entrance gateway to Nepal. The artistic decoration of the border gate attracts tourists coming in the region for photography. The border gate serves as a check point for cross-border transportation between the two countries India and Nepal.

It is one of the 24 major border check posts of Nepal along the border of India. In the Indian border side, a dry port known as Bhitthamore Land Port is being constructed by the Government of India to enhance the cross -border trades and goods transportations for economic activities in the region by the mutual cooperation between the two nations.

== Description ==
The border gate is situated in the Mithila region of the Indian subcontinent. According to the engineer Shravan Kumar Yadav involved in the construction of the gate, it was built with a concept similar to the look of Janaki Mandir, so that the Indian tourists coming to Nepal from Bhitthamore side will experience the feelings of entering into Mithila. The walls of the gate are decorated with the Mithila arts and paintings.

After the completion of the construction, the border gate was transferred under the control of the Nepal's Customs Office at the Maliwara village of the Jaleshwar Municipality. In Nepal, the customs offices are generally called as bhansar. It is maintained by the customs office and is looked after by the security forces of Nepal.

== Construction ==
The border gate was constructed into two phases at the total cost of Nepalese rupees 1 crore 88 lakhs 33 thousands. The tender for the construction of the gate was released in the Nepalese fiscal year Bikram Samvat 2076/77. The construction of the gate was completed in 2 years.

The first phase of the construction was completed by the construction company Dragon Atreya. Similarly the second phase was completed by the other company known as RPS RS JV.
