= Ratnawati River =

River flowing in Mithila

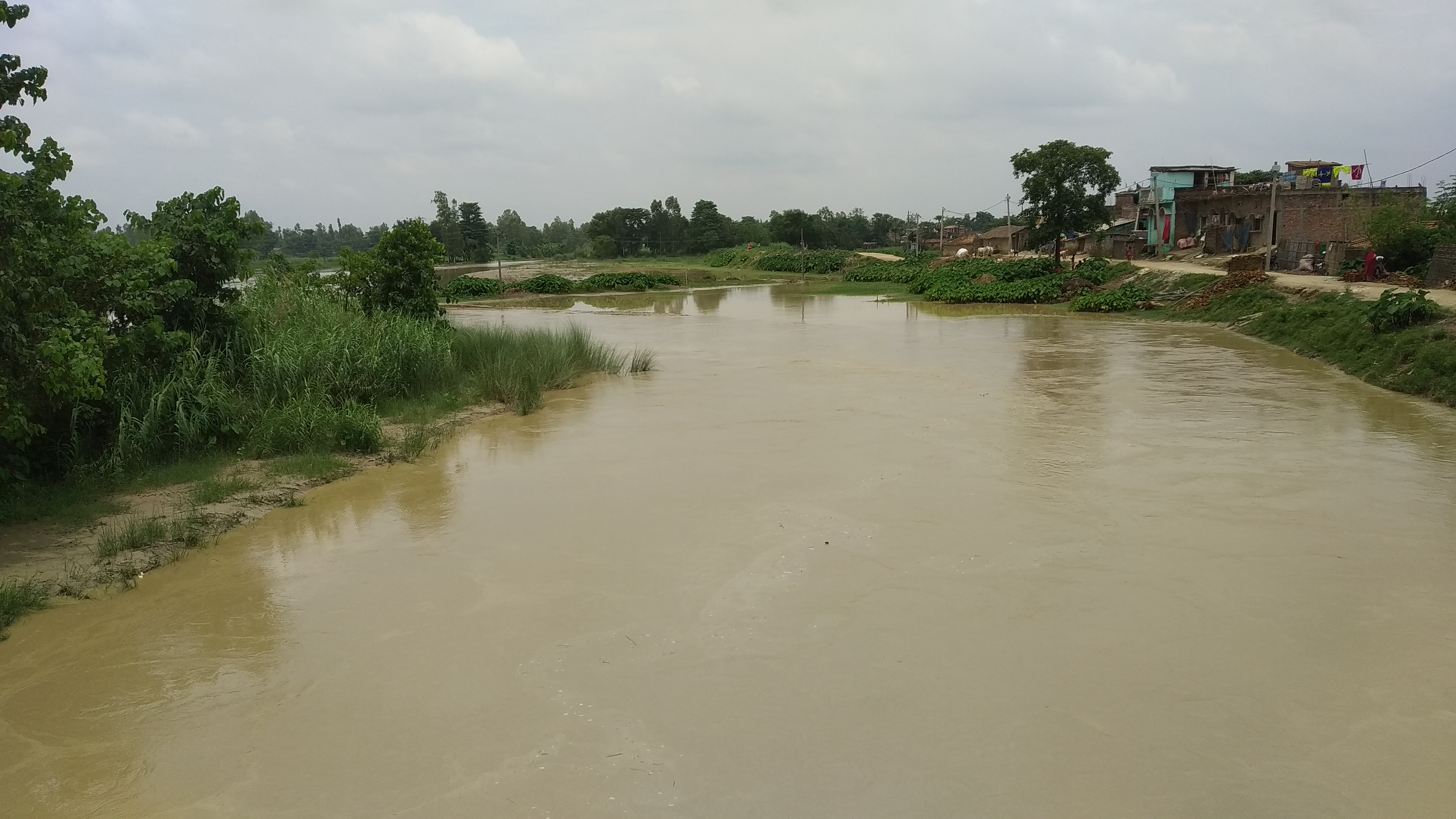
- Raato River at Indo-Nepal border

Location
- Country: Nepal, India
- Region: Madhesh, Mithila

Physical characteristics
- Mouth: Nepal

Basin features
- Progression: Bihar, India
- River system: Perennial
- Landmarks: Jaleswor, Bhitthamore

The Ratnawati River or Raato river is a perennial river that originates in the Himalayan range of Nepal and terminates in the Indian states of Bihar. It is a part of Adhwara group of rivers in the Mithila region.

The river often remains in the headlines due to floods during the rainy season.

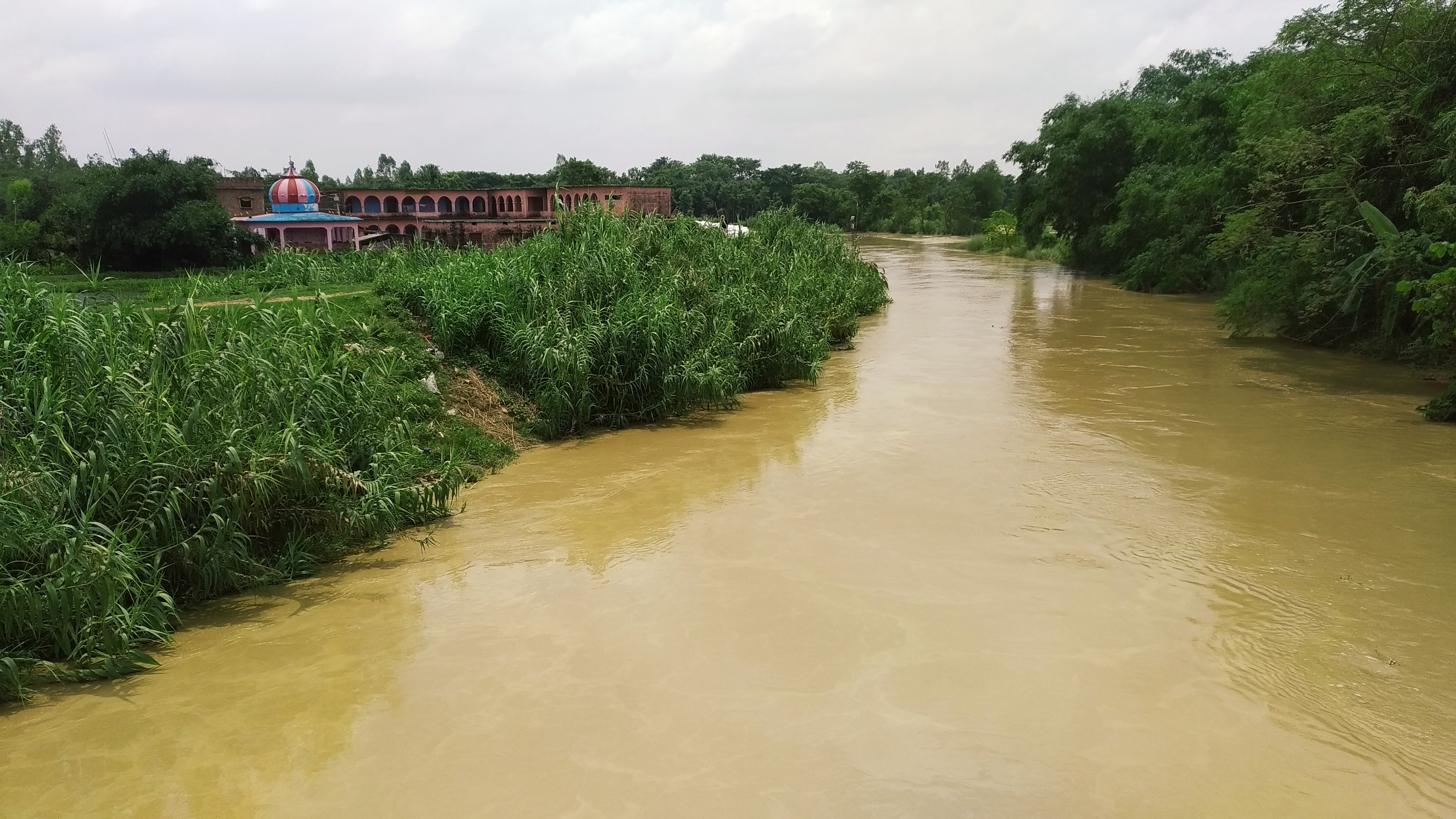
Raato river in Bhitthamore
