= Adhwara =

Group of rivers in the Indian subcontinent

Adhwara (Maithili: अधवारा) refers to a group of rivers flowing on the plane of the Mithila region in the Indian subcontinent. It is not a single river but a collective term for the interconnected waterways in the region. They originate in the foothills of the Himalayas in Nepal before entering India.

== Description ==
Adhwara is a group of one and a half dozen small and big rivers flowing in the Mithila region. According to legend, it is mentioned in Vedas and Puranas. It is also known as Chhoti Ganga of the region. The rivers of the Adhwara group remain in spate during heavy rains in the Mithila region or in the Terai region of Nepal. During this period, it causes several destruction in the region due to huge floods caused by over flow from these rivers. The major rivers or streams of the Adhwara group are Bigghi, Dhouns, Thumhani, Khiroi, Kokra, Bachharaja, Lakhandei, Marha, Hardi, Raato, Jhim, Lalbakaiya and Jamuni, etc.

The Adhwara group is one of the eight river basins in the Flood Management Information System (FMIS) focus area of Bihar. About 70% of discharge of the group passes through the Khiroi river and rest of 30% discharge passes through the Dhouns river that meets at Akharharghat.

== Floods ==
The topography of major part of the Mithila region is flat. Due to having the flat topography, the rivers of the Adhwara group cause widespread submergence in the region during monsoon season. During heavy rains in Nepal, these rivers bring several floods in the Mithila region due to excess water in these streams.
