= Kalidas Dih =

Historical Landmark related to the Great Sanskrit Scholar Kalidas

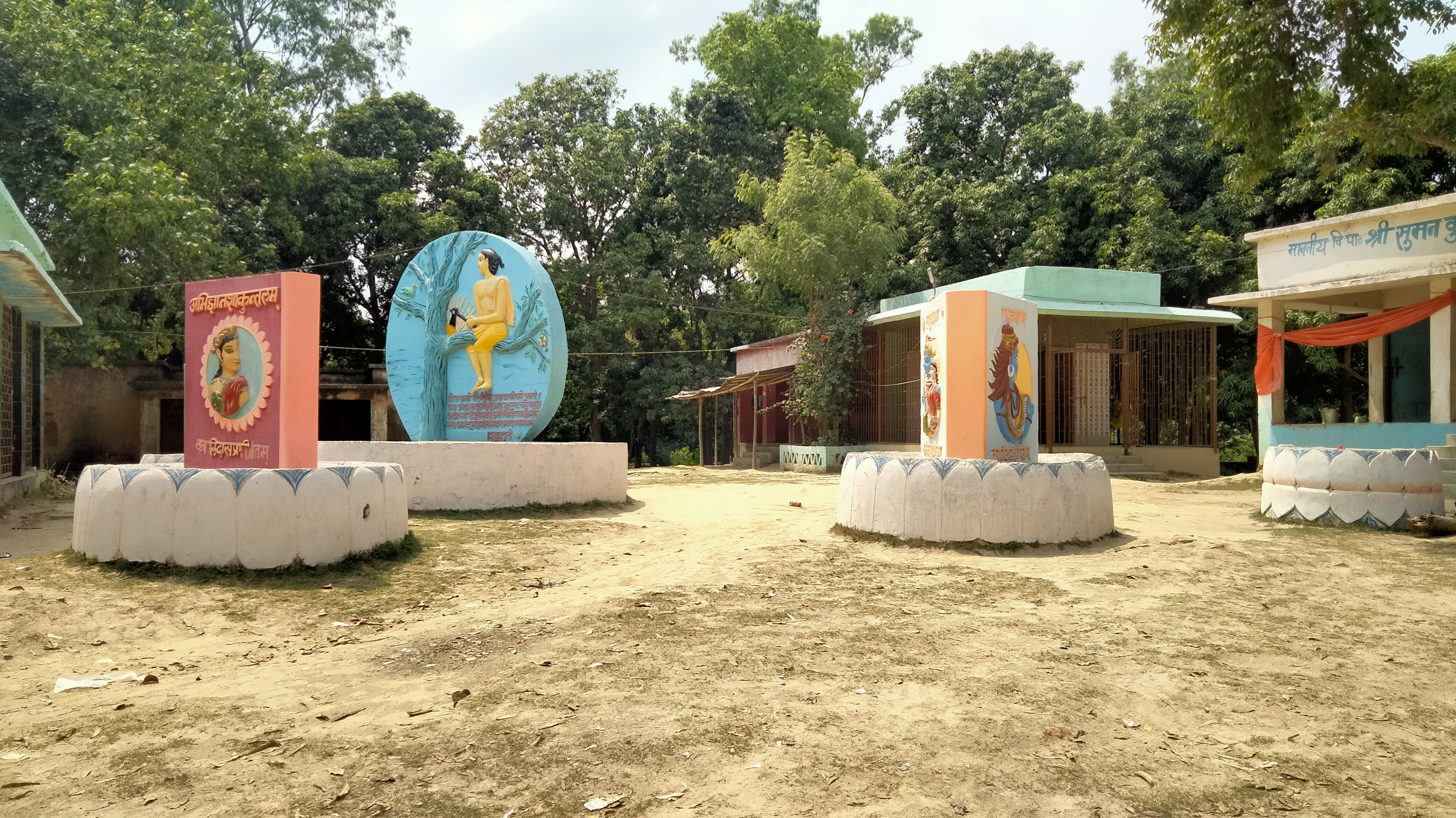
- Kalidas Dih campus having statues

Religion
- Affiliation: Hinduism
- District: Madhubani
- Deity: Kalidasa
- Festival: Mahakavi Kalidas Mahotsva
- Governing body: Government of Bihar

Location
- State: Bihar
- Country: India
- Interactive map of Kalidas Dih
- Coordinates: 26.4599318°N 85.8796106°E
- Also known as Kalidas Garhi

Kalidas Dih also known as Kalidas Garhi is a historical and holy place located approximately in Uchchaith Sthan village in the Madhubani district of the Mithila region in state of Bihar in India. It is associated with the Sanskrit scholar, playwright and dramatist Kalidasa. It is at a distance of 5 kilometres by road from the headquarter of the sub divisional town Benipatti.

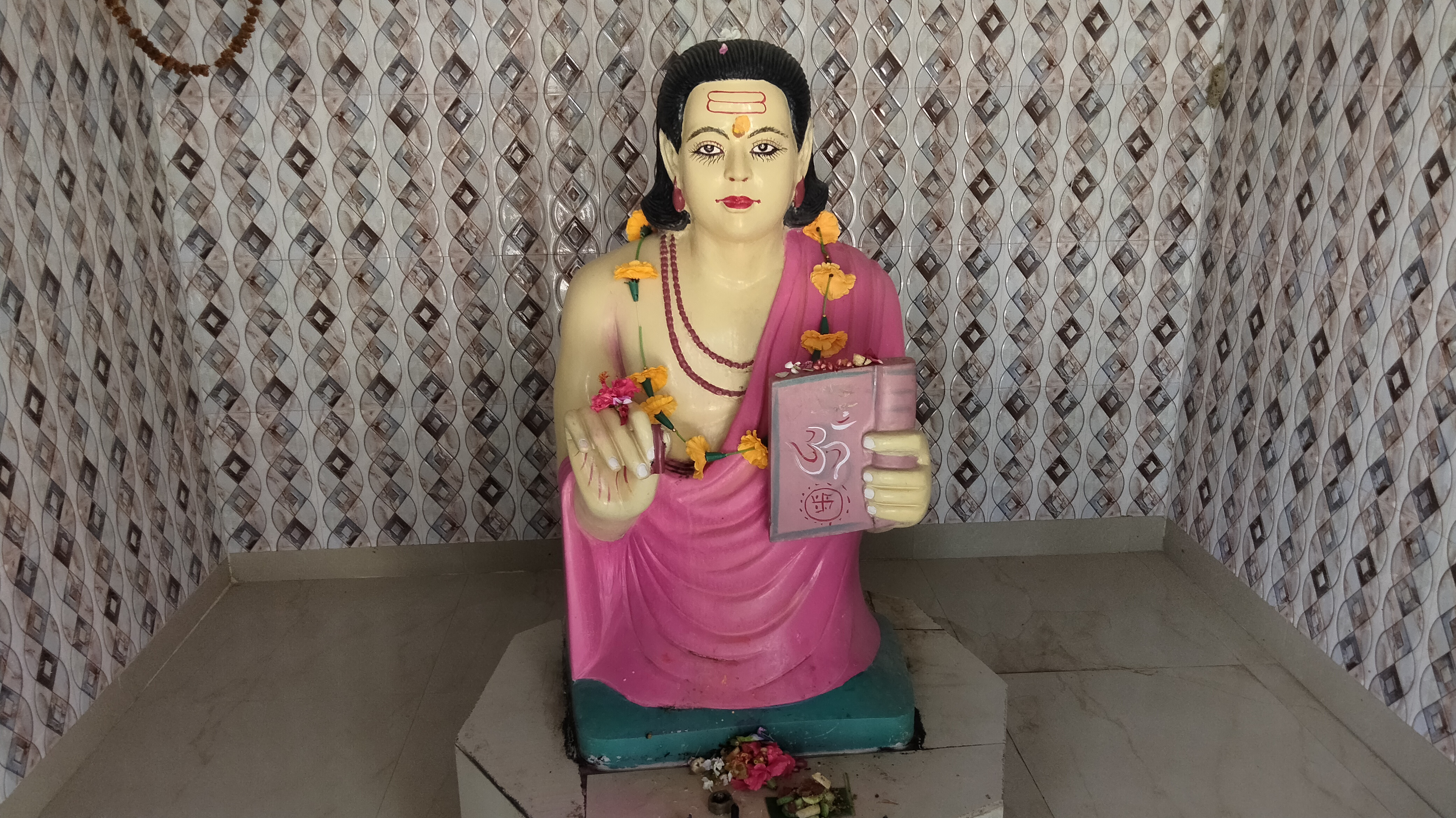
Idol of Kalidasa in the Kalidas Mandir at the campus of the Kalidas Dih

== Description ==
In this village, there is a mud mound known as Kalidas Dih. It is located on the eastern bank of the Thumhani river flowing through the village. In the north direction of the dih, there is the ancient temple of Maa Chinnamastika Bhagwati on the western bank of the river.

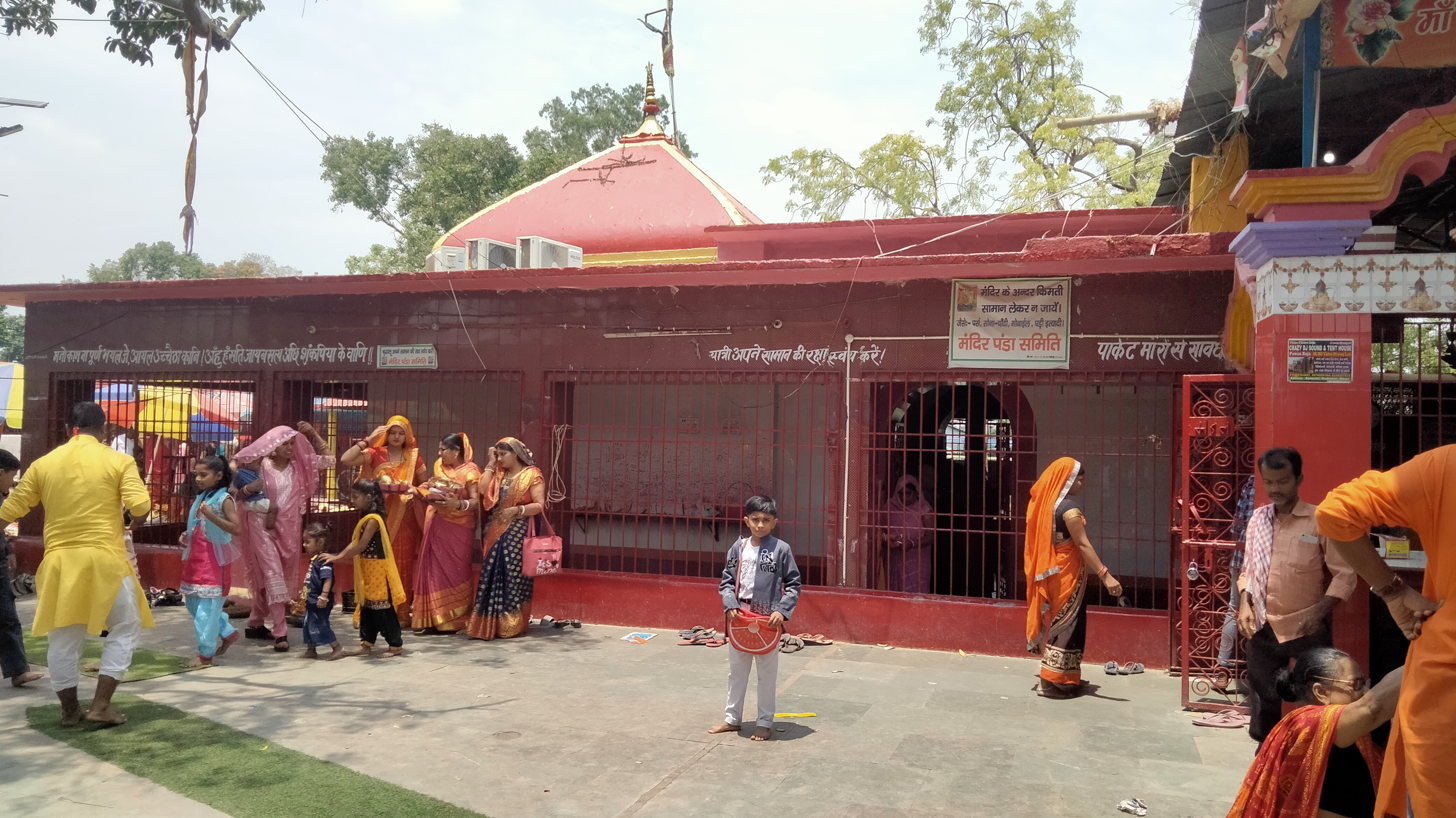
Uchchaith Bhagwati Mandir

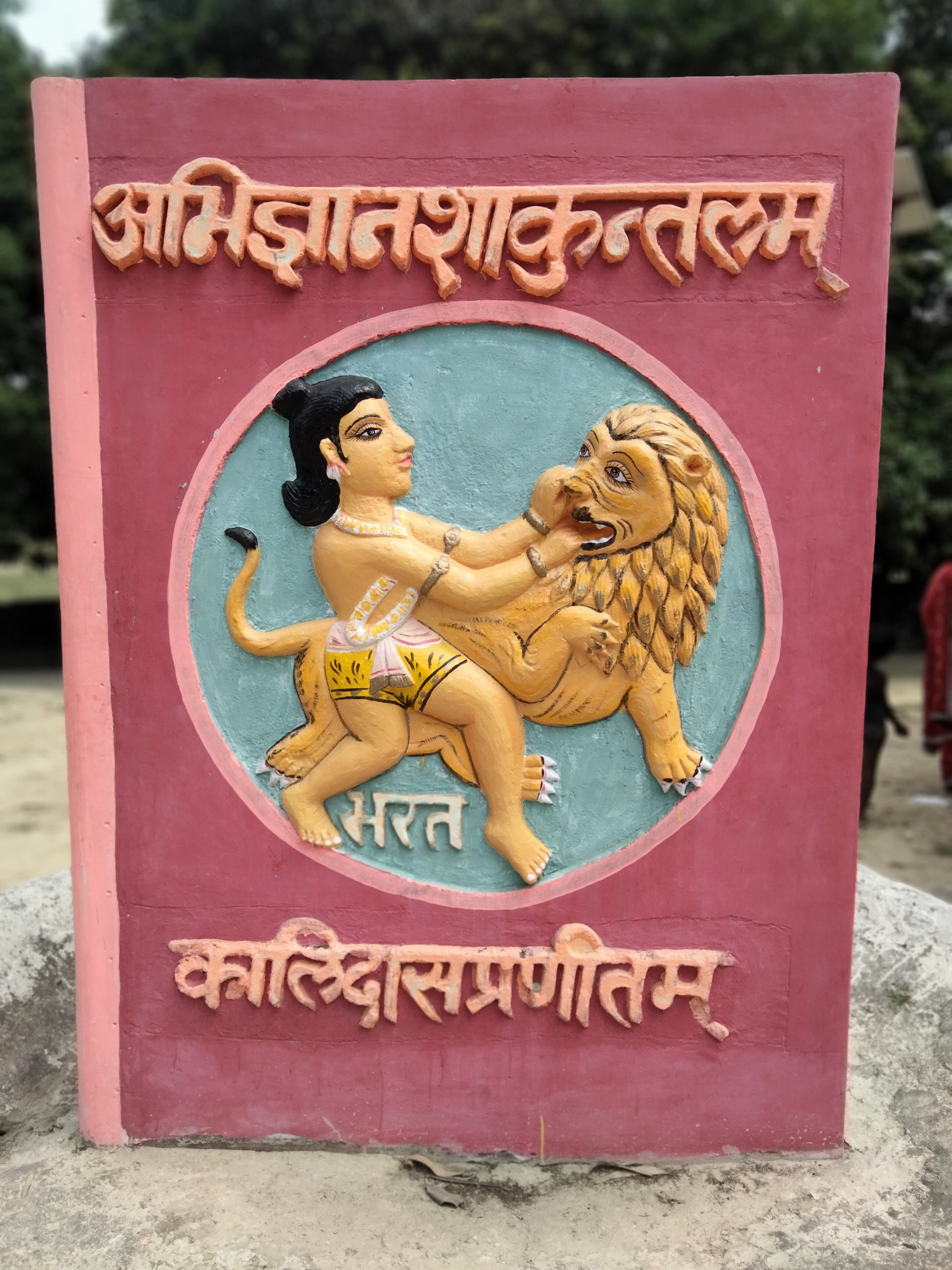
Statue of the Abhijñānaśākuntalam book at the Kalidas Dih

There are statues of Kalidasa and his works in the campus of the dih. It is believed that Kalidasa wrote most of his books here. It is one of the memorial monument of Kalidasa. He got enlightenment here by the blessings of Uchchaith Bhagwati. He spent his earlier life in a Gurukul near the site. The ancient Gurukul is presently converted into a modern college known as Kalidas Vidyapati Science College. It is situated at a distance of 200 metres towards the north direction from the location of the Kalidas Dih. Every year in the month of October, Bihar Government organises a government festival in the memory of Kalidasa known as Mahakavi Kalidas Mahotsav. This place has been recognised as a tourist centre for Hindu pilgrims.

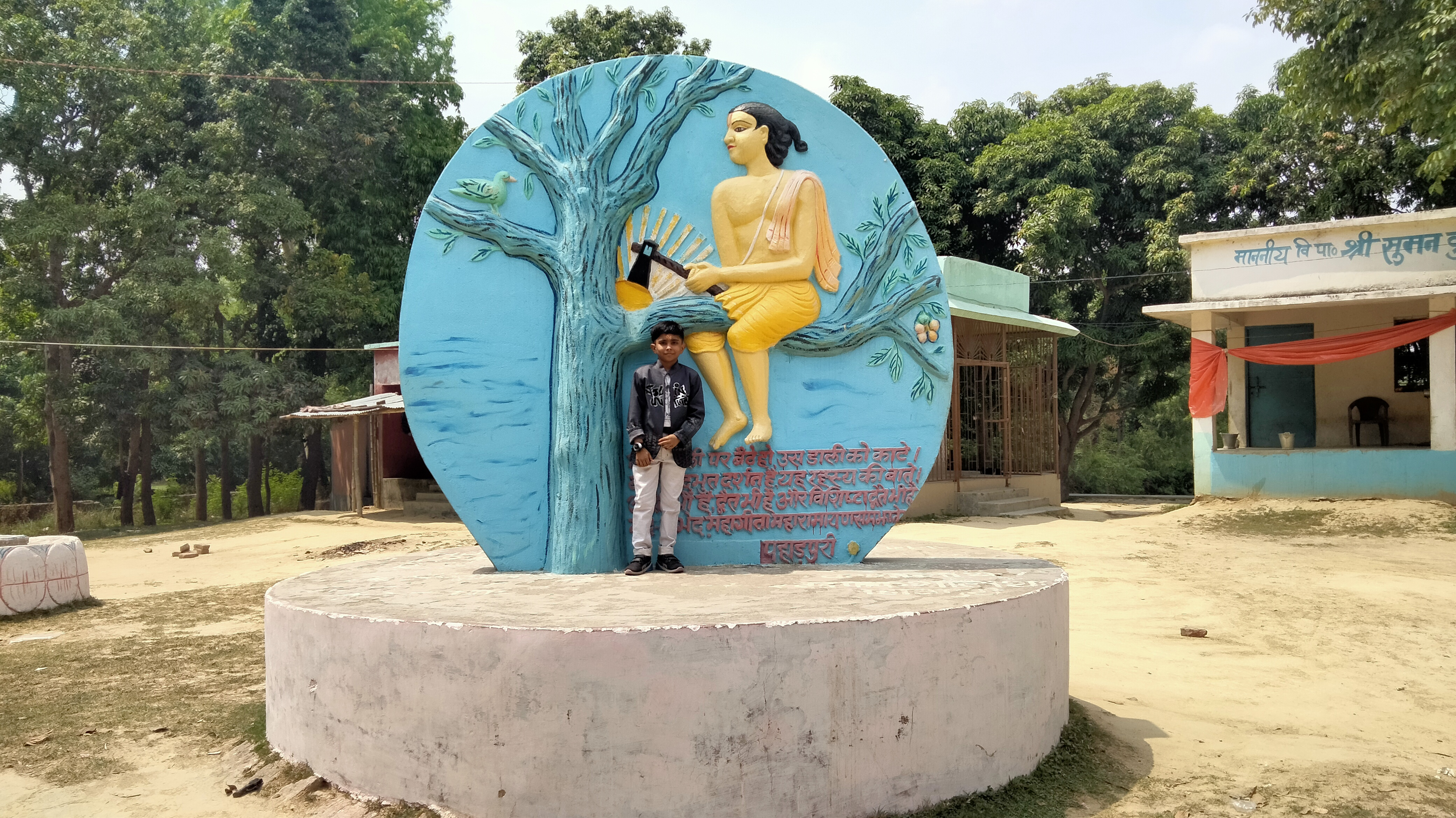
Statue of Kalidasa depicting his early life

The Kalidas Dih is claimed as the birthplace of the renowned Sanskrit scholar Kalidas. The claim has been asserted by the former vice chancellor Acharya Mithila Prasad Tripathi of the Maharshi Panini Sanskrit & Vedic University in Ujjain, during his visit at the conference cum Shastrartha held on the occasion of Uchchaith Mahotsav in the village. The people of this area have several times demanded from the Government of Bihar to get Kalidas Dih excavated archaeologically and get it developed as a tourist spot through the tourism department. In the year 2011-12, the chief minister Nitish Kumar inspected the site during his journey Seva Yatra in the region but archaeological excavation of the Kalidas Dih has yet not been done. In 2024, the BJP MLA Vinod Narayan Jha of the Benipatti Assembly Constituency demanded for the excavation of the dih by the archaeological department of the state from the Government of Bihar.

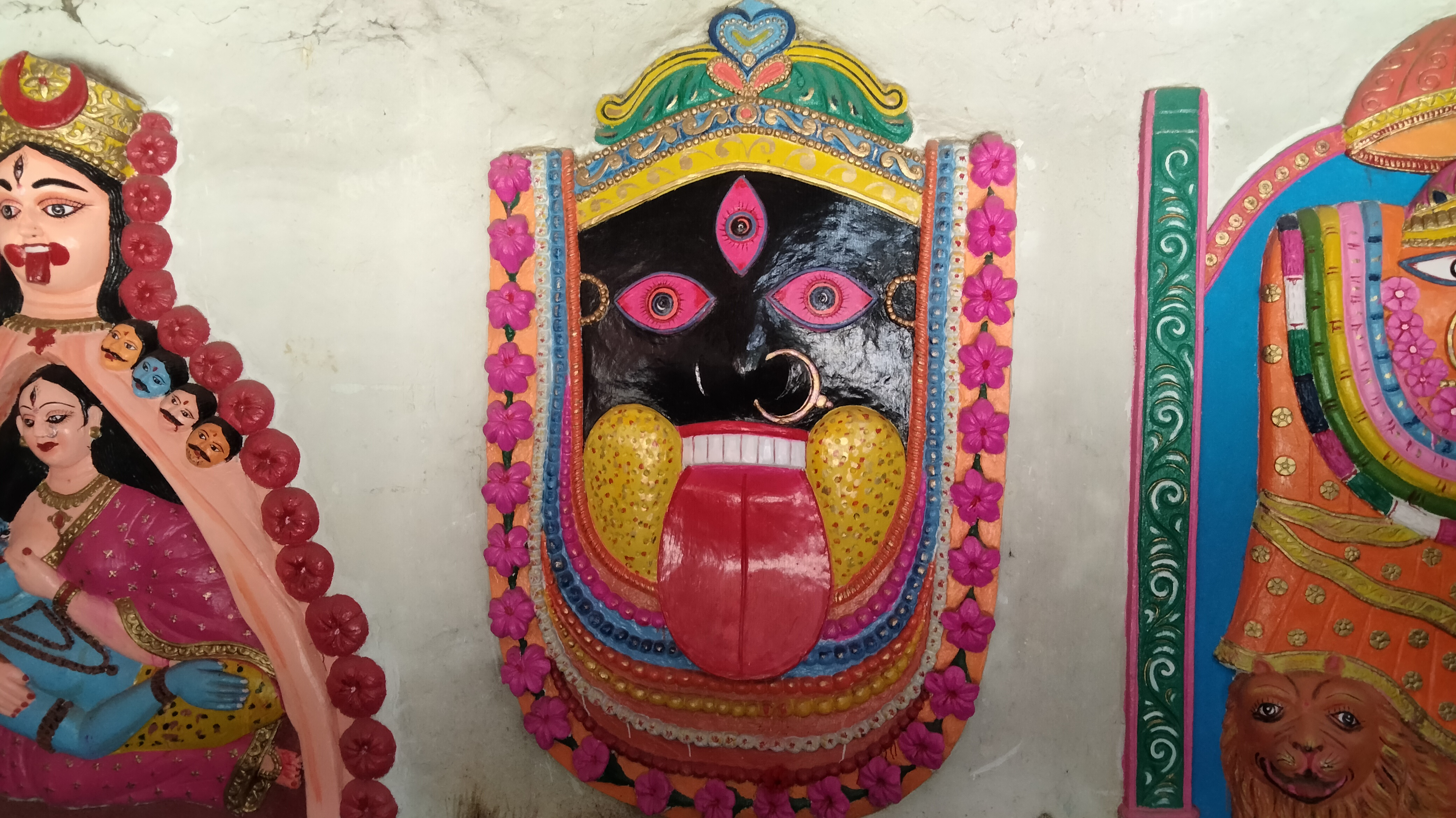
Images of the Hindu deities carved on the wall of the Kali Mandir at the Kalidas Dih. The middle image in the photo is of the Goddess Kali.

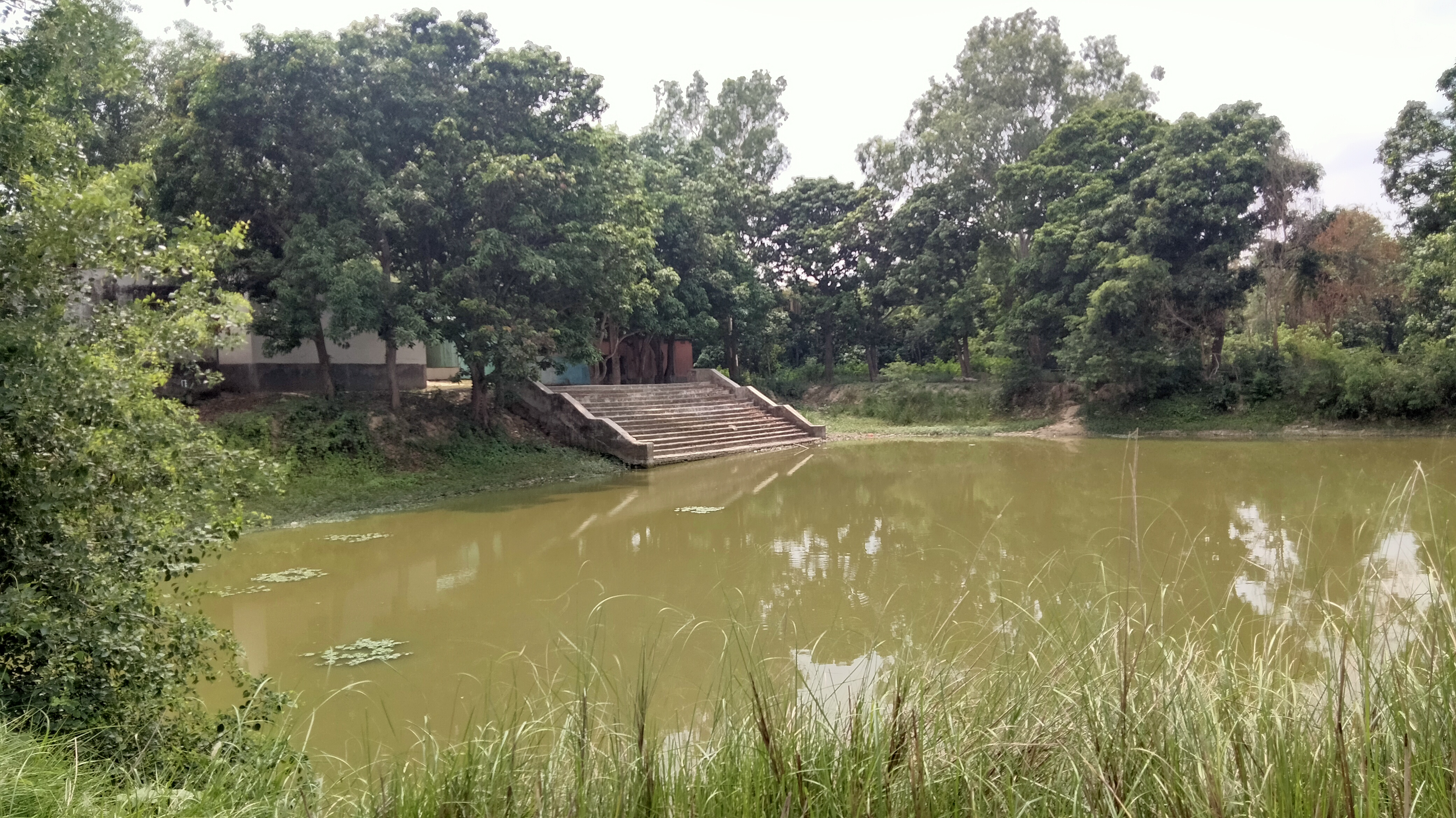
Kalidas Dih Pokhair

== Land description ==
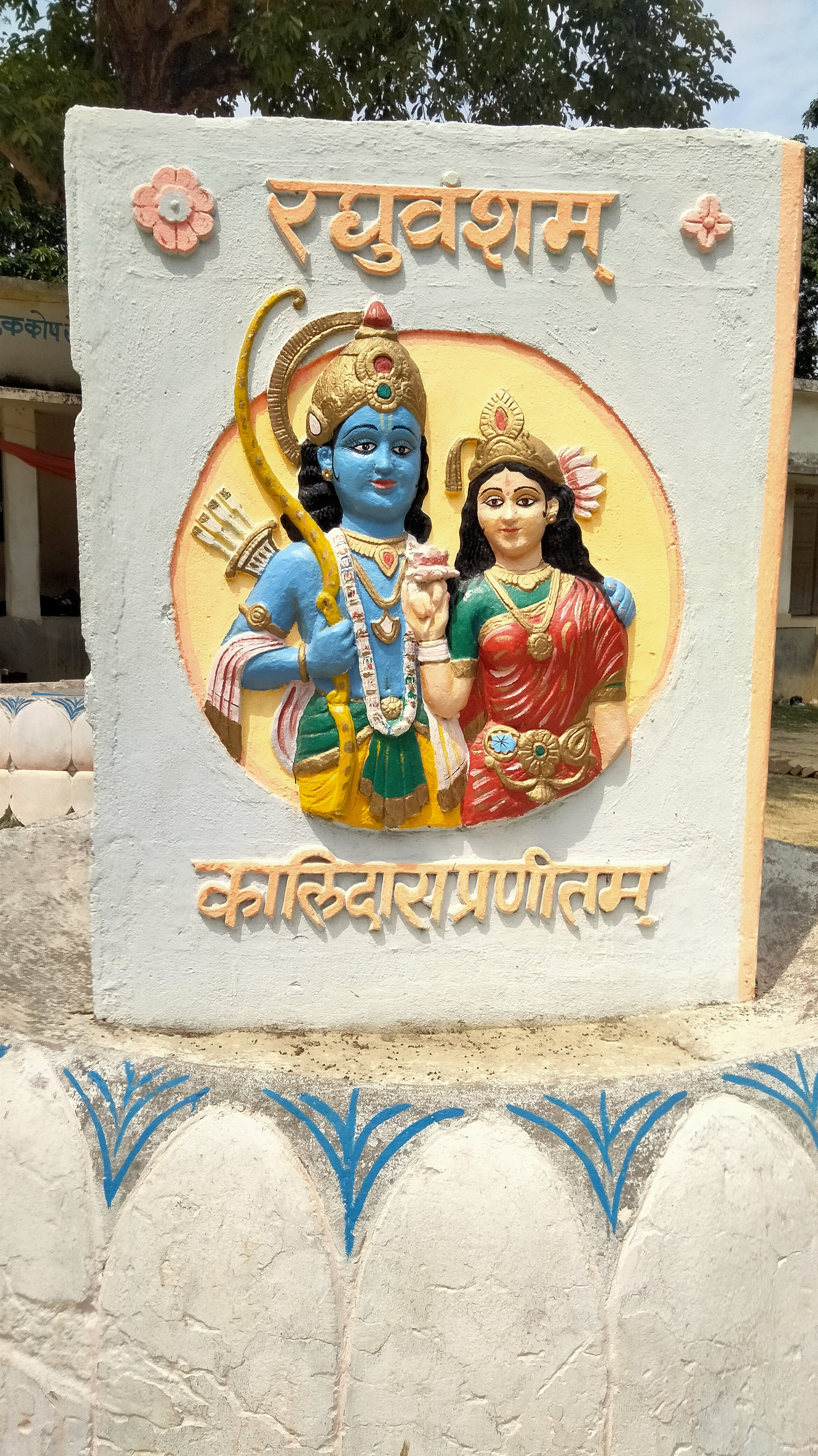
Statue of the Sanskrit poetic book Raghuvansham composed by Kalidasa at the campus of the Kalidas Dih.

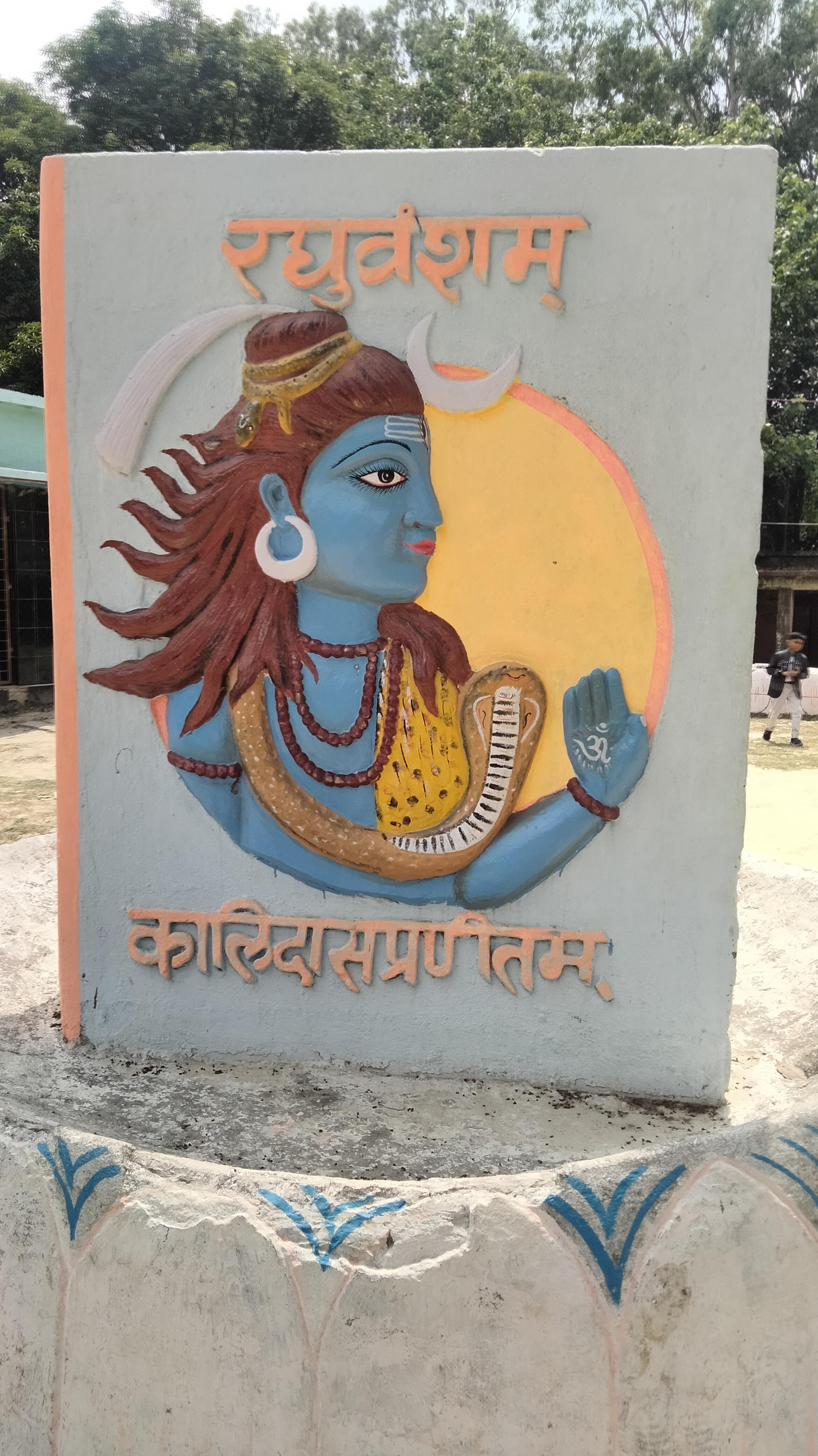

According to the Bihar government's Khatian and map, the total area of land available for the Kalidas Dih and its school is 2 bigha 12 kattha. In the land survey done by the governments in Bihar since the year 1896 and the subsequent years, the land is mentioned in the name of Kalidas Dih.

The soil of the Kalidas Dih holds an important position among the Maithil community in the region. There is a belief among them that those who use the soil of Kalidas Dih during Mundan and Upnayana Sanskar of their children, then the children become as brilliant as Kalidas. The soil of the dih is also used by the children of them instead of pencil while starting to write for the first time on slates.
