= Sitamarhi-Bhitthamore Road =

Border Road in Bihar

National Highway 227

- Schematic map of National Highways in India

Route information
- Tourist routes: Sitamarhi (India) ~ Janakpur (Nepal)

Location
- Country: India
- State: Bihar

Highway system
- Roads in India; Expressways; National; State; Asian; State Highways in Bihar

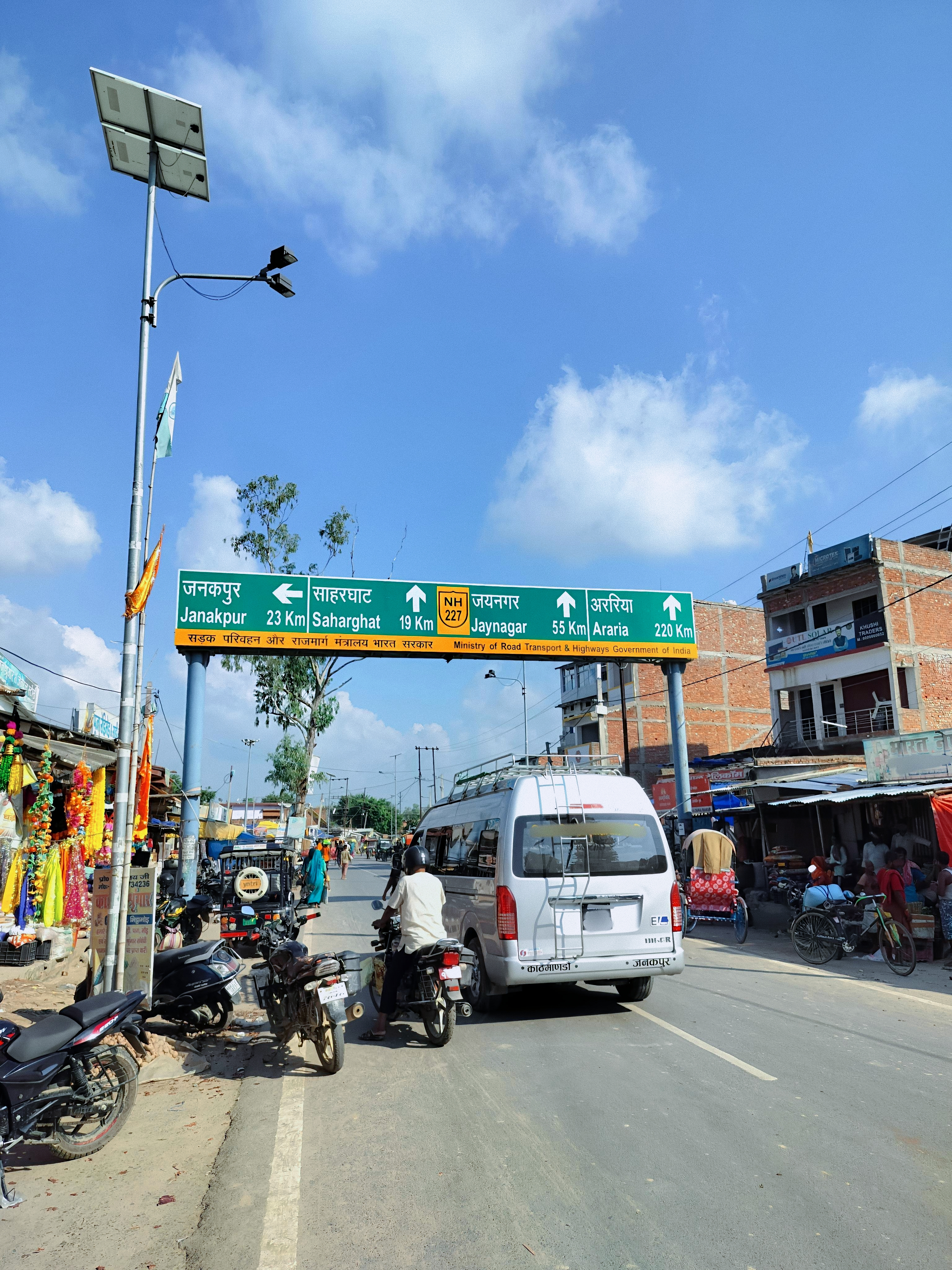
NH-227 signage board at Bhitthamore near the Indo–Nepal border

Sitamarhi-Bhitthamore Road is a section of the National Highway 227 (India). It is also a part of the Ram-Janki Path (Ramayan circuit). This road is important for religious reasons as it connects via Bhitthamore(India) to Janakpur which houses a 200-years-old Janki Temple with Sitamarhi—considered to be the birthplace of Goddess Sita. It is the lifeline road for the local towns and villages residing near the Indo-Nepal border. This road keeps on making headlines of news due to the floods & international border sharing with Nepal.

== Transportation ==
Buses and other forms of public transport operate on this route, making it easier for residents and travelers to commute between Sitamarhi and Bhitthamore.
