= Thumhani River =

River in Bihar, India

Thumhani River Thumane
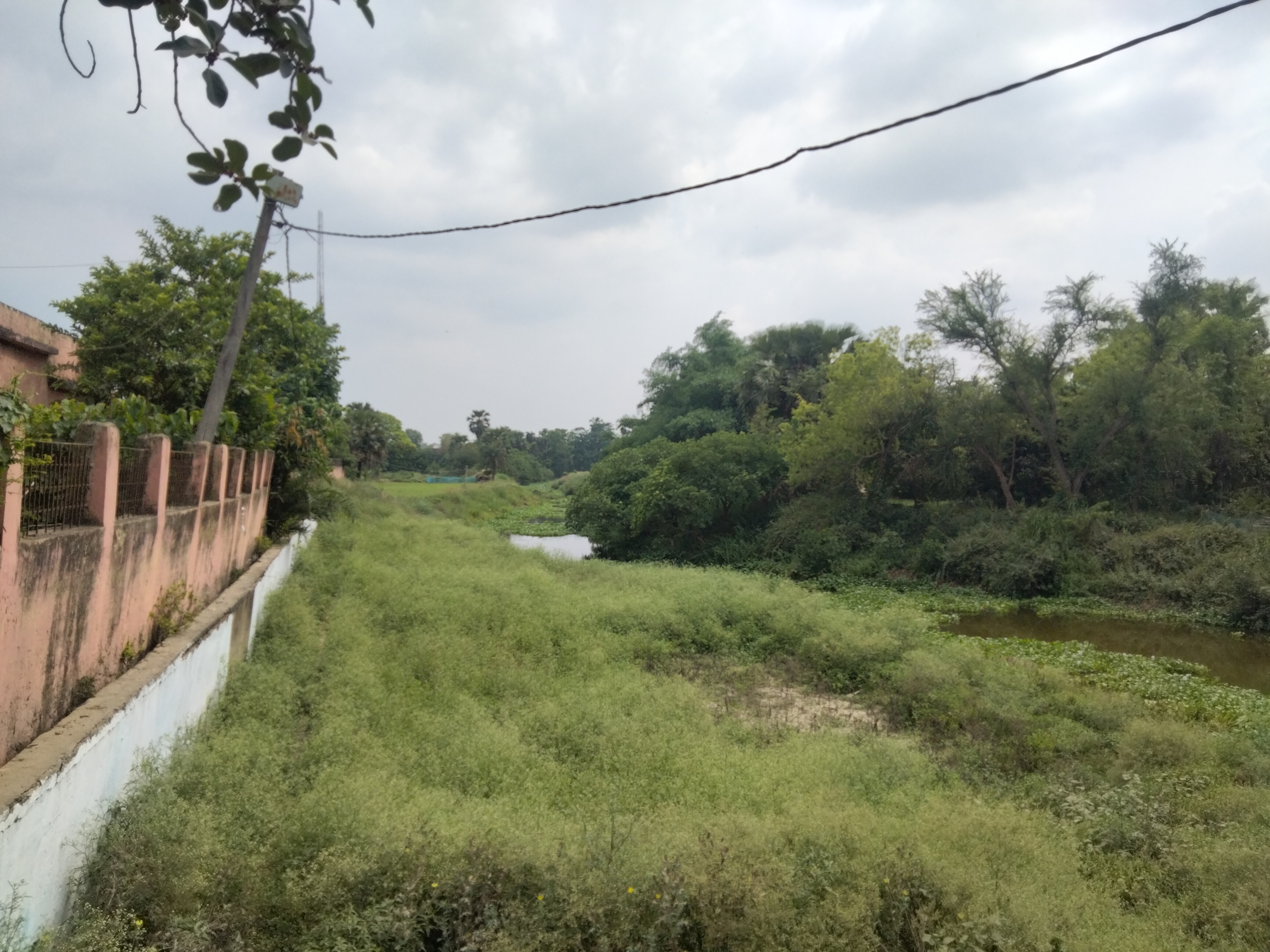
- View of Thumhani River from Kalidas Vidyapati Science College at Uchchaith village

Location
- Country: India
- State: Bihar
- Region: Mithila region
- District: Madhubani district

Physical characteristics
- Source: Kamla River
  - coordinates: 26.4188003°N 85.8528918°E
- Mouth: Dhouns River
  - coordinates: 26.5102907°N 85.8992327°E

Basin features
- River system: Adhwara
- Landmarks: Uchhaith

Thumhani River or Thumane is a river that flows on the plains of the western part in the Madhubani district of the Mithila region in Bihar state of India. It is the part of the Adhwara group of rivers in the Indian Subcontinent.

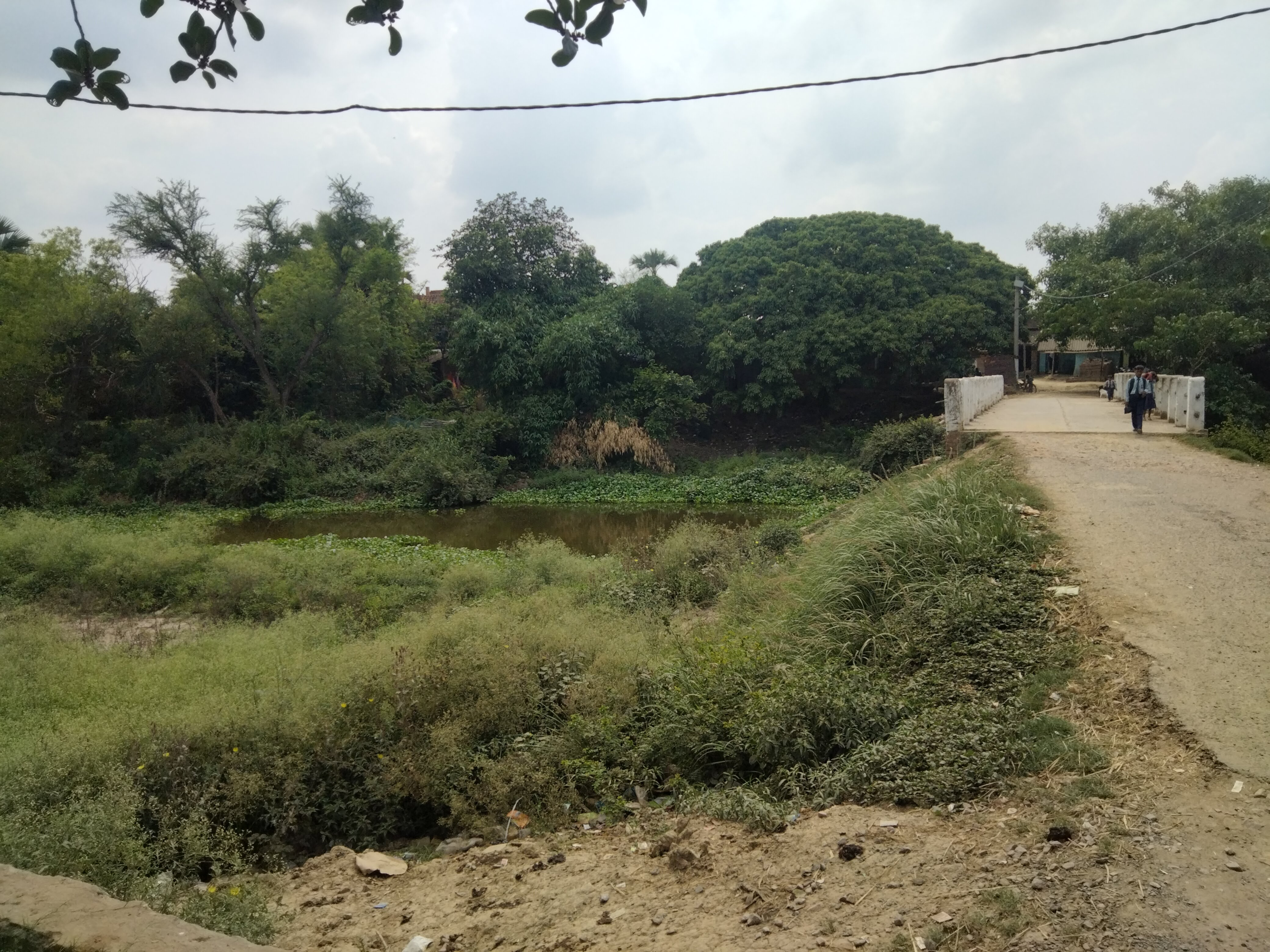
View of the Kalidas Pul (Kalidas Bridge) over the river at Uchchaith.

== Description ==
Thumhani River is the part of Adhwara group of rivers flowing on the plains of land in the territory of India. It flows on the plains of the Mithila region between the rivers Kamala and Dhouns. It is the connecting river that gives link to the two rivers Kamala and Dhouns. One end of the river is at the Sauli Ghat also known as Sauli Chowk that connects it with the Kamala river.

== Historical and religious significance ==
Thumhani River is associated with the history and legends of the Sanskrit poet and scholar Kalidasa. On the eastern bank of the river, there is a historical mud mound known as Kalidas Dih in the village of Uchchaith. The Kalidas Dih is believed to be residence place of the Sanskrit scholar Kalidasa.

On the western bank of the Thumhani River, there is a famous Hindu temple of Goddess Durga and Kali called as Uchchaith Bhagwati Mandir also locally known as Durga Sthan.
