= Bhitthamore Land Port =

Land port in Bihar

- भिट्ठामोड़ भूमि पत्तन
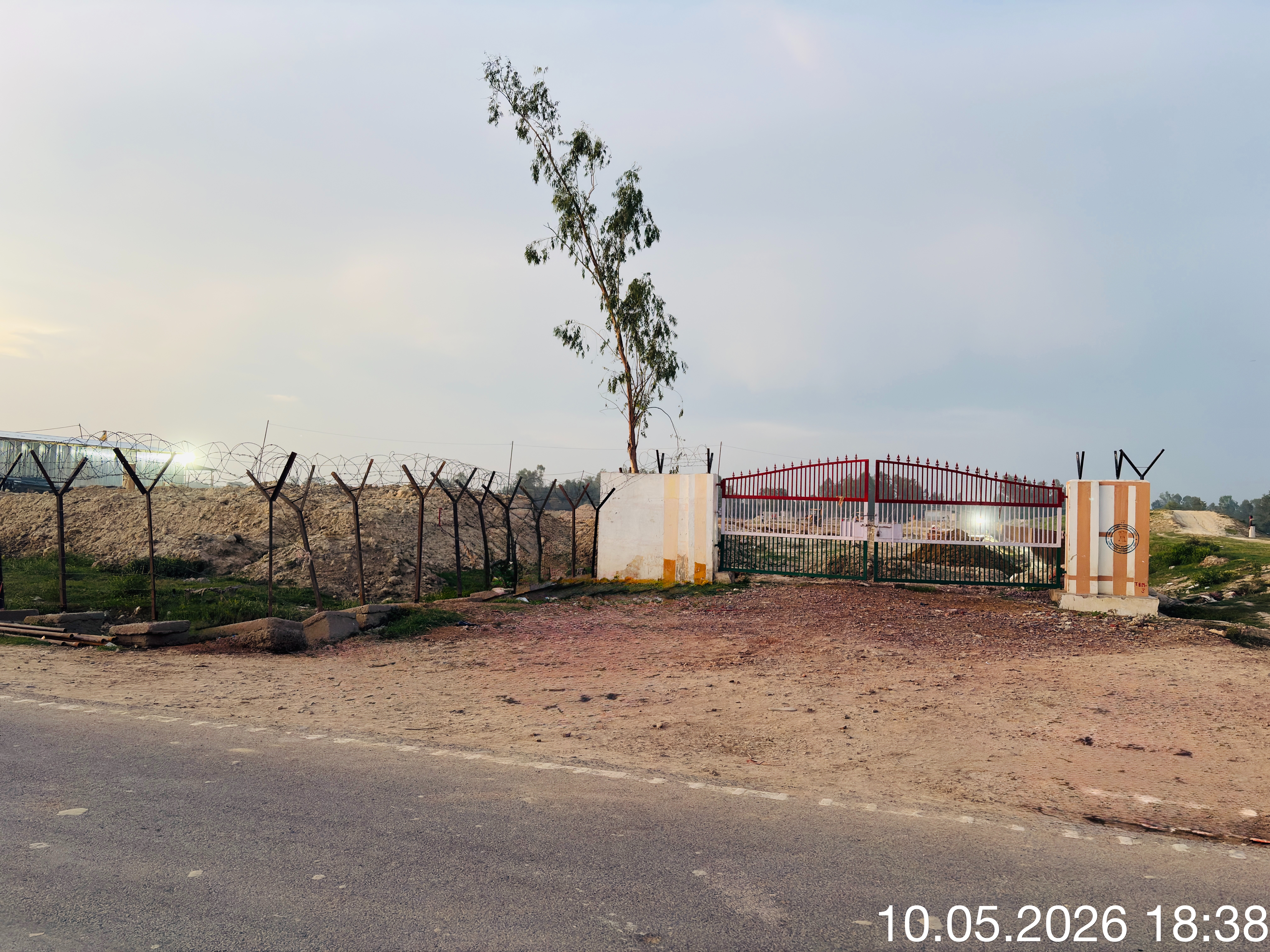
- Proposed Land Port at Bhitthamore, Sitamarhi district, Bihar

Agency overview
- Formed: Proposed
- Headquarters: Bhitthamore, Sitamarhi district, Bihar, India; 26.6294°N 85.7697°E
- Parent department: Ministry of Home Affairs
- Parent agency: Land Ports Authority of India
- Website: lpai.gov.in

Bhitthamore Land Port is the under-construction dry land port at the Indo–Nepal border line in the Bhitthamore village of the Bihar state in India. It is located near the Sursand town in the Sitamarhi district of the Mithila region in Bihar.It is an integrated check post at Bhitthamore to provide better facilities for cross-border cargo movements between the two nations India and Nepal. It is an important land port having immense potential in terms of cross-border passenger movement due to the reasons of Ramayana circuit and Buddhist circuit. It is under the jurisdiction of the Patna Customs (P) Commissionerate.

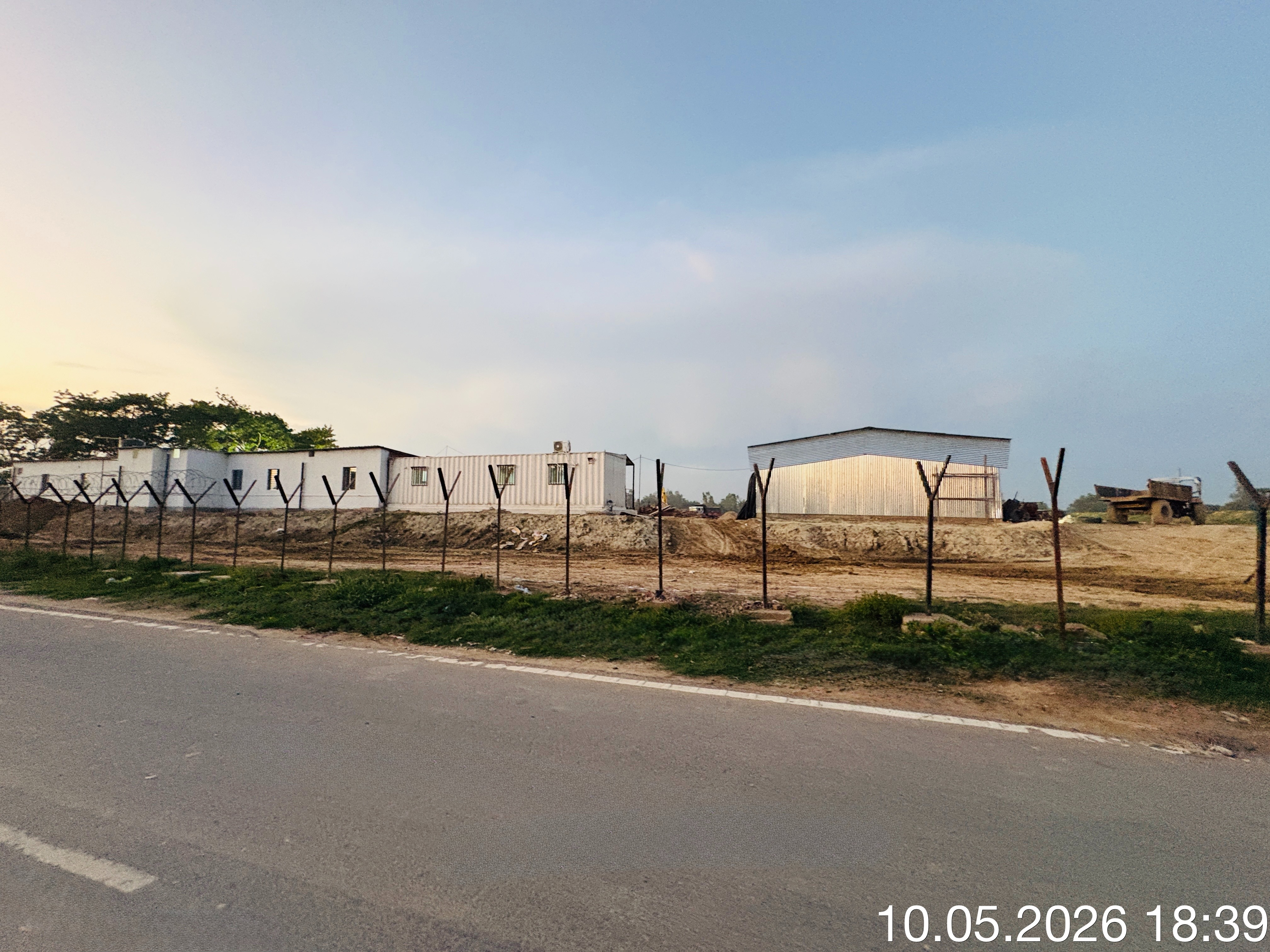
View of the premises of the underconstruction dry port.
