= Shrikhandi Bhittha =

Village in Bihar, India

Bhitthamore
- Village
- Shrikhandi Bhittha
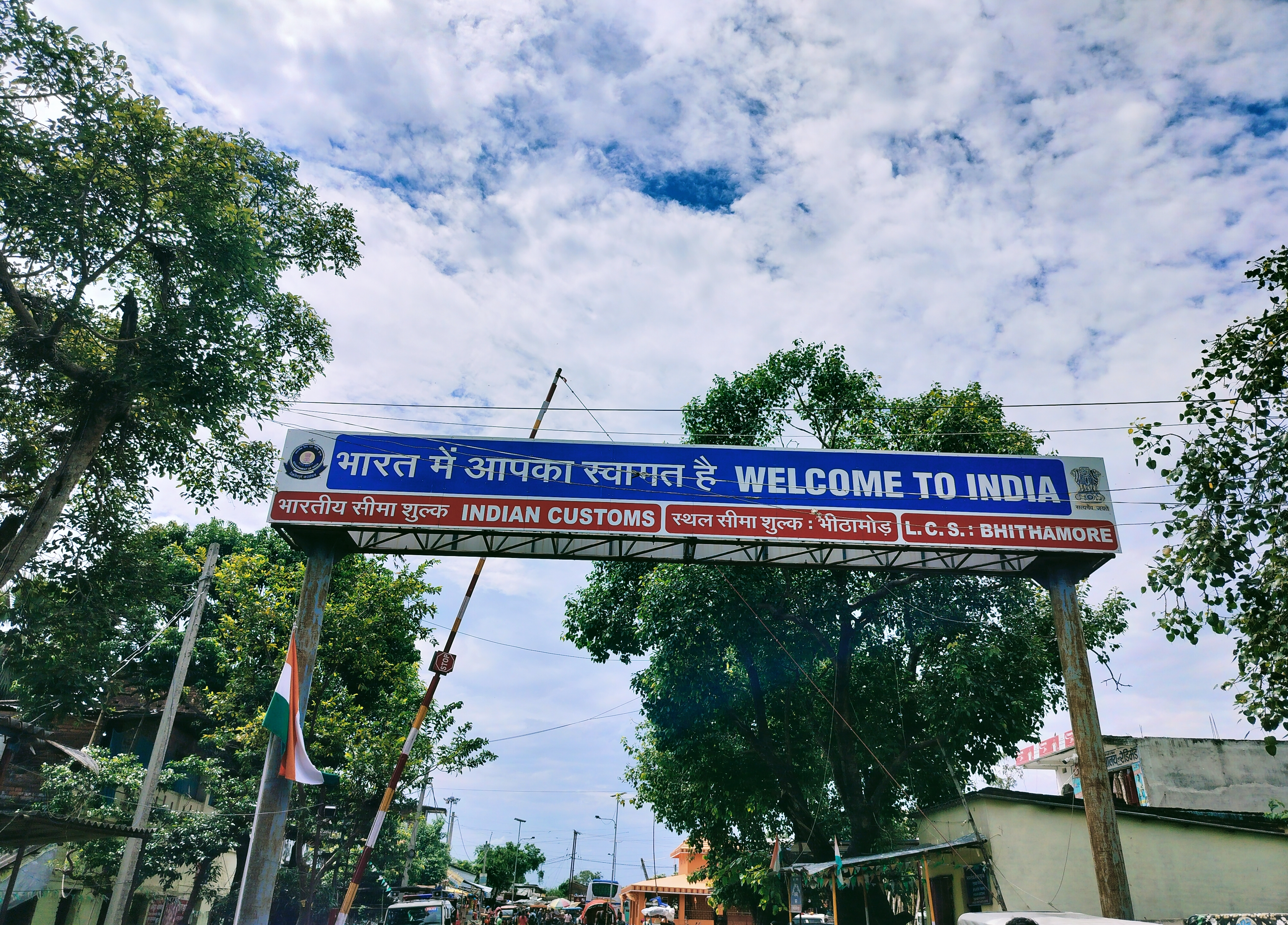
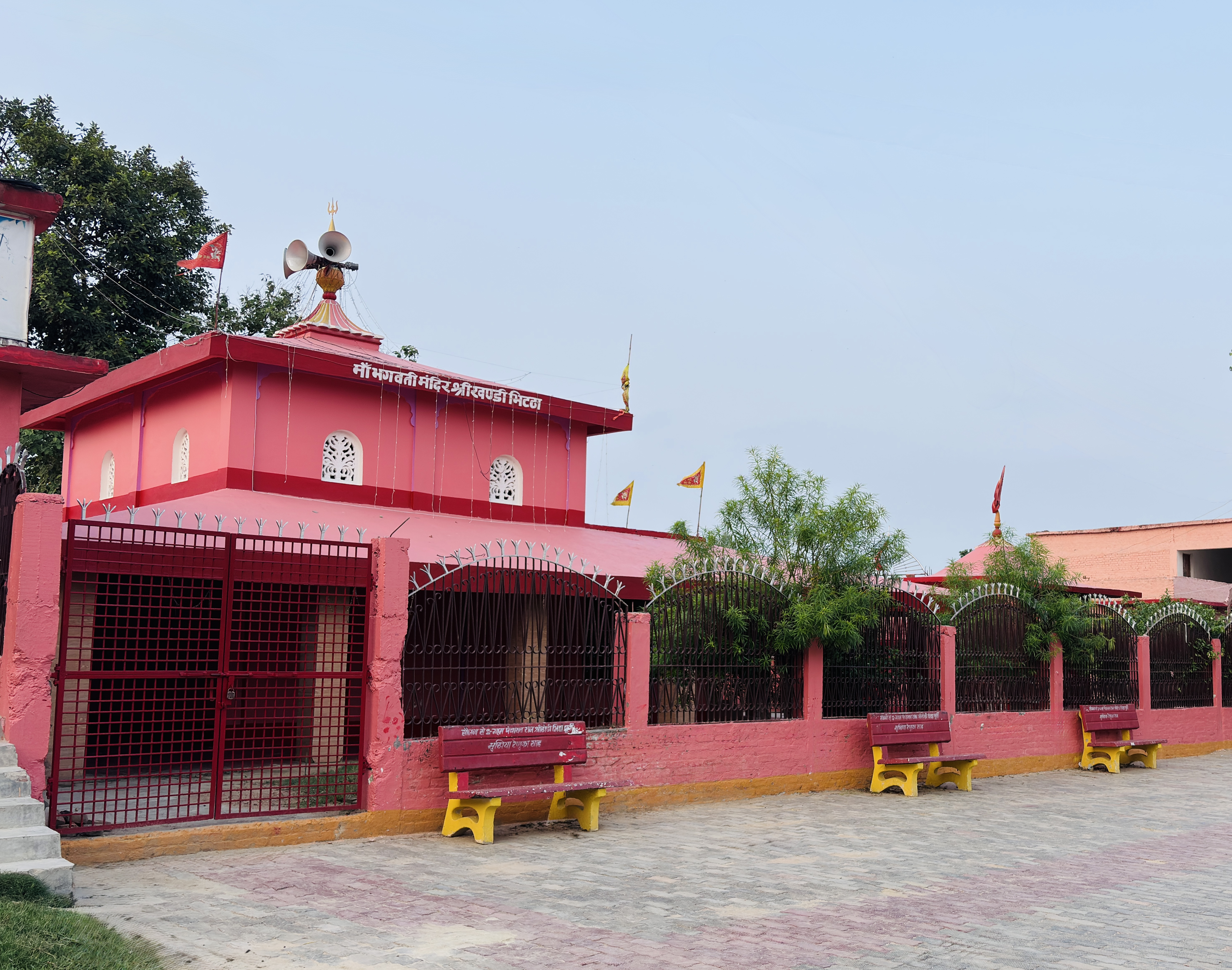
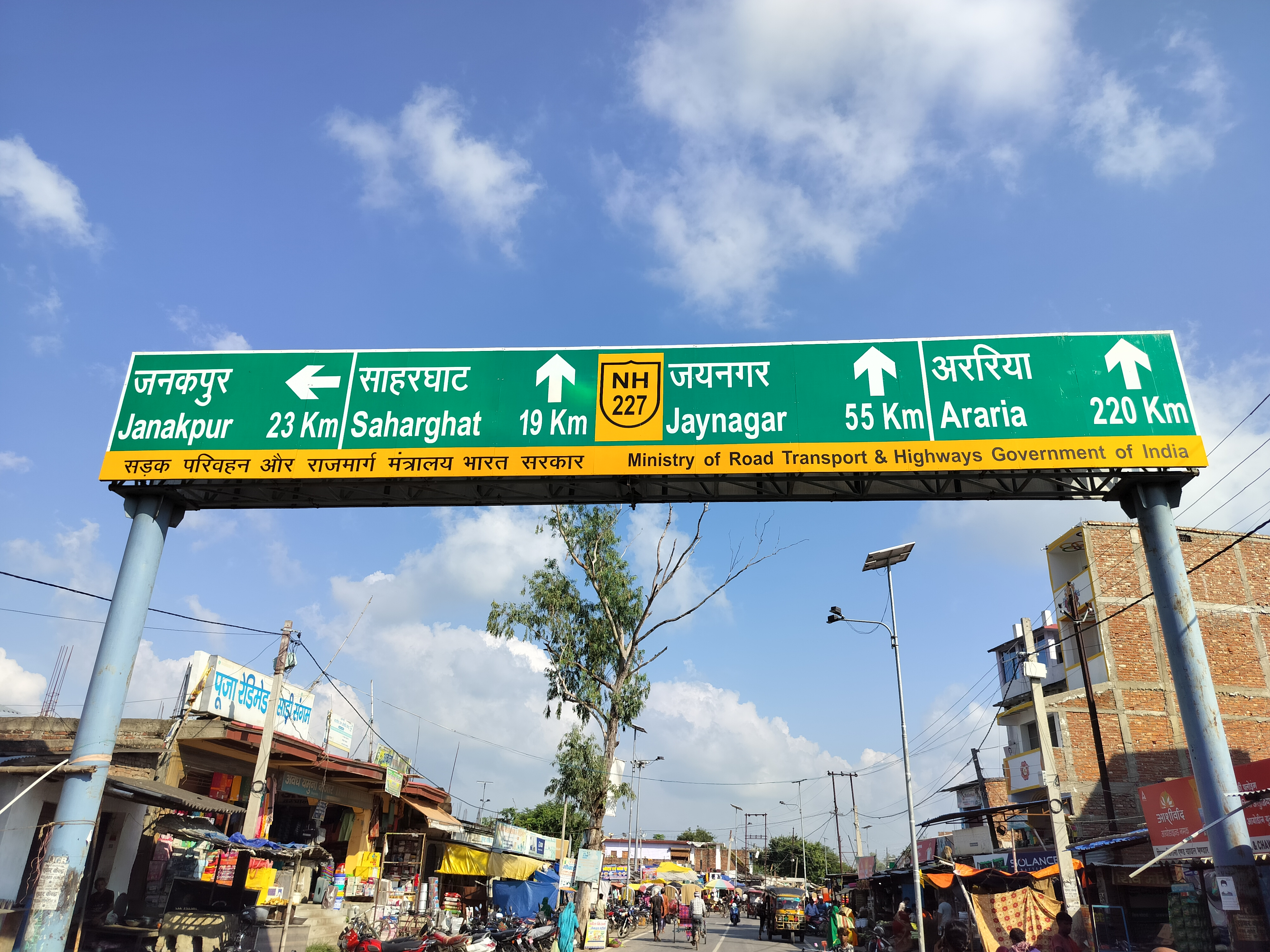
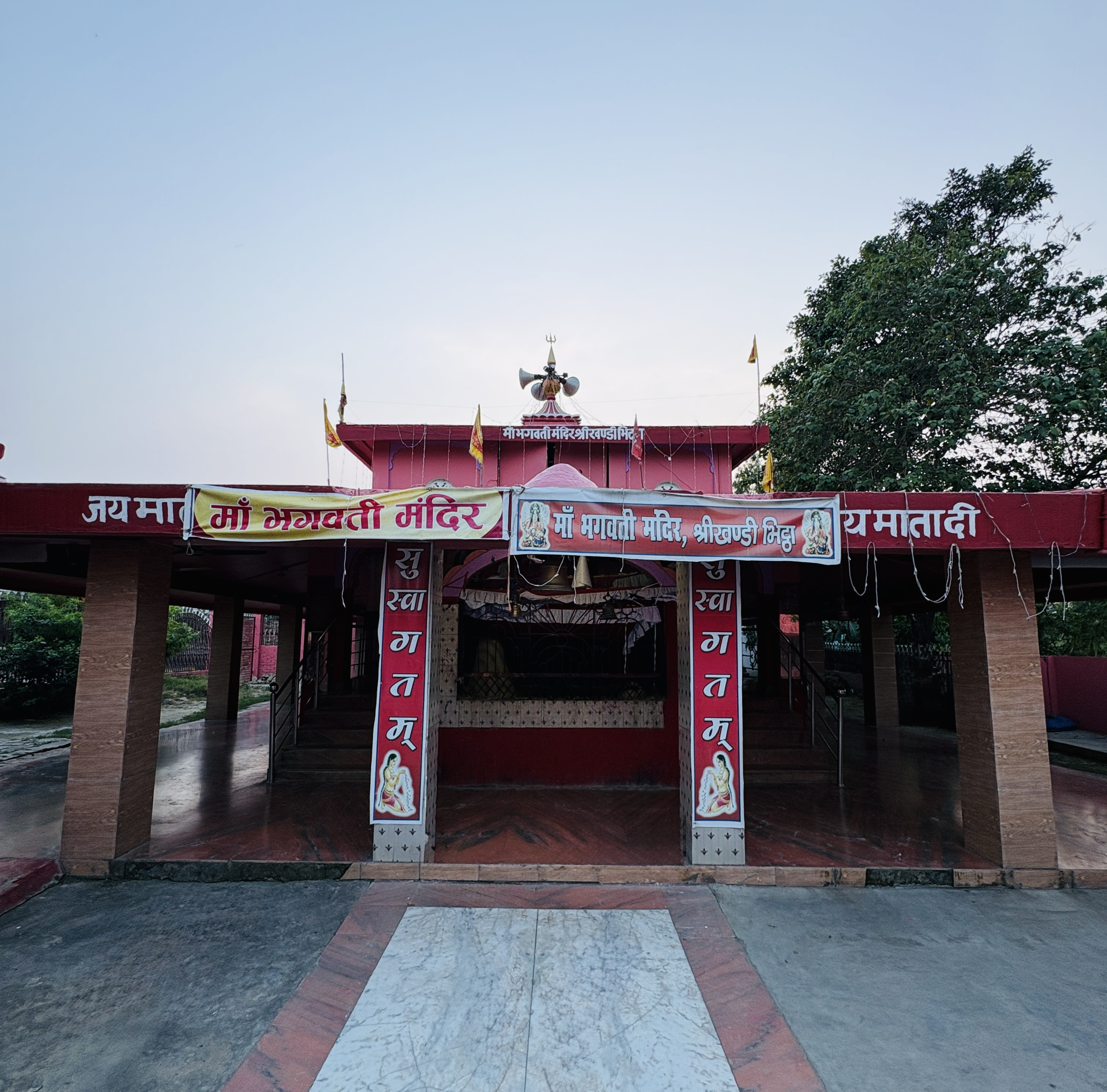
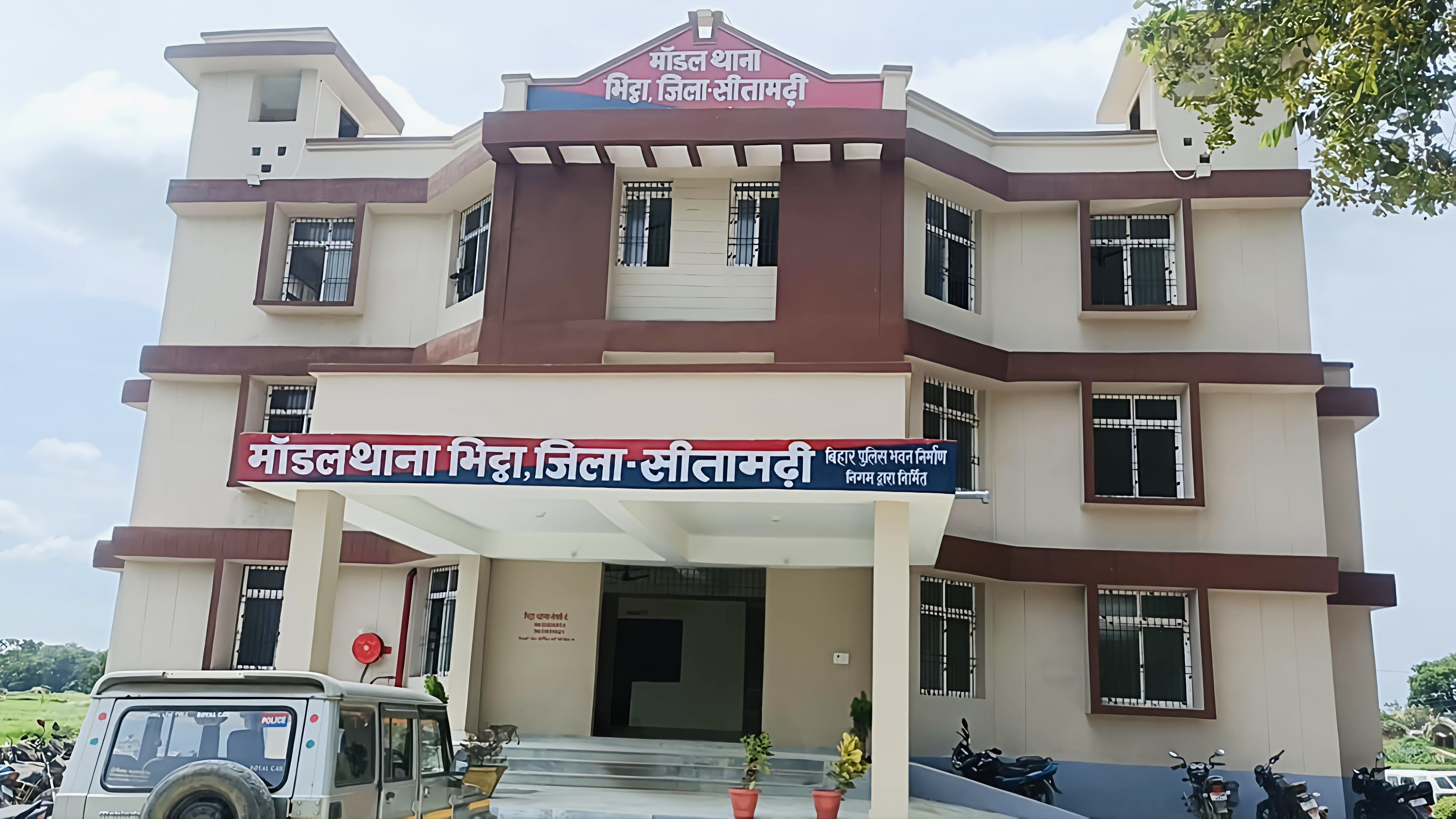
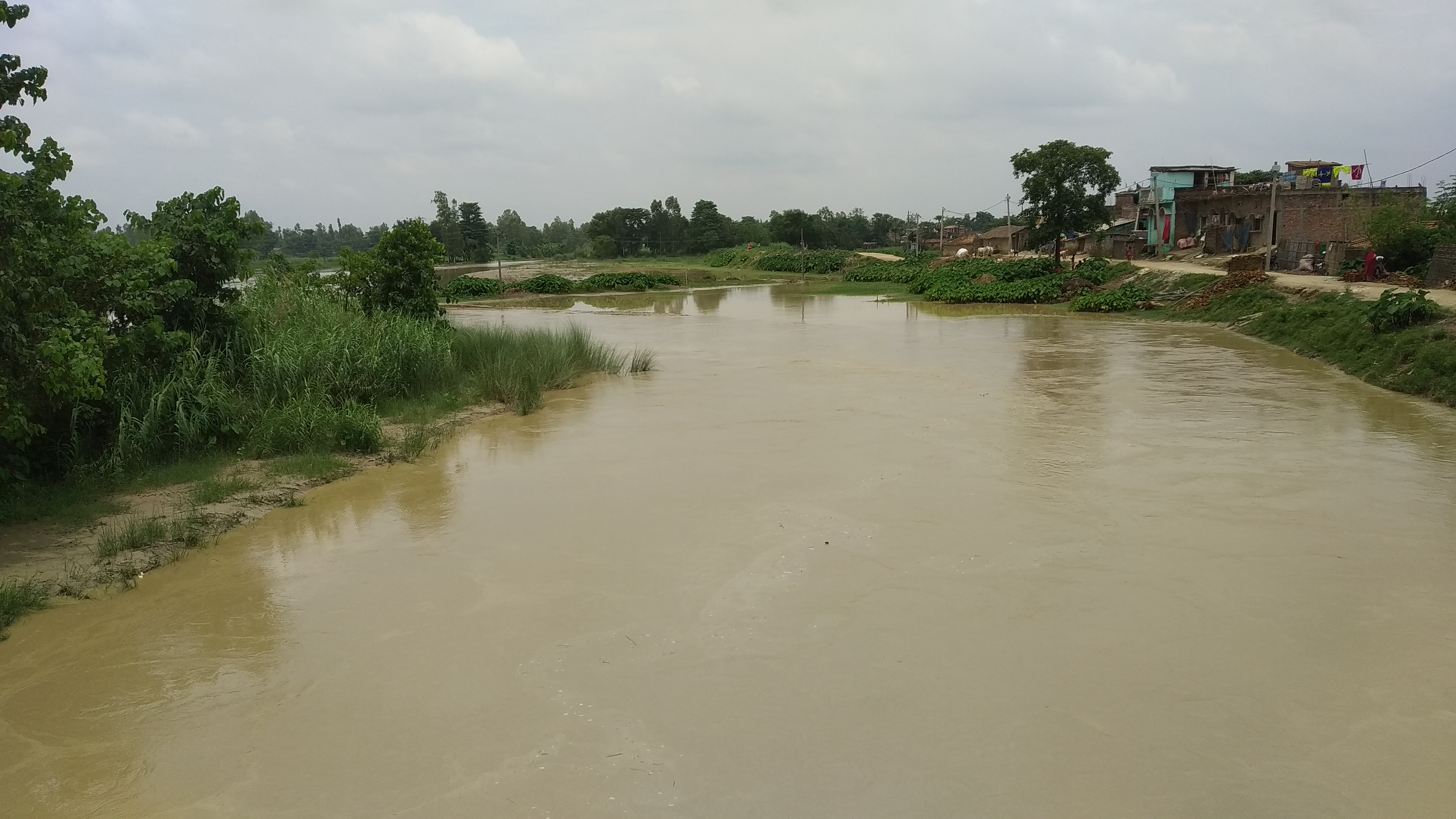
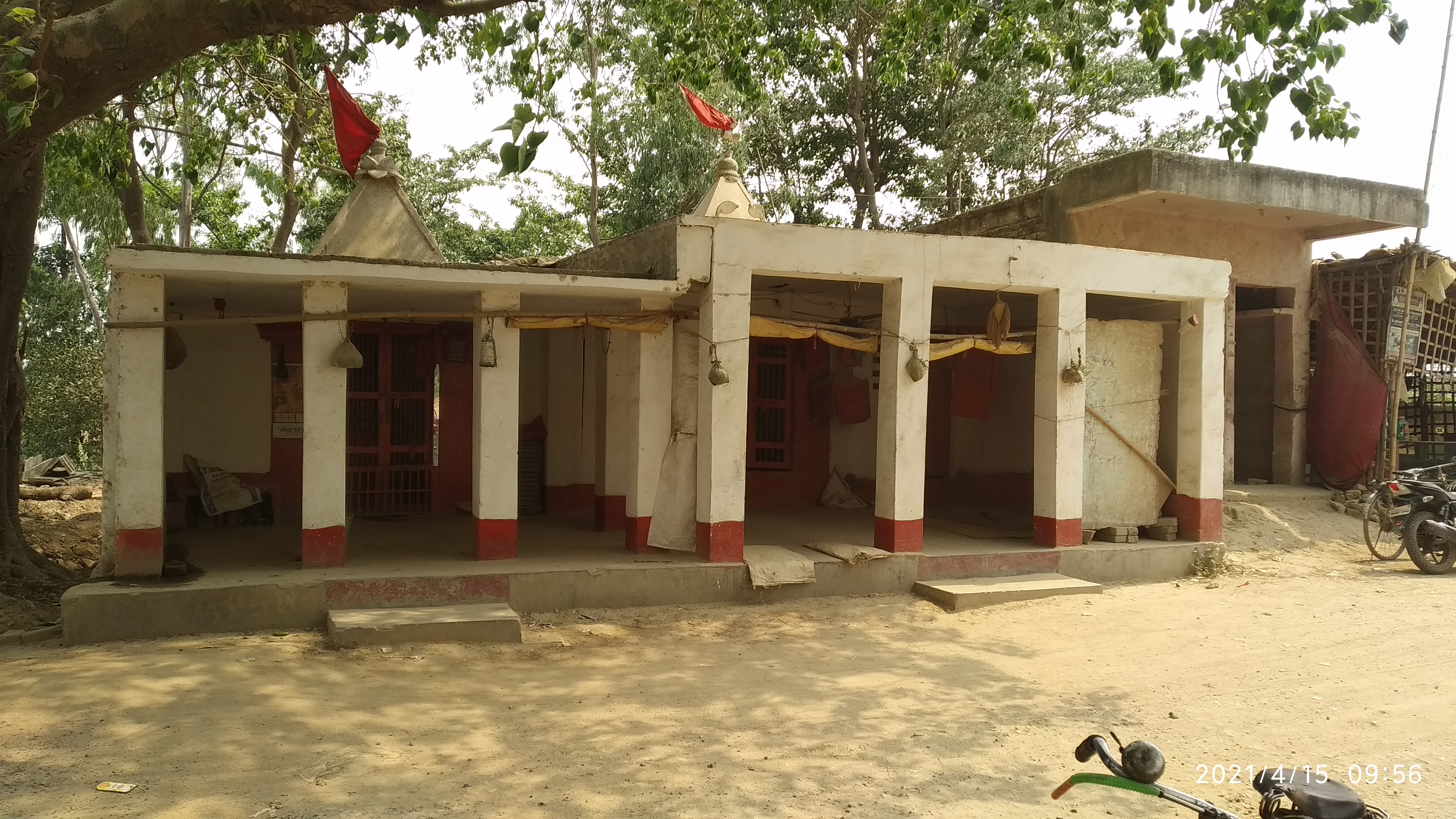
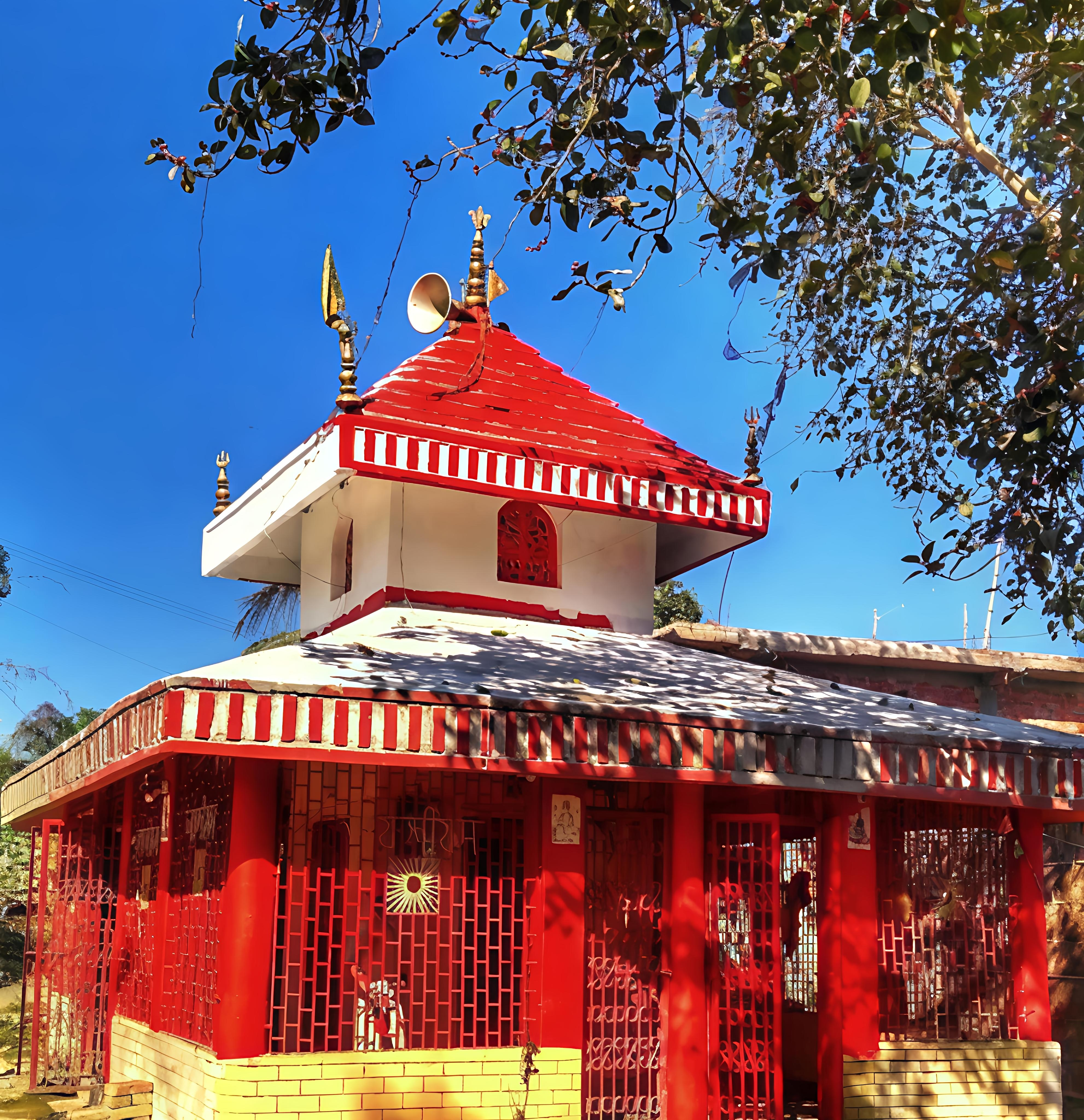
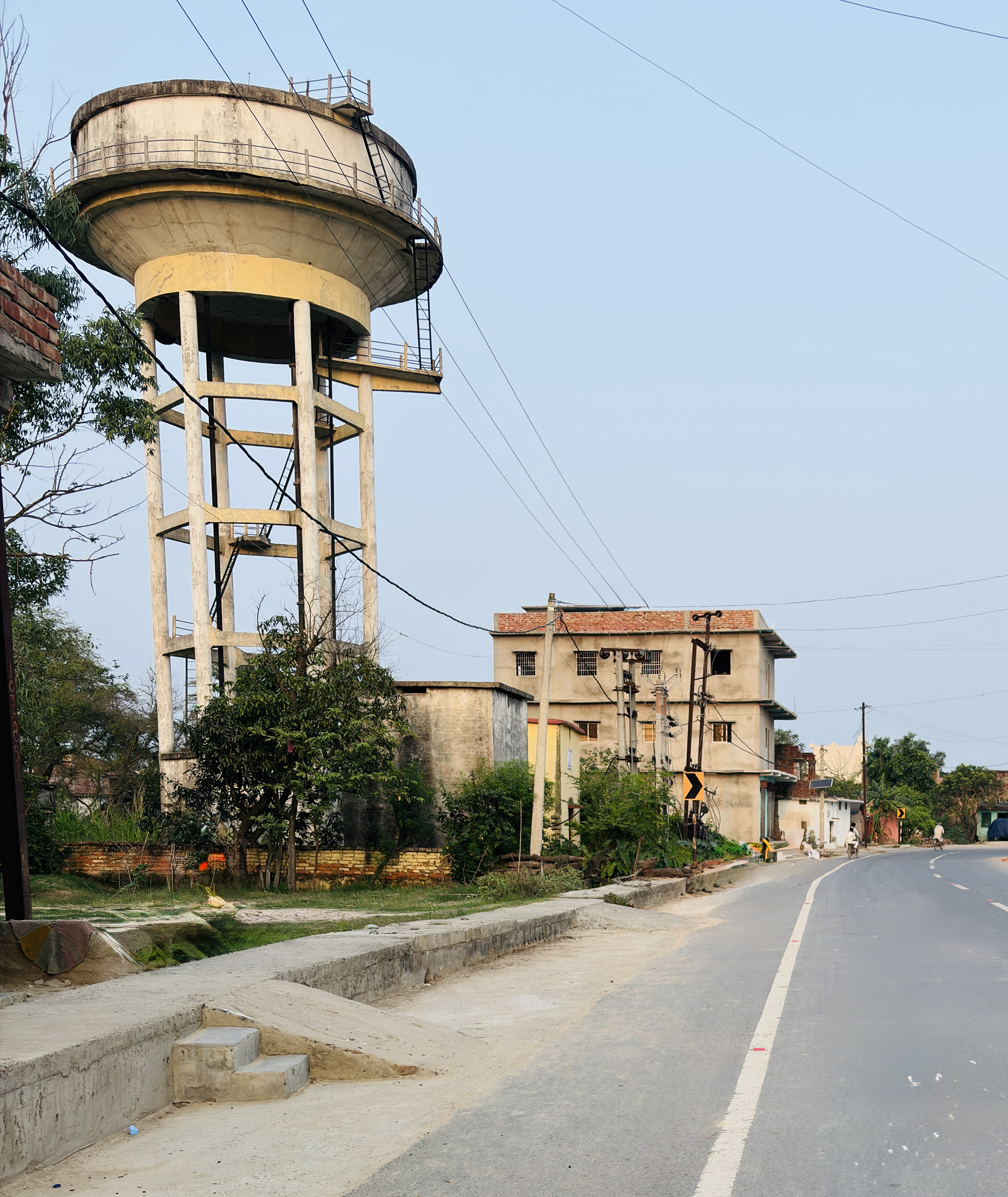
- Indian Customs Office, Bhitthamore Maa Bhagwati Temple premises View of Bhitthamore Maa Bhagwati Temple internal front view Model Police Station, Bhittha Raato River Hanuman Mandir near Raato Bridge Mahavir Sthan Main overhead water tank near NH-227

- Location in Bihar, India
- Coordinates: 26°37′46″N 85°46′11″E
- Country: India
- State: Bihar
- District: Sitamarhi
- Block: Sursand
- Gram Panchayat: Shrikhandi Bhittha Purvi
- Police Station: Bhittha Thana

Government
  - Body: Gram panchayat
- Elevation: 64 m (210 ft)

Population (2011)
  - Total: 23,795
- Demonym: Maithil

Language
  - Official: Hindi
  - Local: Maithili
- Time zone: UTC+5:30
- PIN: 843331
- Telephone Code: 06228
- Vehicle registration: BR-30

Bhitthamore or Shrikhandi Bhittha is a significant human settlement in the Sitamarhi district of the Indian state of Bihar. It is located near the India–Nepal border, along the Ratnawati (Raato) River, serving as a major transit and trade hub. The settlement is a key junction on National Highway 227 connecting it to its district headquarters Sitamarhi (30 km),Janakpur, Nepal (23 km) and Jaynagar (55 km). The area hosts the Bhitthamore Land Port and is monitored by the Sashastra Seema Bal (SSB).

== Geography ==
The village has a border checkpoint at the crossing to Malibara, Jaleshwar, Nepal. Bhitthamore is about 30 kilometres east of its district headquarters, Sitamarhi. National Highway 227 passes through Bhitthamore. It is a gateway to Janakpur, Nepal and parts of Sitamarhi and Madhubani along the border side.

== Culture ==
=== Festivals ===
The major festival of this area is Chhath Puja in which people offer prayers to Lord Sun. Holi, Diwali, Dussehra, Makar Sankranti, and Eid al-Fitr are also celebrated.

=== Religious tourism ===
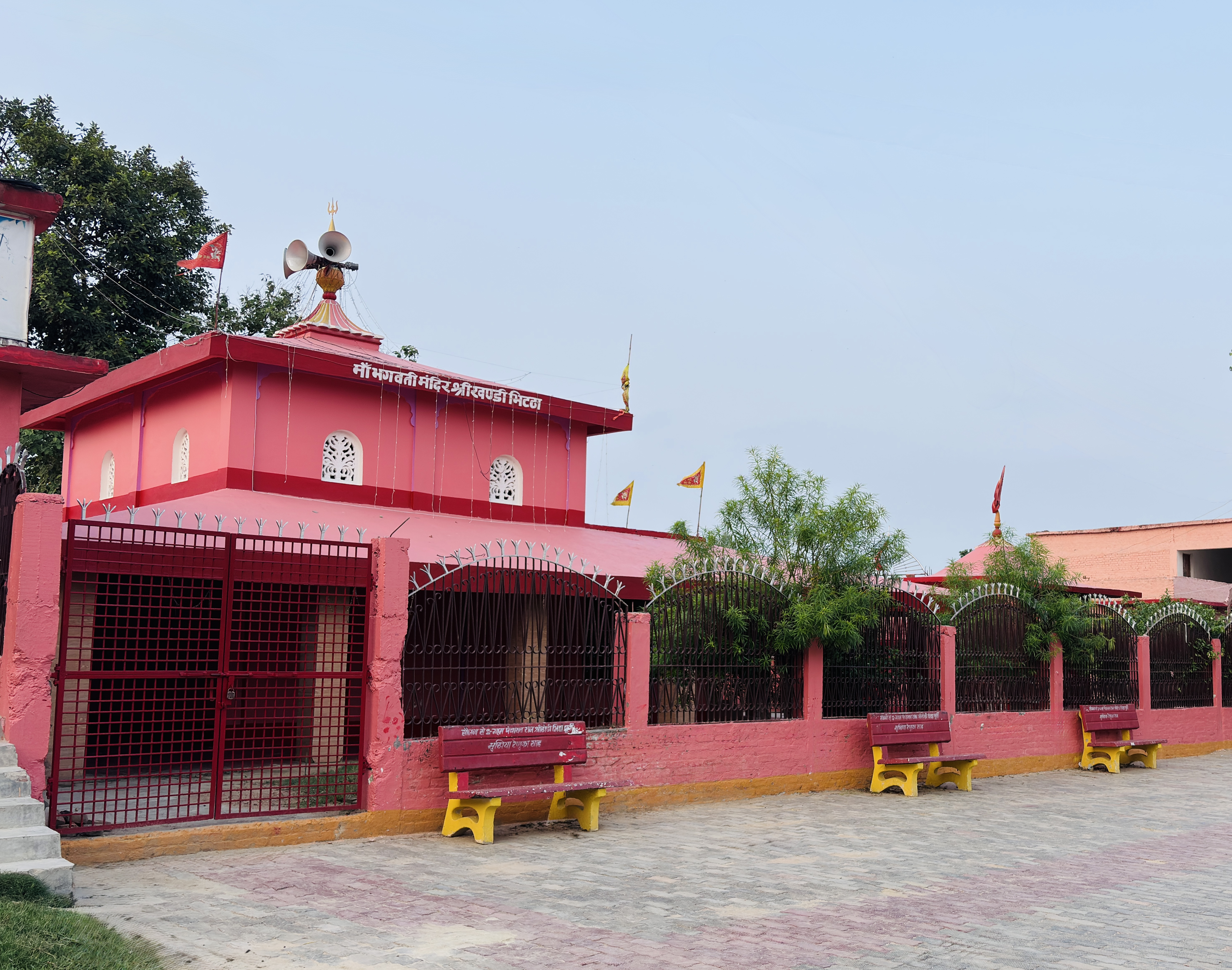
Maa Bhagwati sthal (Hindi: मां भगवती स्थल)

Krishneshwar Nath Mahadev Mandir (कृष्णेस्वर नाथ महादेव मंदिर)

Mahavir sthan (Hindi: महावीर स्थान)

Shalhesh sthan (Hindi: शलहेस स्थान)

Raato Bridge (Hindi: रातो पुल)

== Education ==
This is the educational hub of the area. There are many private as well as government-run schools.

- Government schools
  - Rajkiya Madhya Vidyalaya Shrikhandi Bhittha
  - Upgraded High School Bhittha Bazaar
  - Middle School "Kanya"
  - High School Shrikhandi Bhittha, Bhitthamore
- Private schools
  - Delhi Public School
  - Indian Public School
  - Muskan Public School
  - Saraswati Shishu Mandir
  - Top Infant Public School

== Economy ==
=== Agriculture ===
It is a developing urban area with a primarily agricultural economy. It has experienced steady economic growth mainly due to the international border, modernization, changing lifestyles and technical advancement in various fields.

=== Trade ===
Due to its growing economy, growing demand, improved connectivity and infrastructure, it has become a centre for trade and commerce.

The village contains a market place named Bhitthamore.

=== Health ===
Although Shrikhandi Bhittha Primary Health Center (Hindi: प्राथमिक स्वास्थ्य केन्द्र, श्रीखंडी भिट्ठा) is available, many people travel to Sitamarhi for emergency situations.

== Transport ==
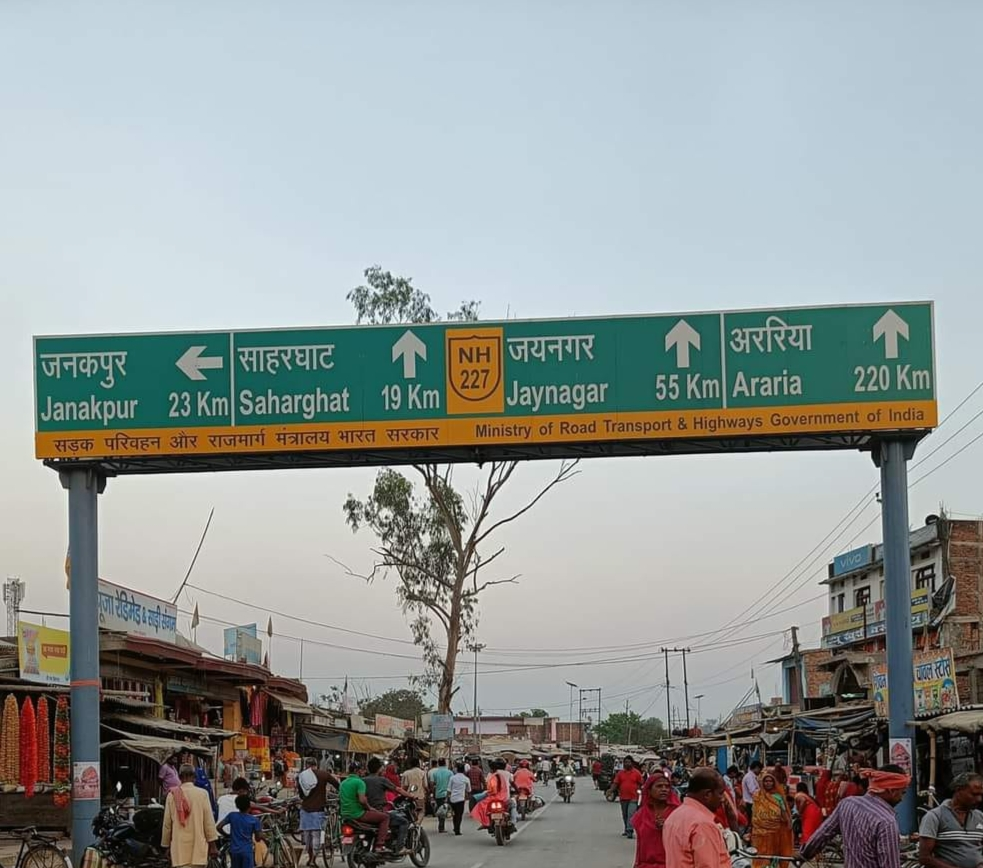
NH227 signage board at Bhitthamore.

=== Airport ===
The nearest airport is Janakpur Airport, Nepal located about 22 km to the north of Bhitthamore. While the nearest airport in India is Darbhanga Airport, about 76 km to the South-East of Bhitthamore.

=== Railway ===
Sitamarhi Junction railway station (code: SMI), 30 km to the west of Shrikhandi Bhittha, is the nearest major railway station and Janakpur Road railway station (Code:JNR), 30 km to the south of Bhitthamore connecting to the rest of India via Indian Rail network.

=== Roads and highways ===
National Highway 227 (Old NH-104) passes through Bhitthamore. It is a gateway to Janakpur, Nepal and parts of Sitamarhi and Madhubani along the border side. This road keeps on making headlines of news due to the floods and international border sharing with Nepal. The Sitamarhi-Bhitthamore Road is important for religious reasons as it connects Janakpur, which houses a 200-year-old Janki Temple with Sitamarhi—considered to be the birthplace of Goddess Sita. Regular bus services are available to various locations in Bihar, with connections to other locations throughout the region.

=== Bhithamore India-Nepal Land Port ===
Land Port Bhithamore is located in the Sitamarhi district of Bihar along the international border between India and Nepal.

== Photo gallery ==
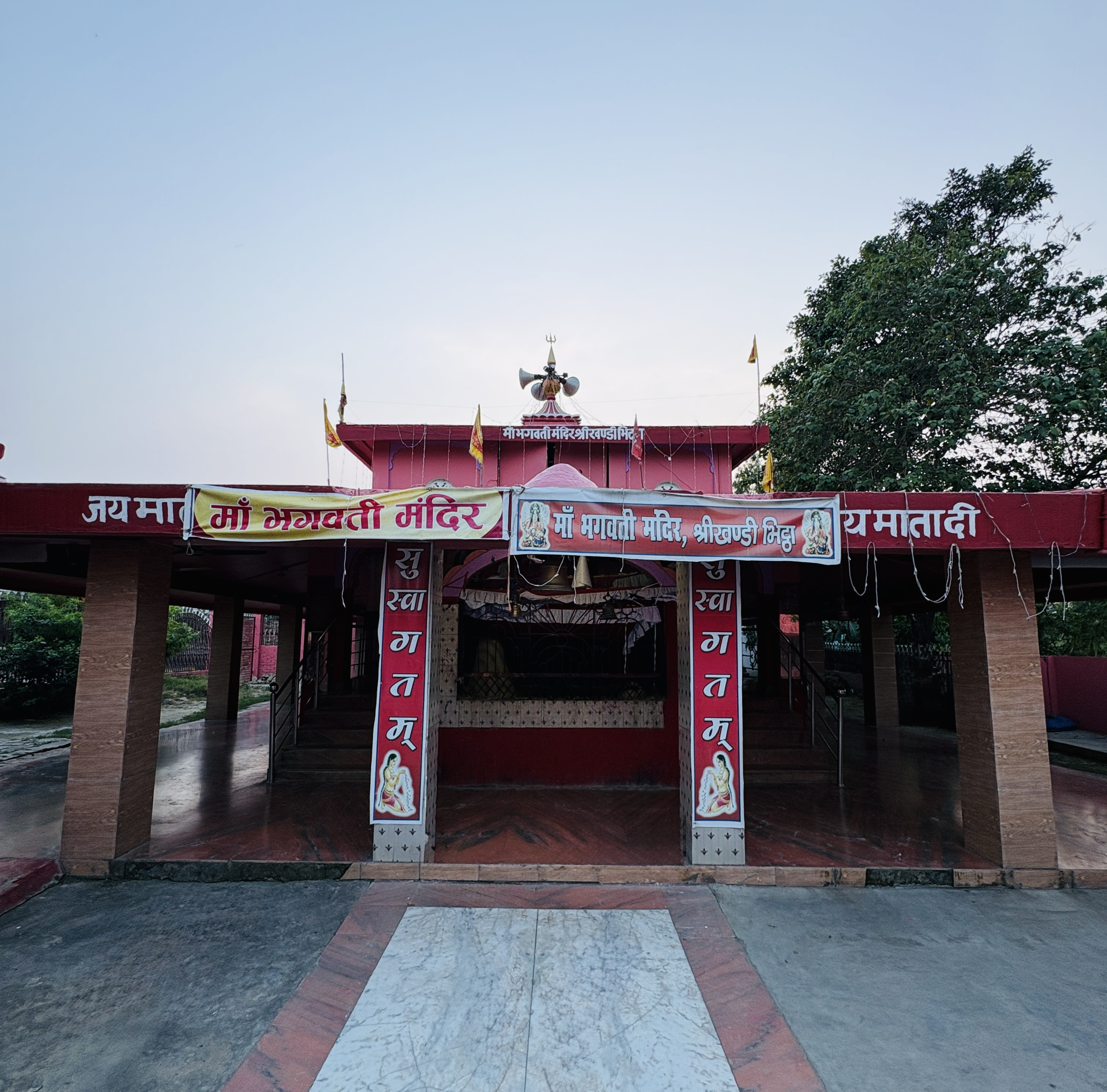
Maa Bhagwati temple internal front view.

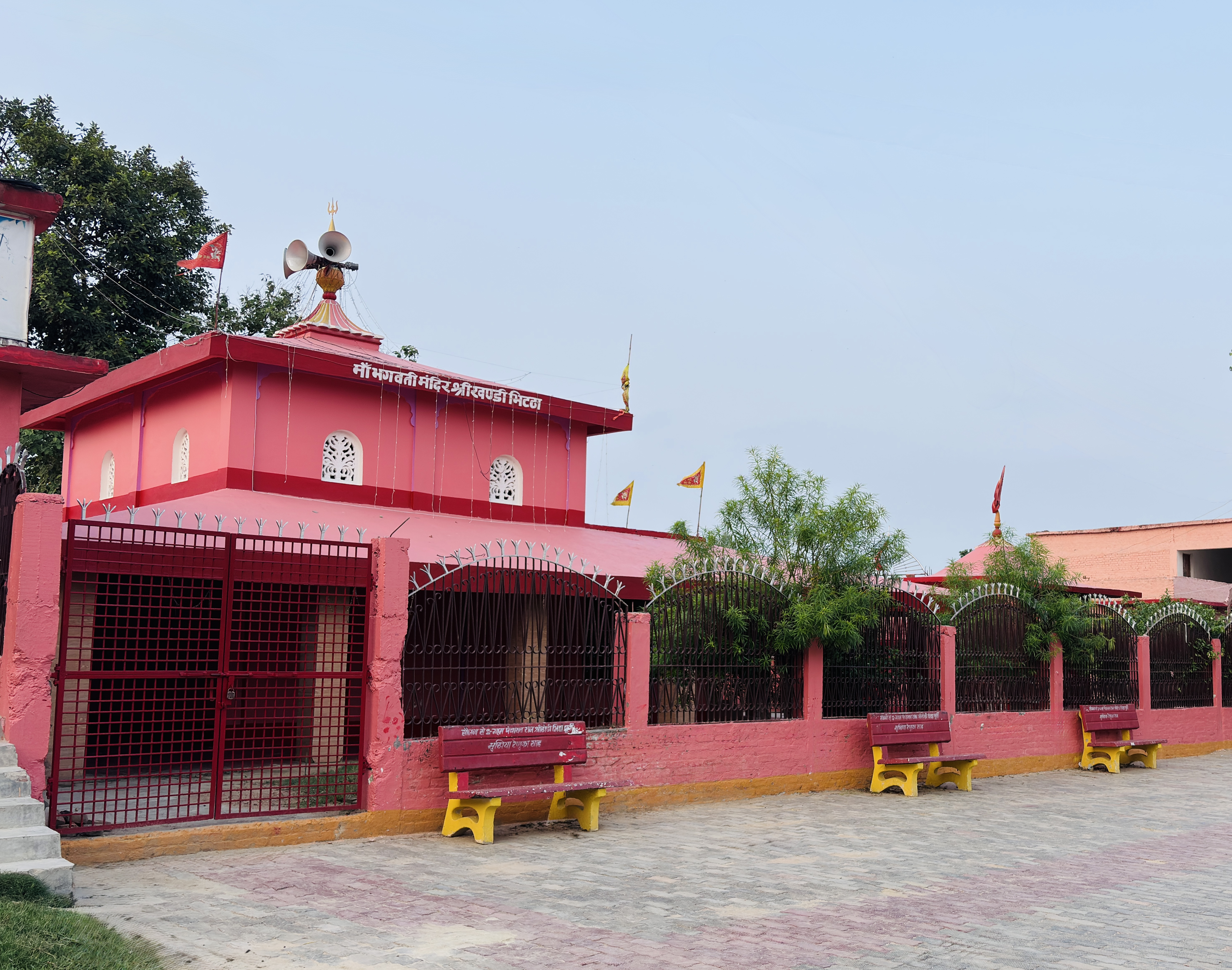
Maa Bhagwati temple premises.

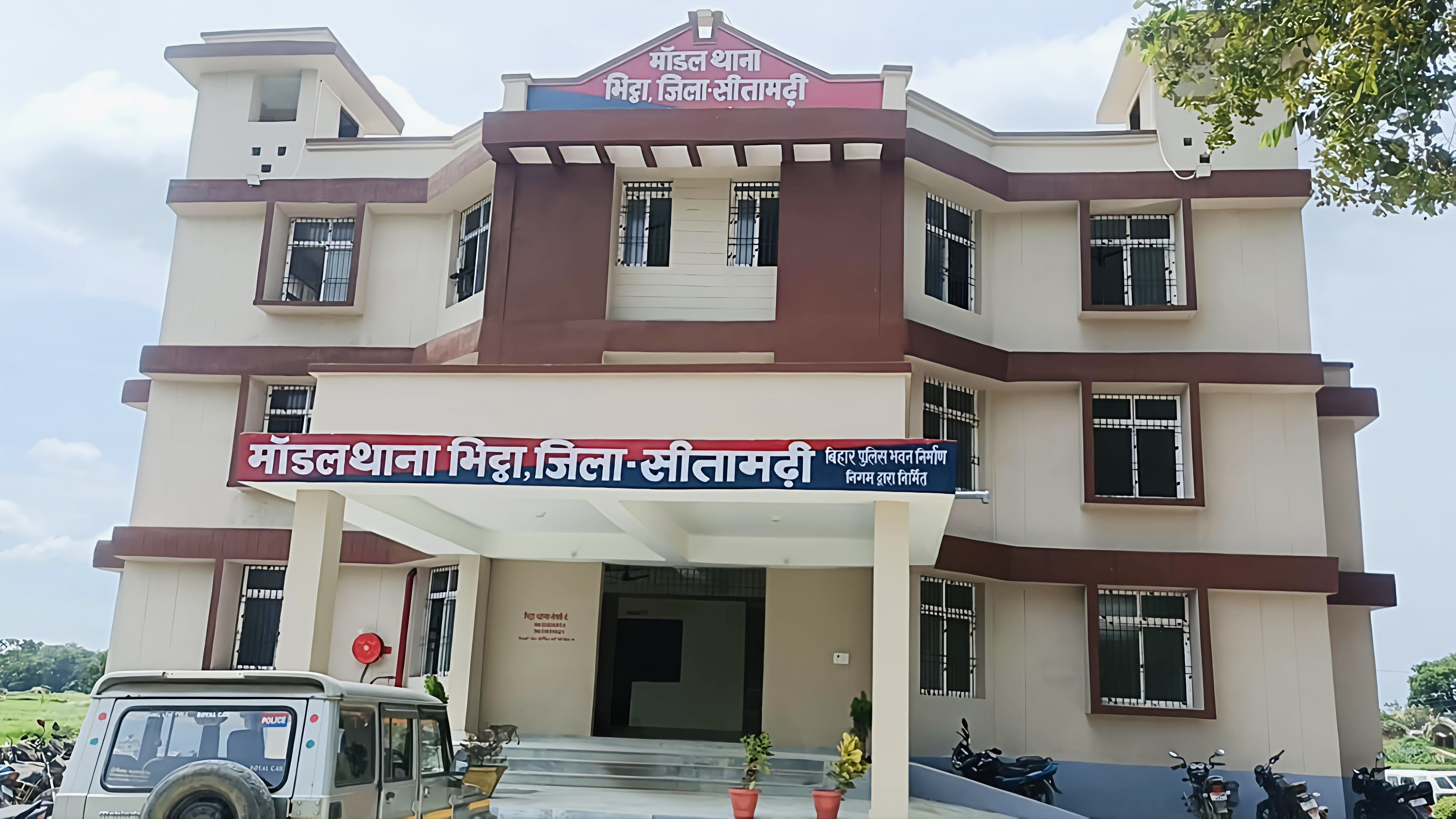
Model police station, Bhittha

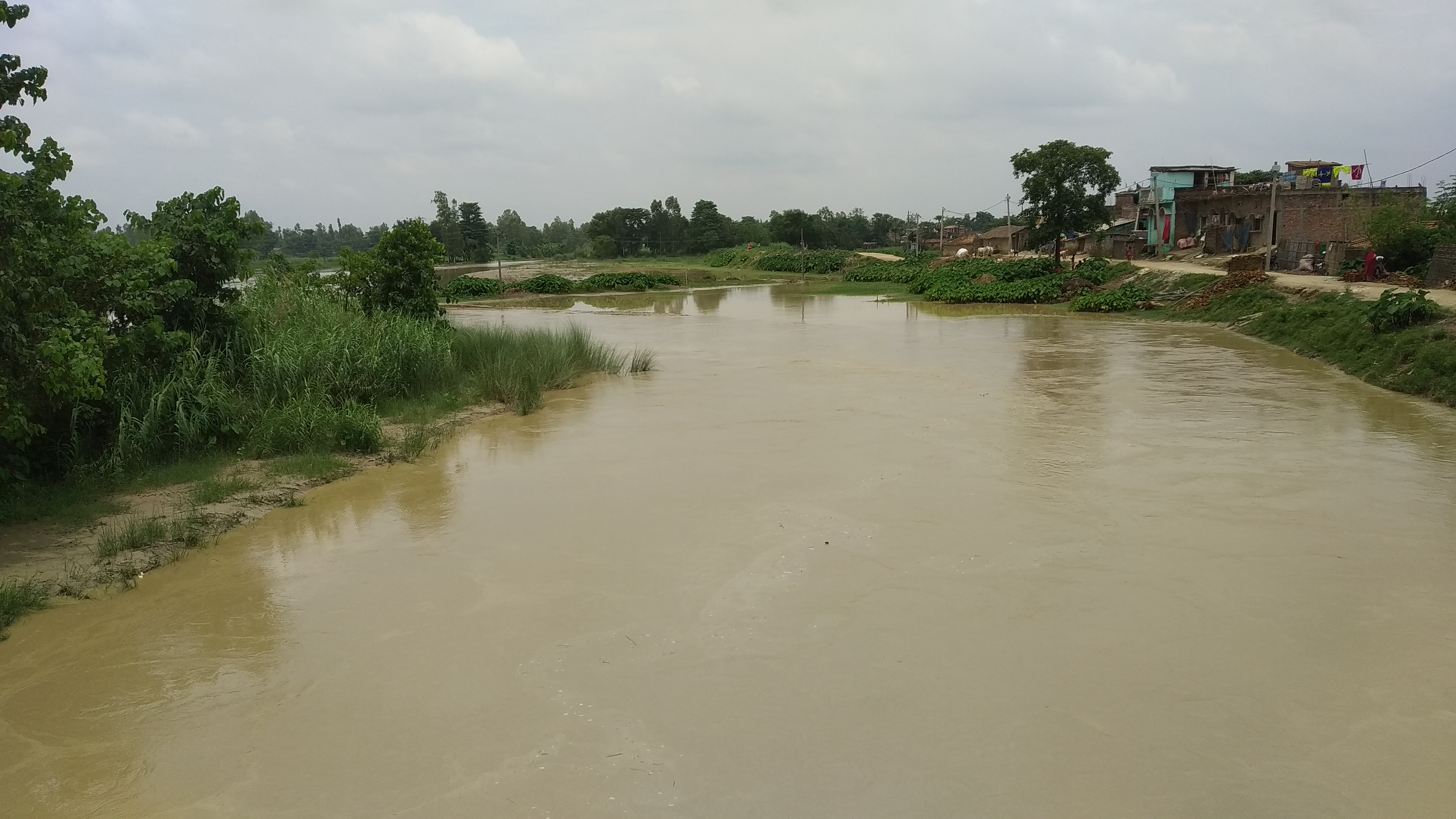
Raato River

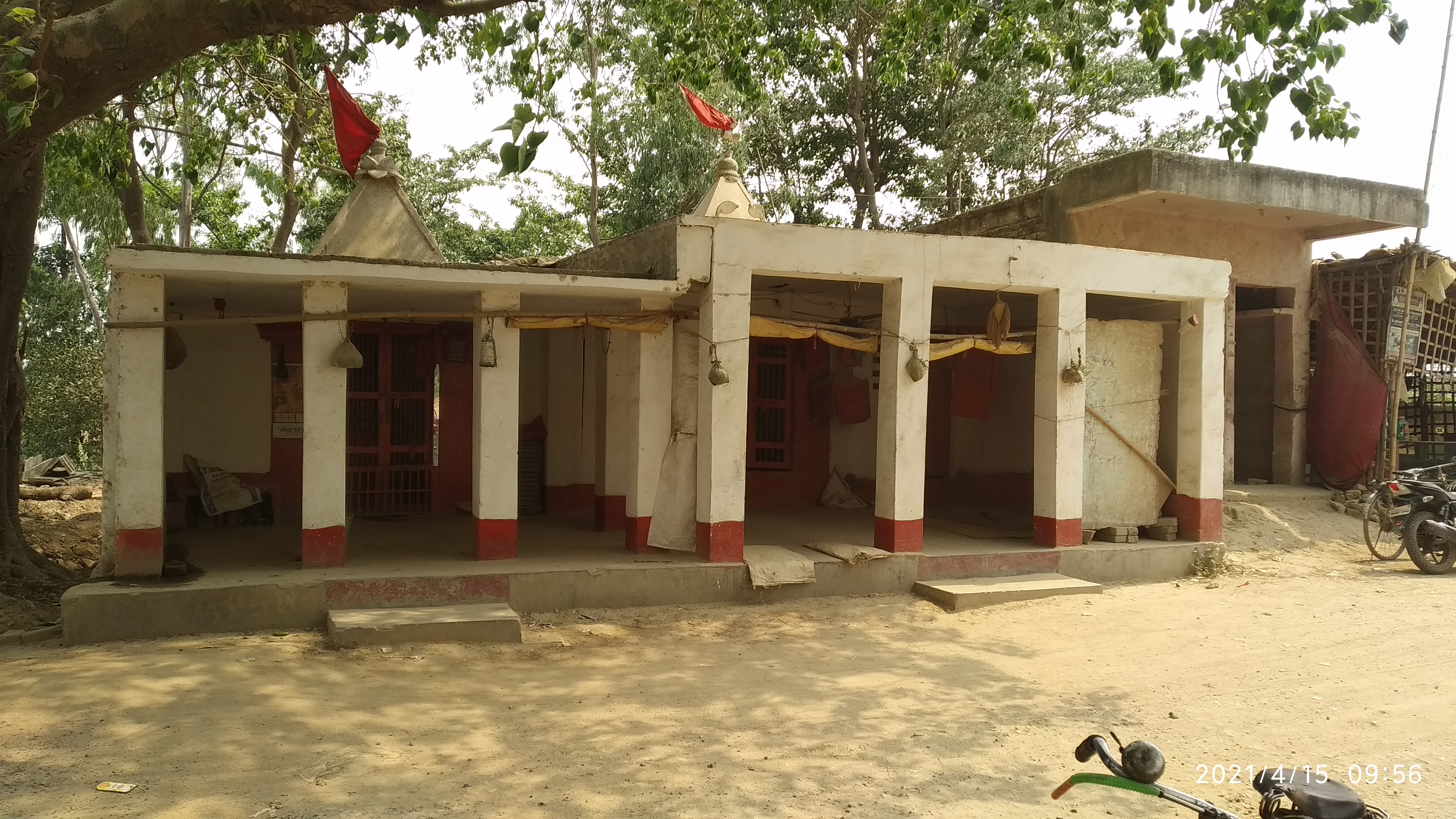
Hanuman mandir near Raato bridge.

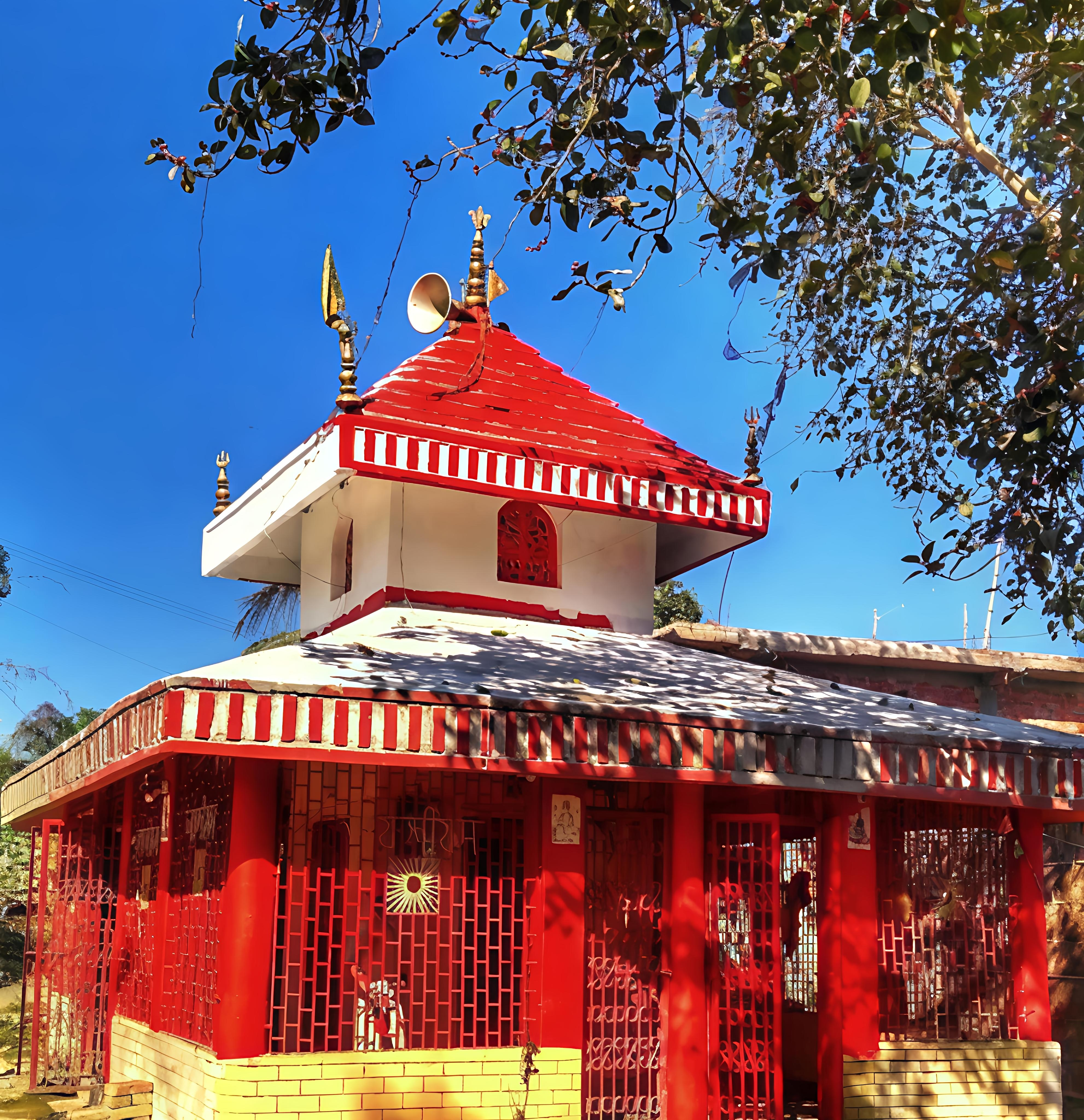
Mahavir Sthan.

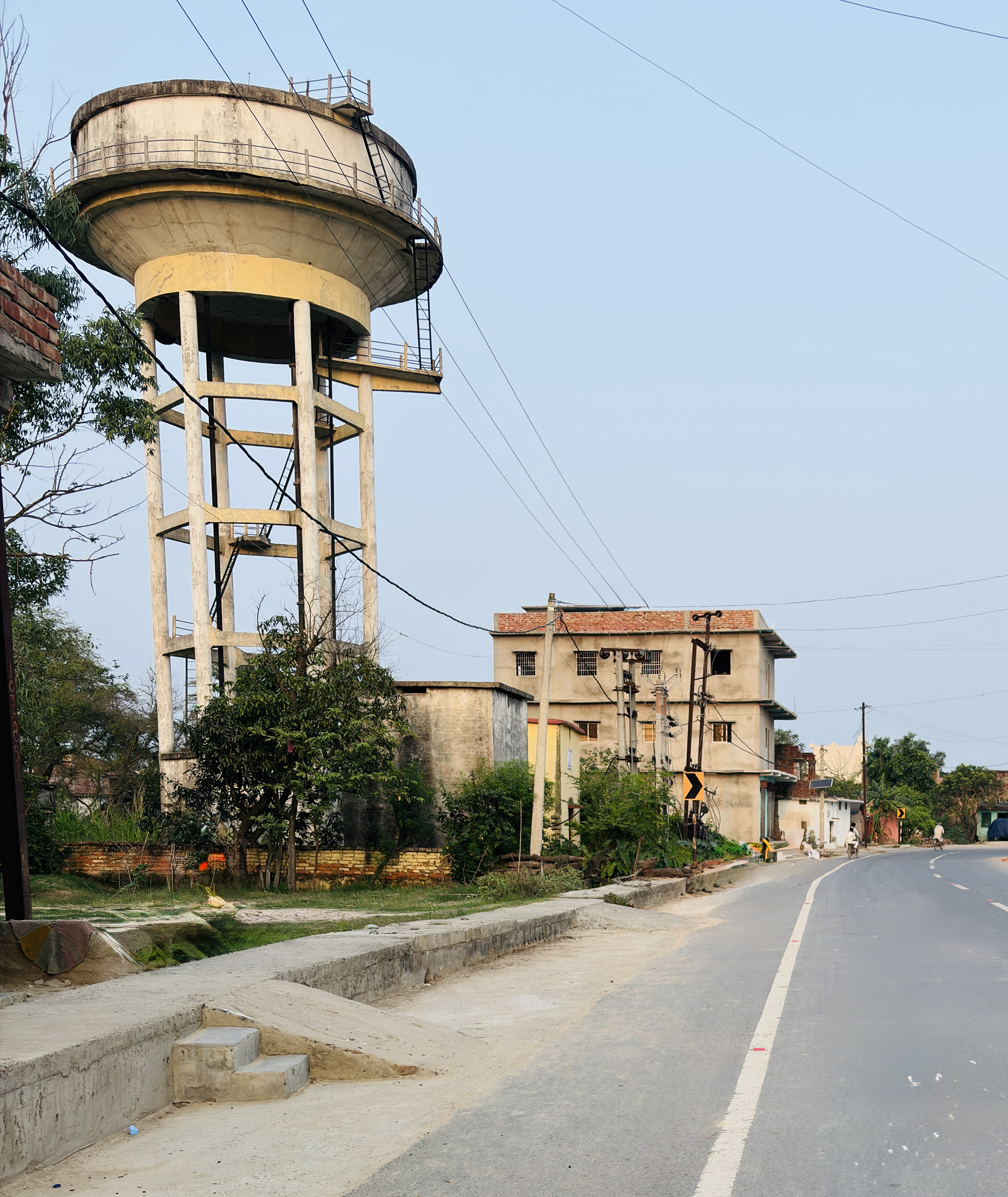
Main overhead water tank located near NH-227.

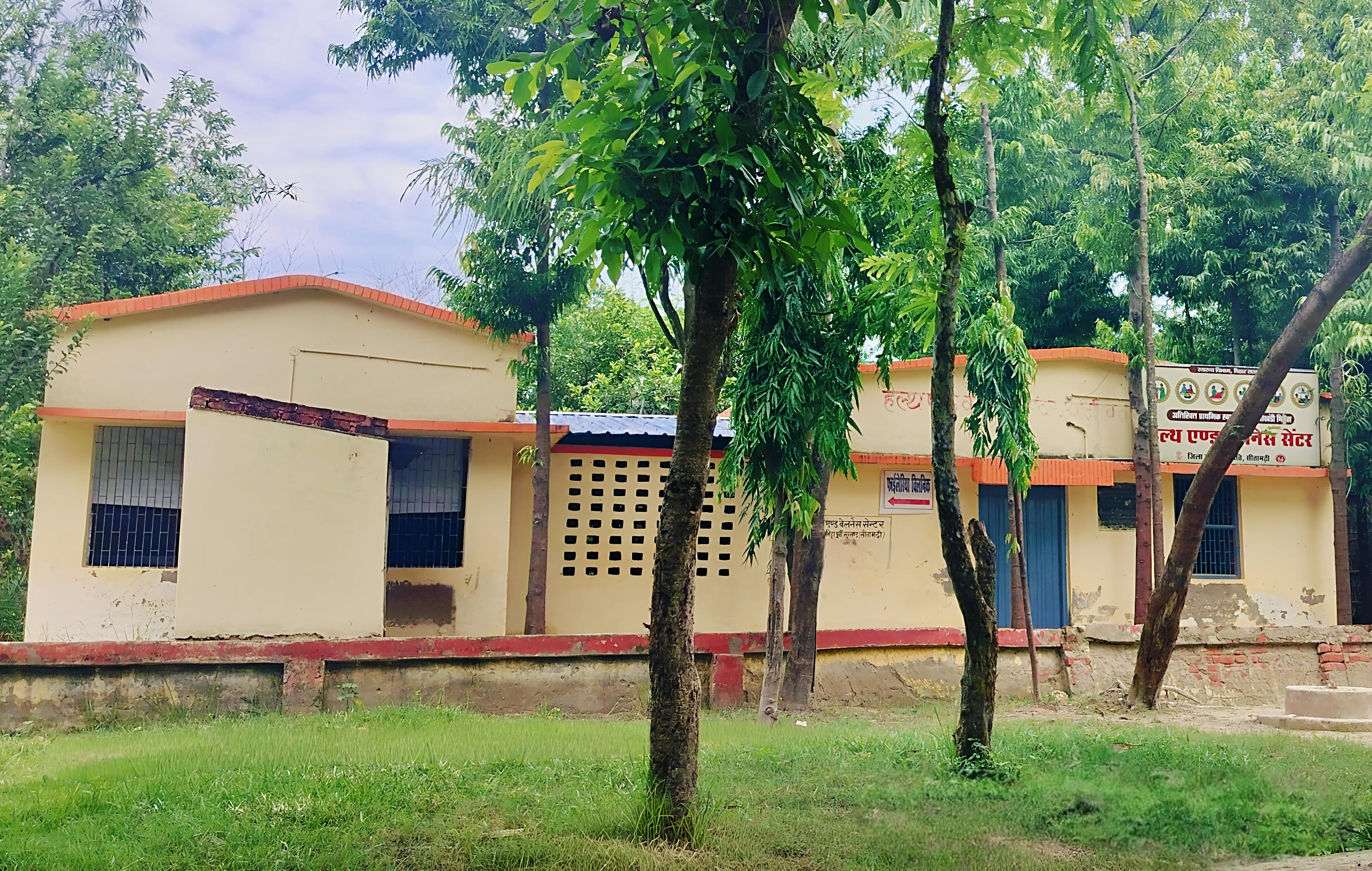
Health and wellness centre, APHC Shrikhandi Bhittha

== See also ==
- Borders of India
