= Basuki Bihari =

- Village
- Basuki Behari
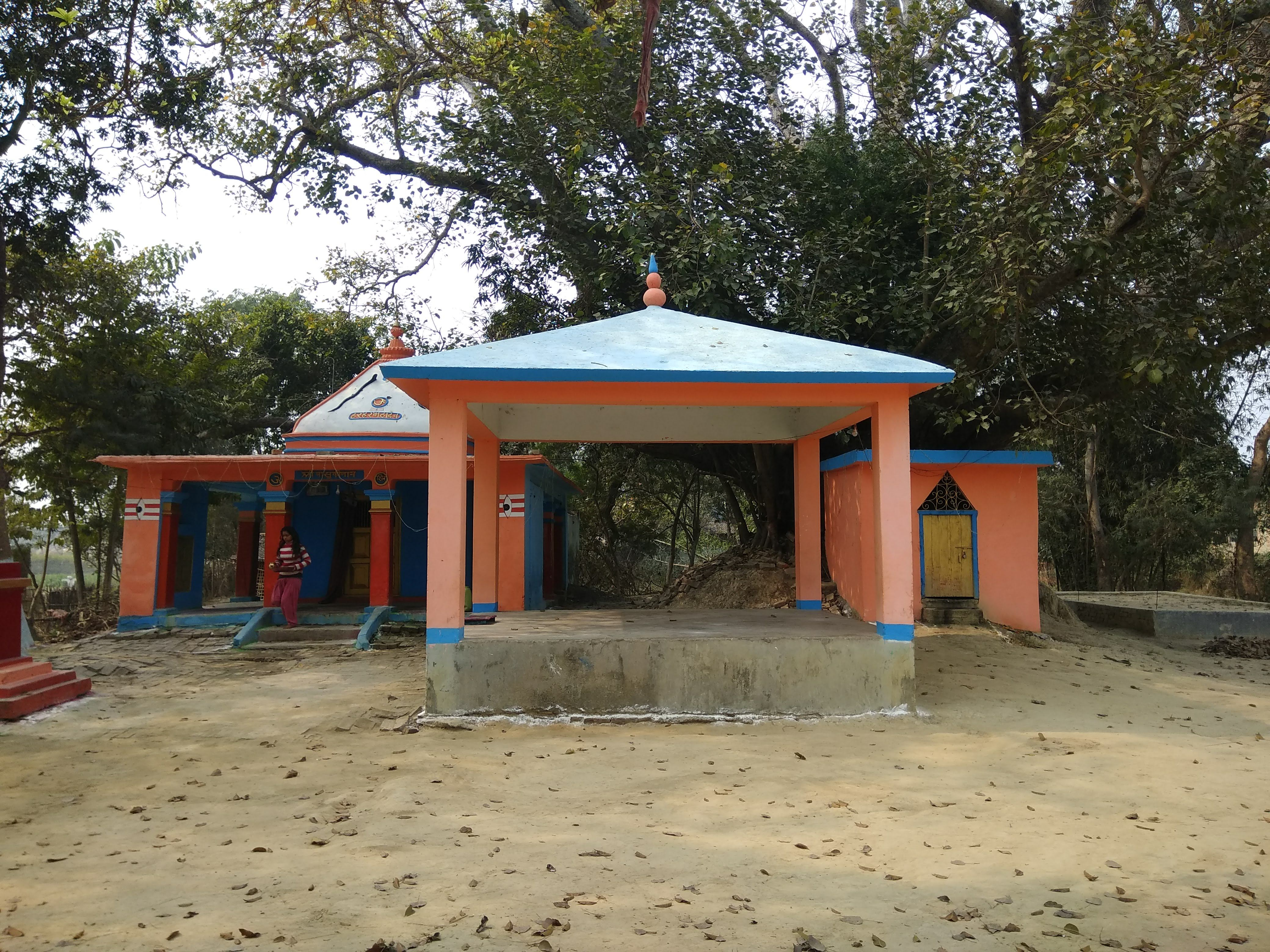
- The campus of the temples of the presiding deity Basuki Nath Mahadev and Gram Devata Brahma Baba of the village
- Nickname: Bihari
- Interactive map of Basuki Bihari
- Coordinates: 26.58509°N 85.84161°E
- Country: India
- State: Bihar
- Region: Mithila
- Lok Sabha Constituency: Madhubani
- Assembly Constituency: Harlakhi
- District: Madhubani
- Block: Madhwapur
- Founder: Chaudhary Family
- Named for: Basuki Nath Mandir
- Demonym: Maithil

Census 2011
  - Population: 14385
  - Literacy: 52.79%
  - Sex Ratio: 1012 : 1000

Languages
  - Official: Local language; Ancient language: Hindi; Maithili; Sanskrit
- Postal code: 847305

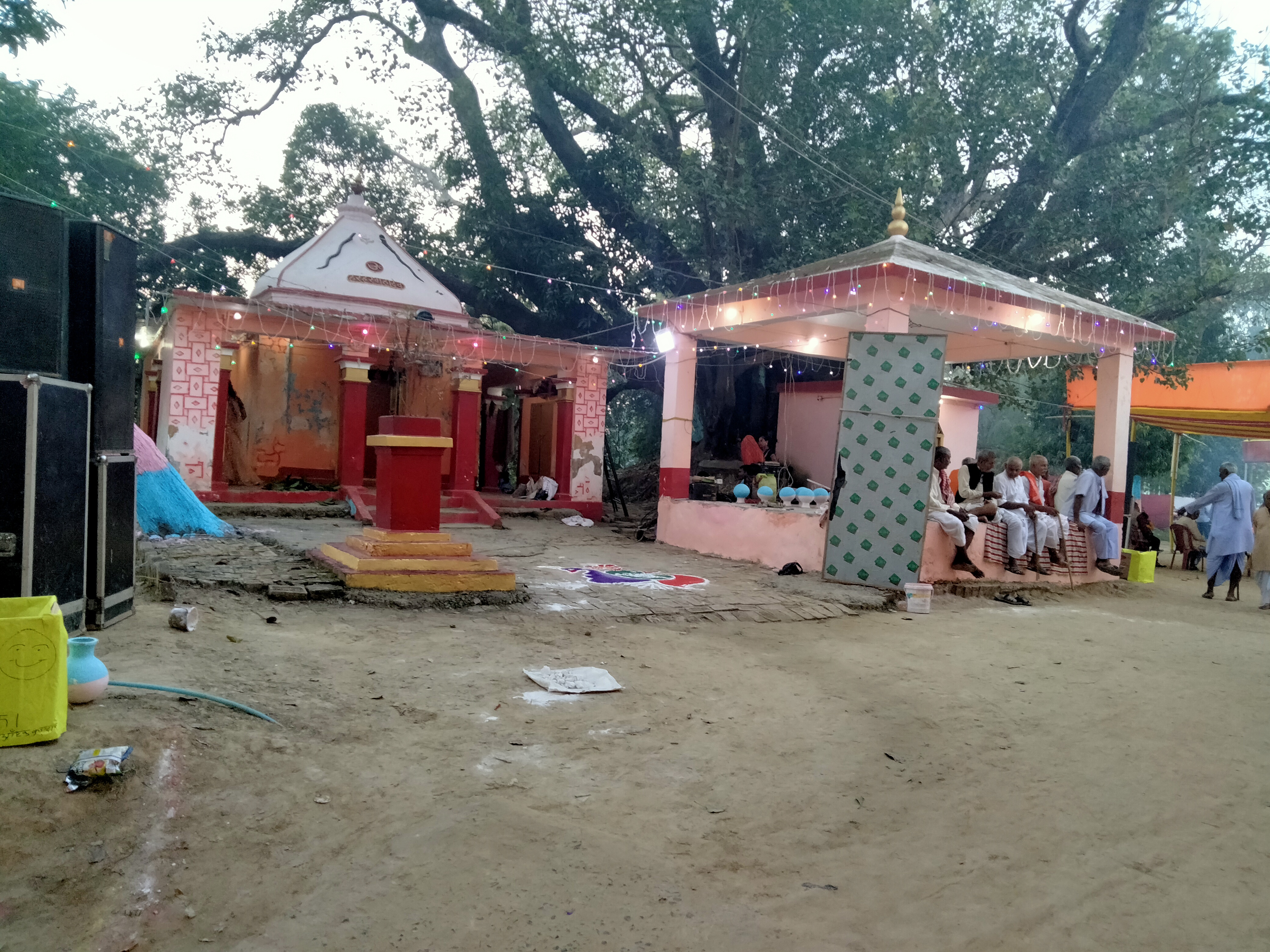
The view of Basuki Nath Mahadev Mandir at Basuki Bihari North during Chhath festival 2022.

Basuki Bihari is a village in the Madhubani district in State of Bihar, India. In the historical document Report of the Committee on Indian Trade Statistics, 1905, the village was called Basuki Behari. According to India Population Census 2011 the population of the village is 14385. The majority of people of this village speak in Maithili language. The total area of the village is 13.62 km^{2}. The village is divided into two Gram Panchayat (Village Committee) Basuki Bihari North and Basuki Bihari South. The head of the Gram Panchayat is called as Mukhiya. Mukhiya is elected by adult people of the village. The election of Mukhiya is held by the Election Commission of Bihar state. This village is known for social cultural activities like Durga Puja, Chhath, Kali Puja, Sarswati Puja and Chaurchan also known as Chauthchandra. The village is connected by State Highway No 75 from Darbhanga to Madhwapur. This village is only two kilometres far from the Indo-Nepal Border at Madhwapur in Madhubani district. During the festival of Vivah Panchami in Mithila, the processions of Ram Baraat coming from Ayodhya pass through the village of Basuki Bihari, while their journey to Janakpur.

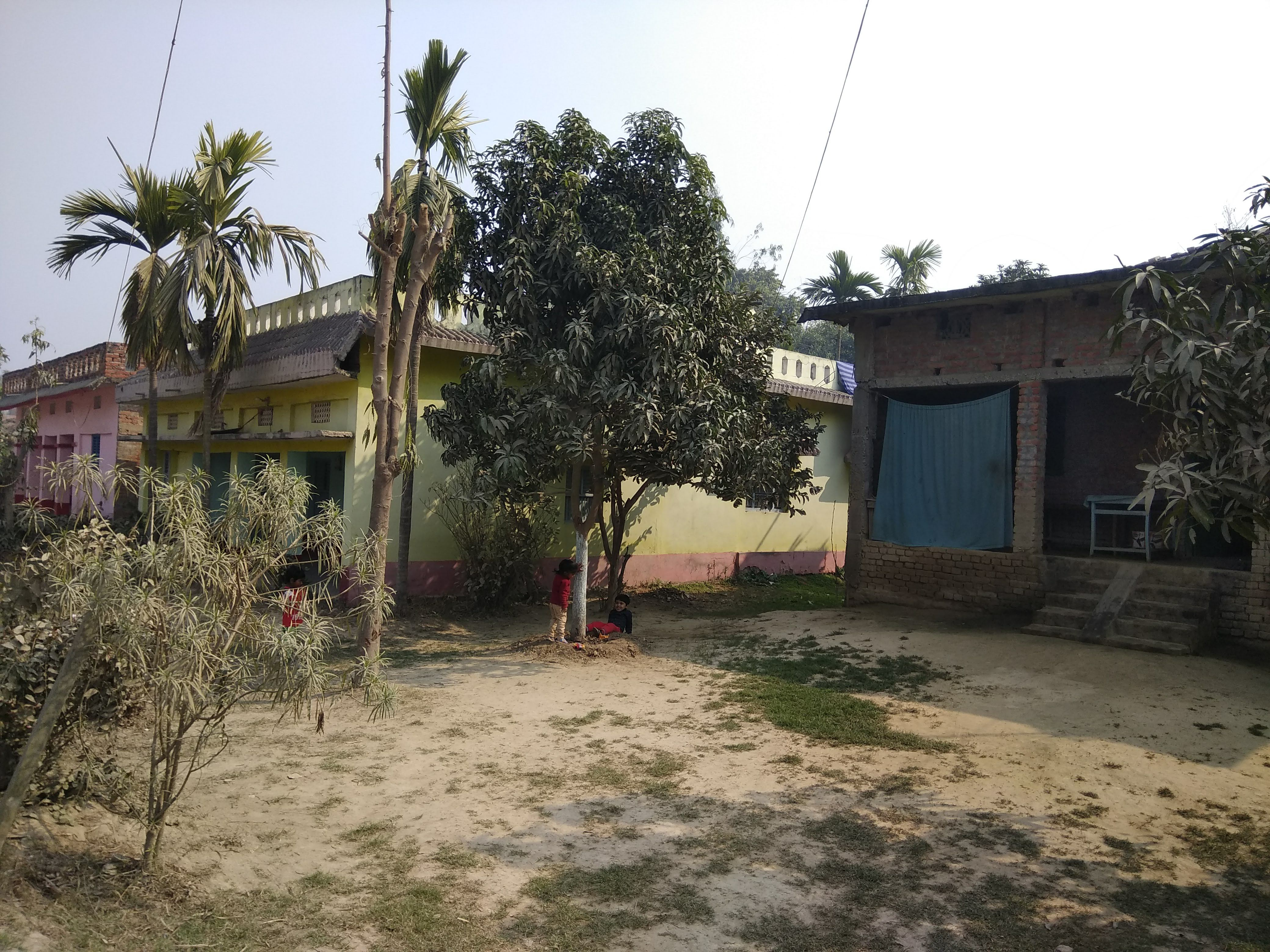
Chaudhary Tol - The residencial locality of the Dihi (early ancestors) of the village.

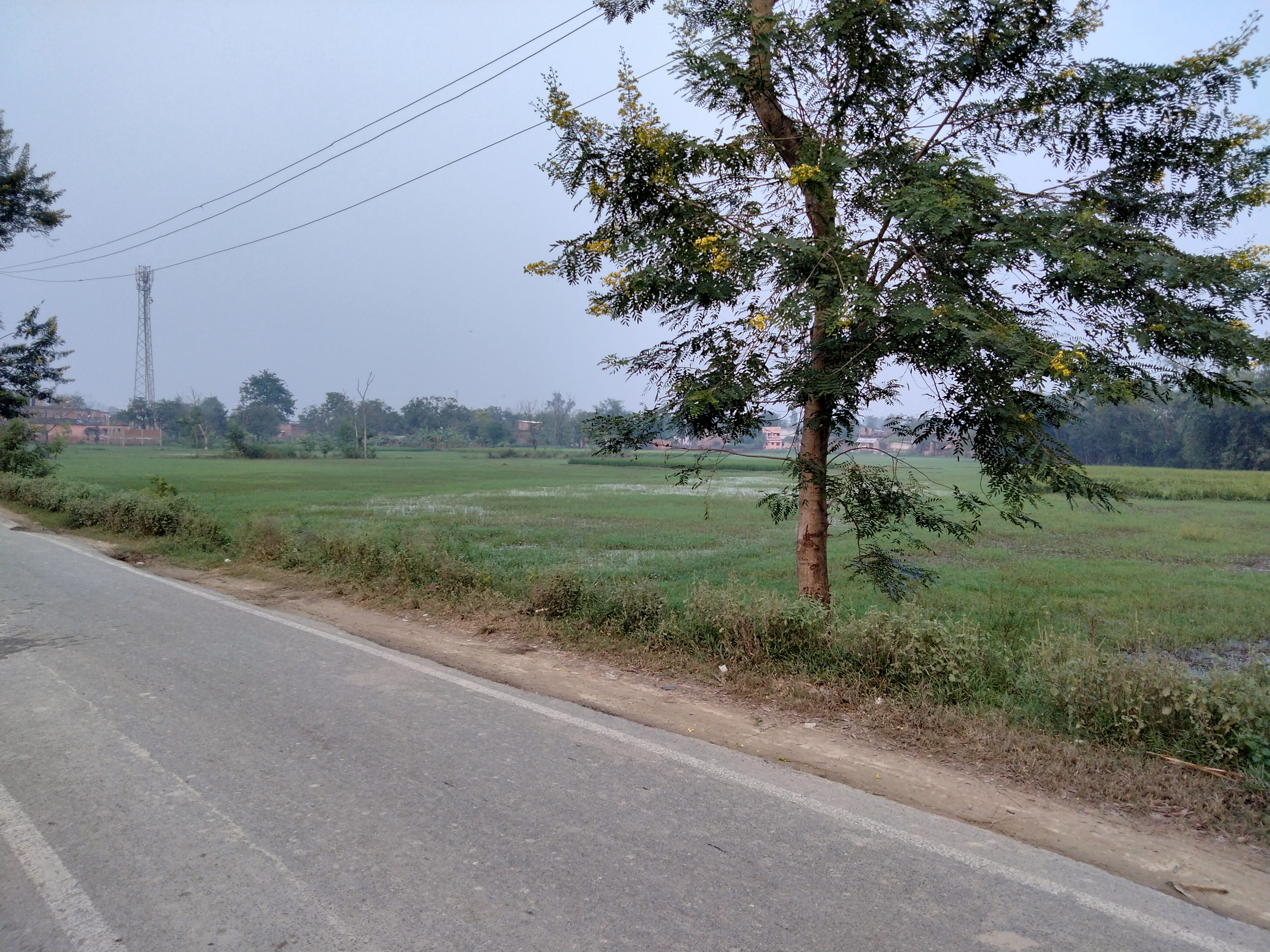
State Highway 75, Basuki Bihari North

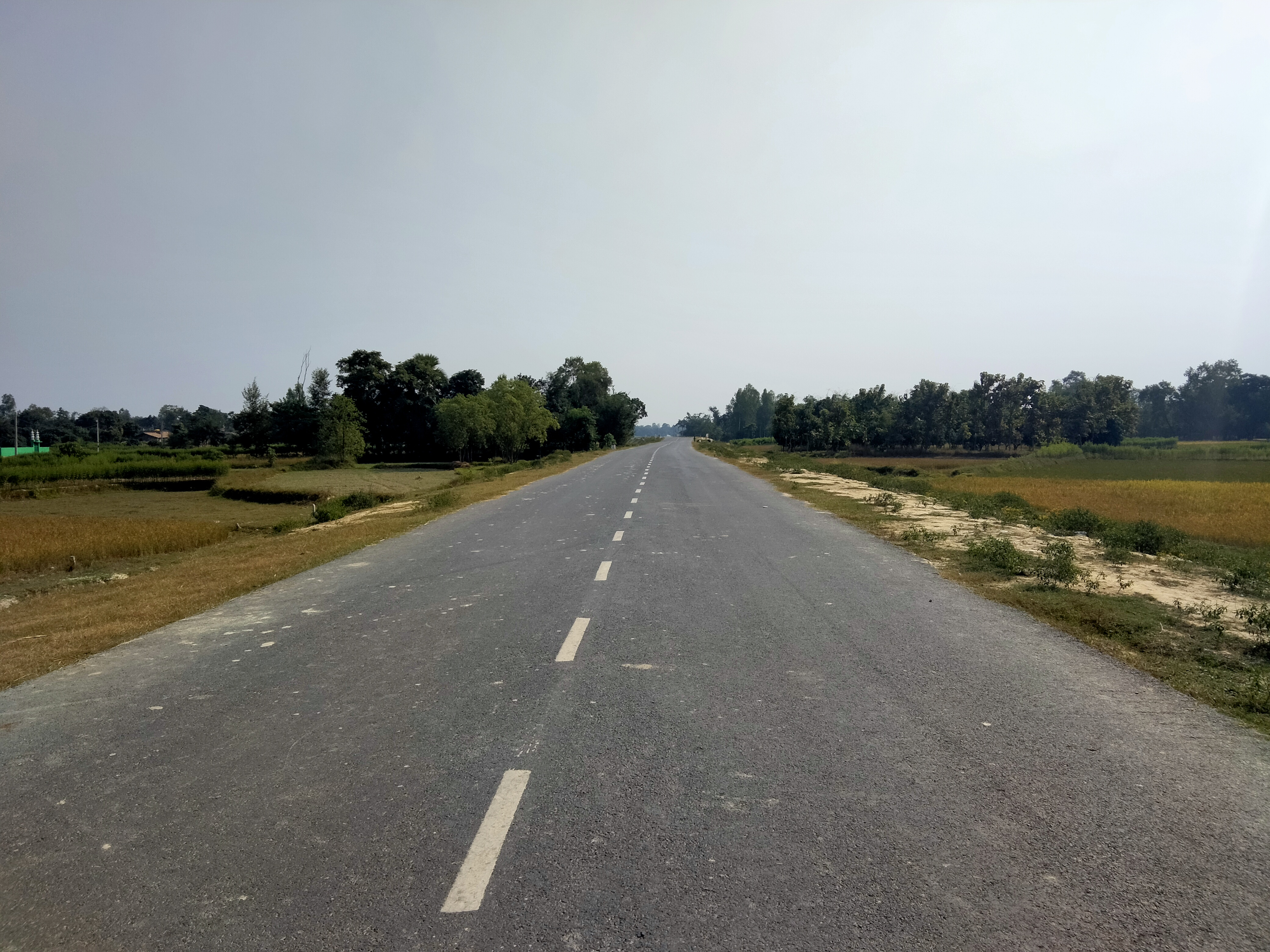
Indo - Nepal Border Highway at Basuki Bihari North

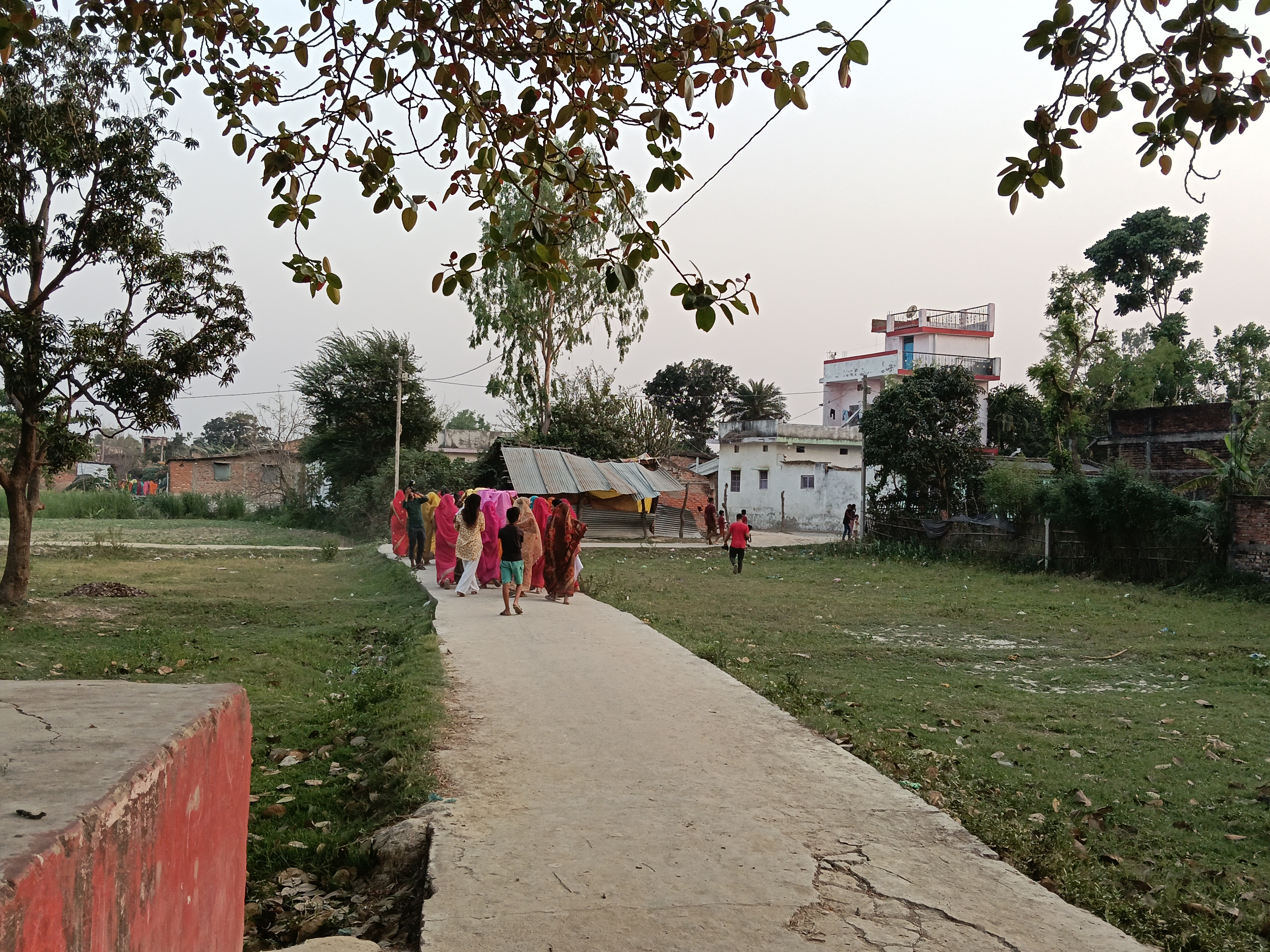
View of the locality near the Chaudhary Pokhair in the village.

== Etymology ==
The name of the village is made by two naming words of Lords in Hinduism "Basuki" and "Bihari". Basuki is the name of Lord Shiva. Similarly, Bihari is used for symbolising Lord Rama and Krishna and the God in Hinduism. In the village there two old temples of Lord Shiva named as Lord Baba Basuki Nath at the two ends of the village. The first temple is at Basuki Bihari North named Baba Basuki Nath Mahadev Mandir. The second temple of Lord Shiva is at Basuki Chowk in Basuki Bihari South with same naming. In the village there is a place name as Naya Janakpur where Lord Rama temple was built. There is also a Hanuman temple at Naya Janakpur. Therefore, the name of the village is originated from the presence of these temples.

== Demographics ==
As of 2011, the number of families residing in this village is 2913. The total population of the village is 14385, of which 7149 are male while 7236 are females.

The sex ratio of Basuki Bihari village is 1012 females to 1000 males on average. Among children, this ratio is on average 996 females to every 1000 males.

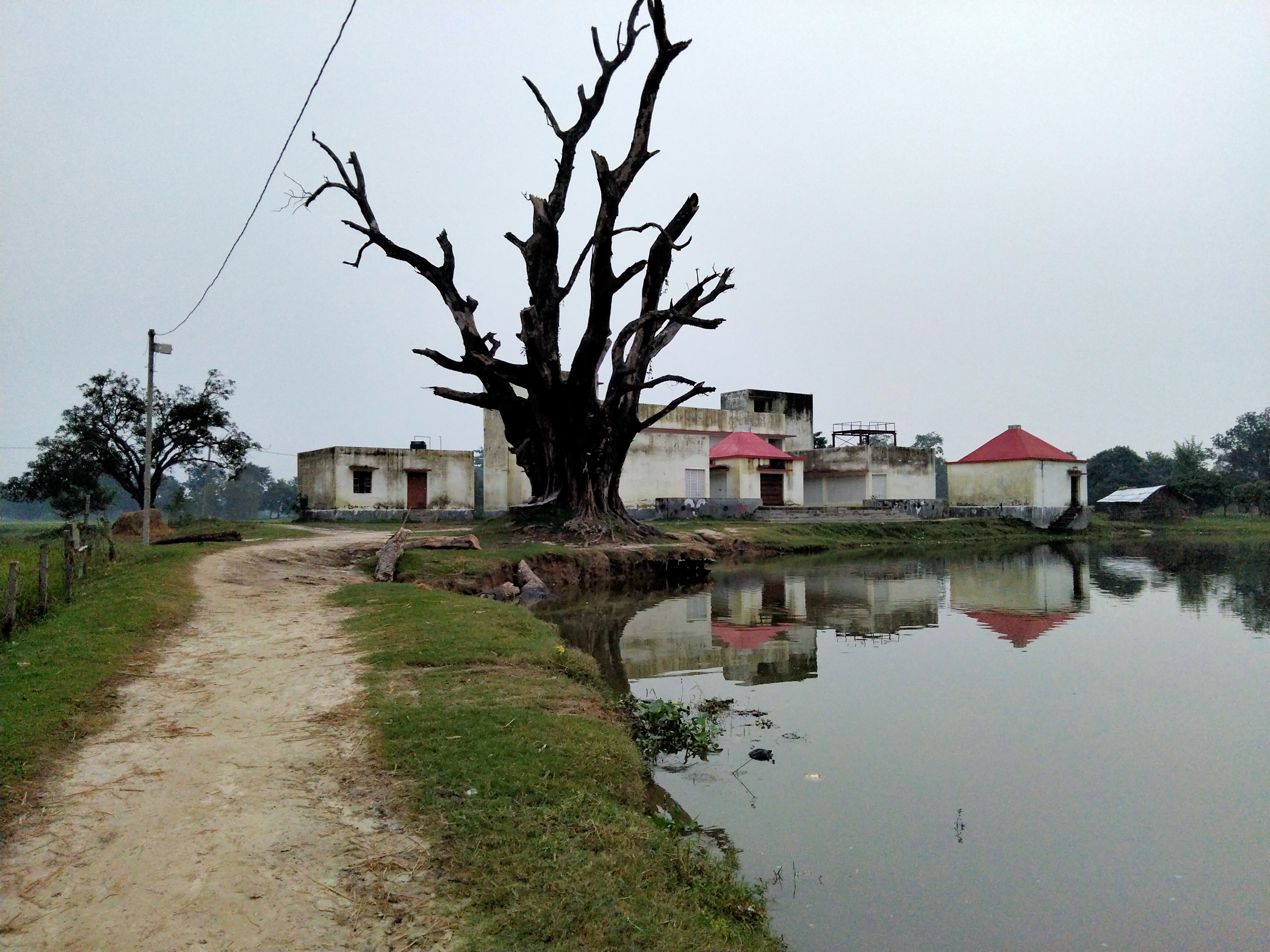
Grampanchayat Raj, Basuki Bihari North

In 2011, the literacy rate of Basuki Bihari village was 52.79%, with literacy among males at 64.48% and 41.29% among females.

== Places of interest ==
There are many places in this village which have both religious and historical backgrounds. Some of them are listed below.

1. Basuki Nath Mandir is a temple of lord Shiva. Maithil Brahmin were very devoted to lord Shiva. Chaudhary family of Basuki Bihari built this temple in devotion to lord Shiva. The exact date of foundation of the temple is unknown. This is one of the oldest temple in this area. The Pipal tree north to the temple is also a very old tree. At the time of Chhath and Mahashivratri festivals, the temple is richly decorated. A pond, known as Chaudhary Pokhair, is situated in front of the temple.
2. Maharani Sthan is a Hindu temple located at Basuki Bihari North village of Madhubani district in Bihar, India. It is very old temple. It is believed that the temple was initially built by Chaudhary family residing in this village. The temple was rebuilt again some years ago. It is the temple of Goddess Bhagwati.
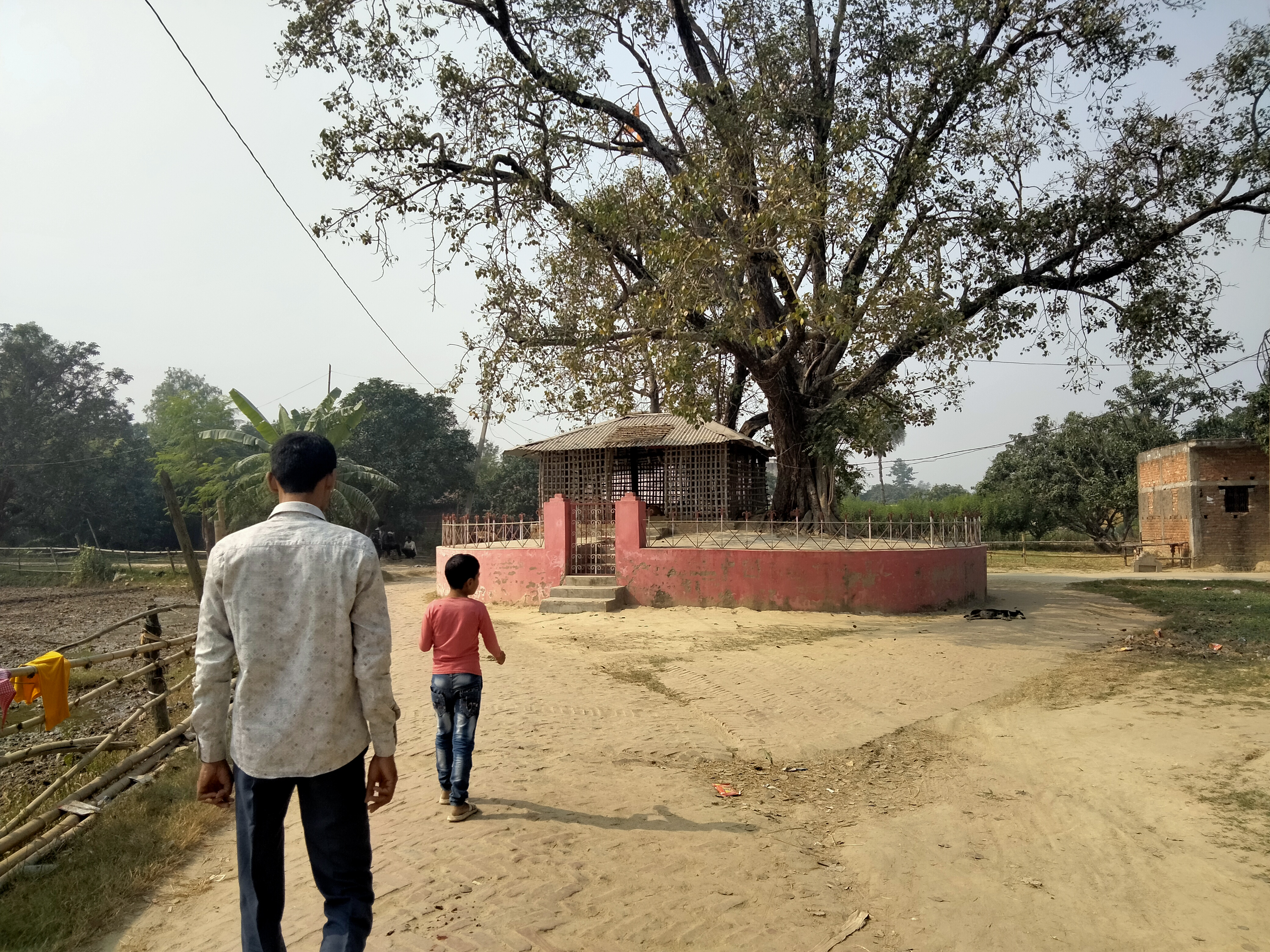
3. Sati Mai Sthan at Basuki Bihari North
  Sati Mai Sthan is a historical monument built to remember the sacrifice of the life of a Rajput lady Sati in mourning of her husband's martyrdom in a war just after the couple marriage.
4. Garhi is a historical site of Rajputs.
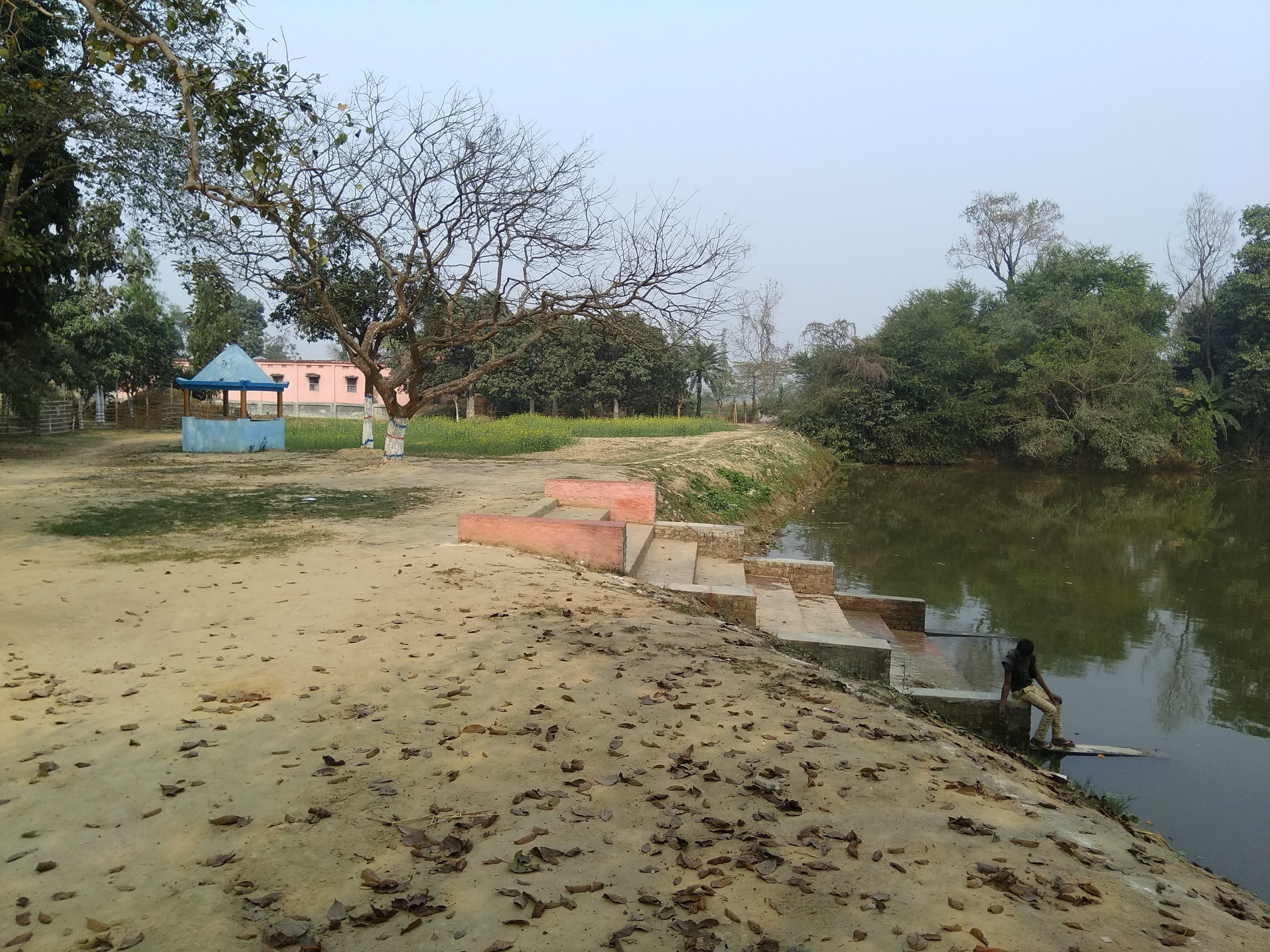
5. Chaudhary Ghat, Chaudhary Pokhair
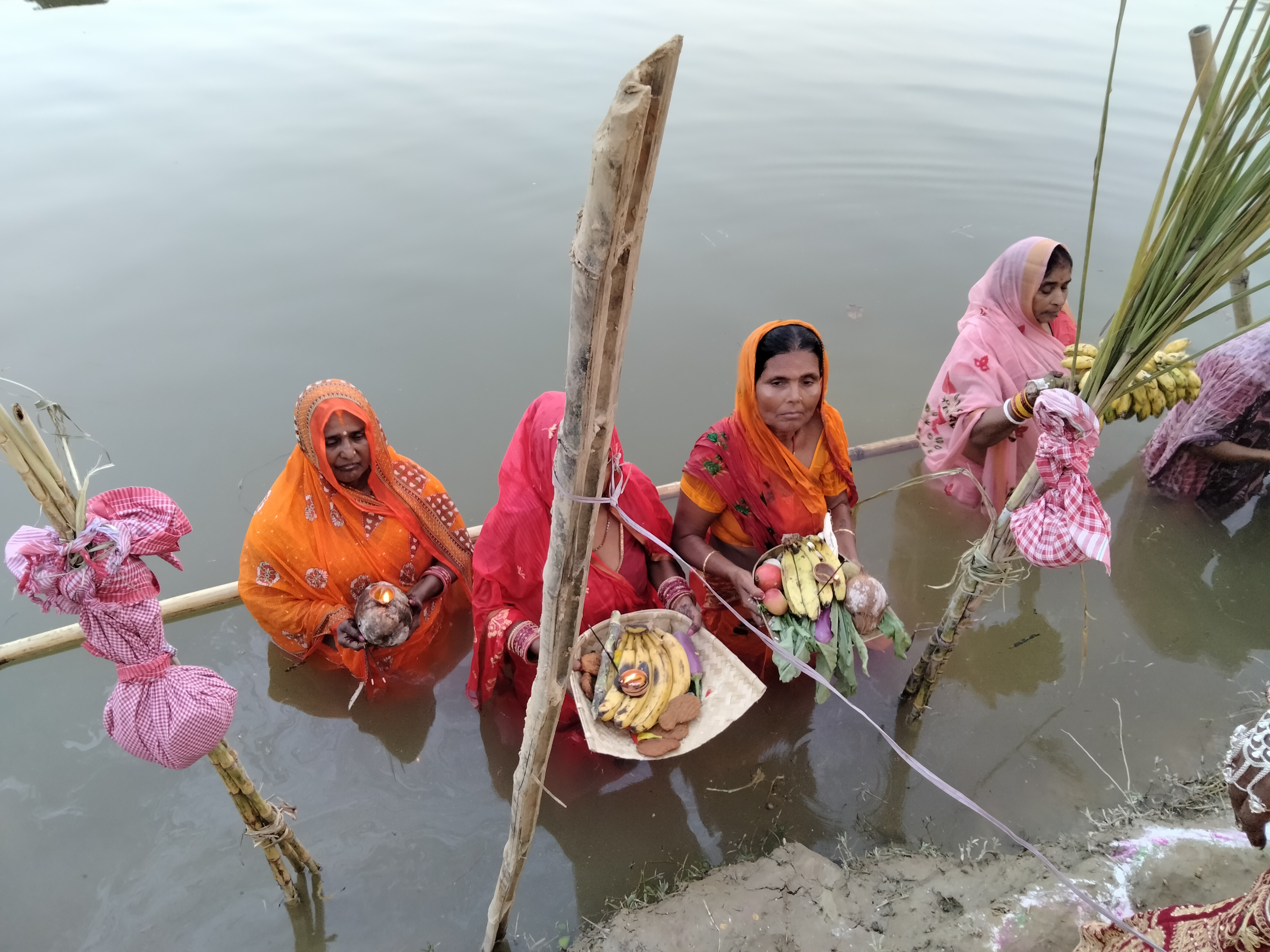
  Chhath Puja at Chaudhary Pokhair
  Chaudhary Pokhair is a pond which was built by Chaudhary family of Basuki Bihari North village. Since it is in front of Shiva temple, so this pond is considered as Ganga of this village. Many Hindu religious rituals are performed here. Karma-Kanda rituals of Hindu people are also performed here. It is the most holy pond in the village.
6. Bhavani Mandir is located at Thalhi.
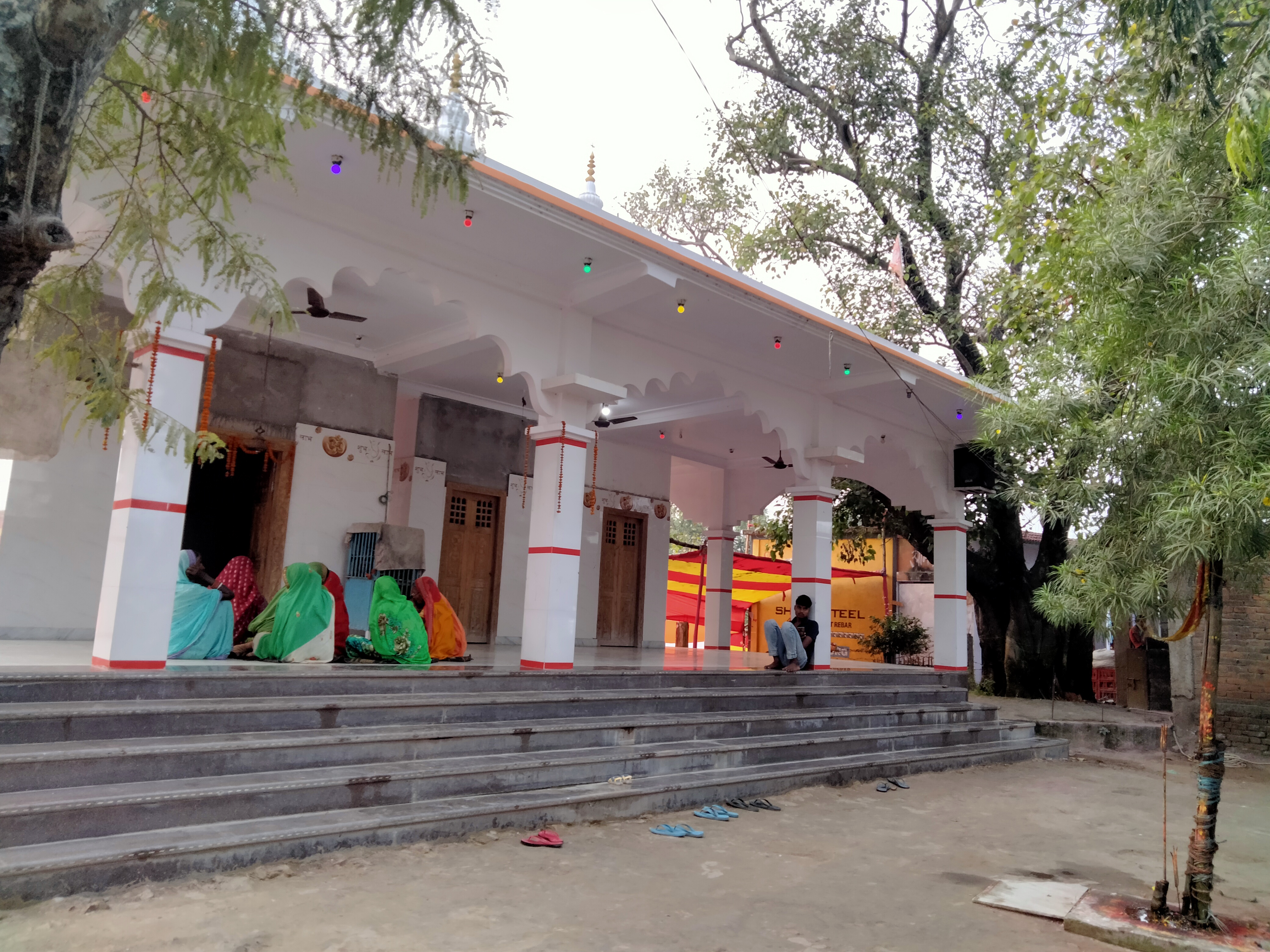
7. Shiva Mandir, Bajrang Bazar, Bihari
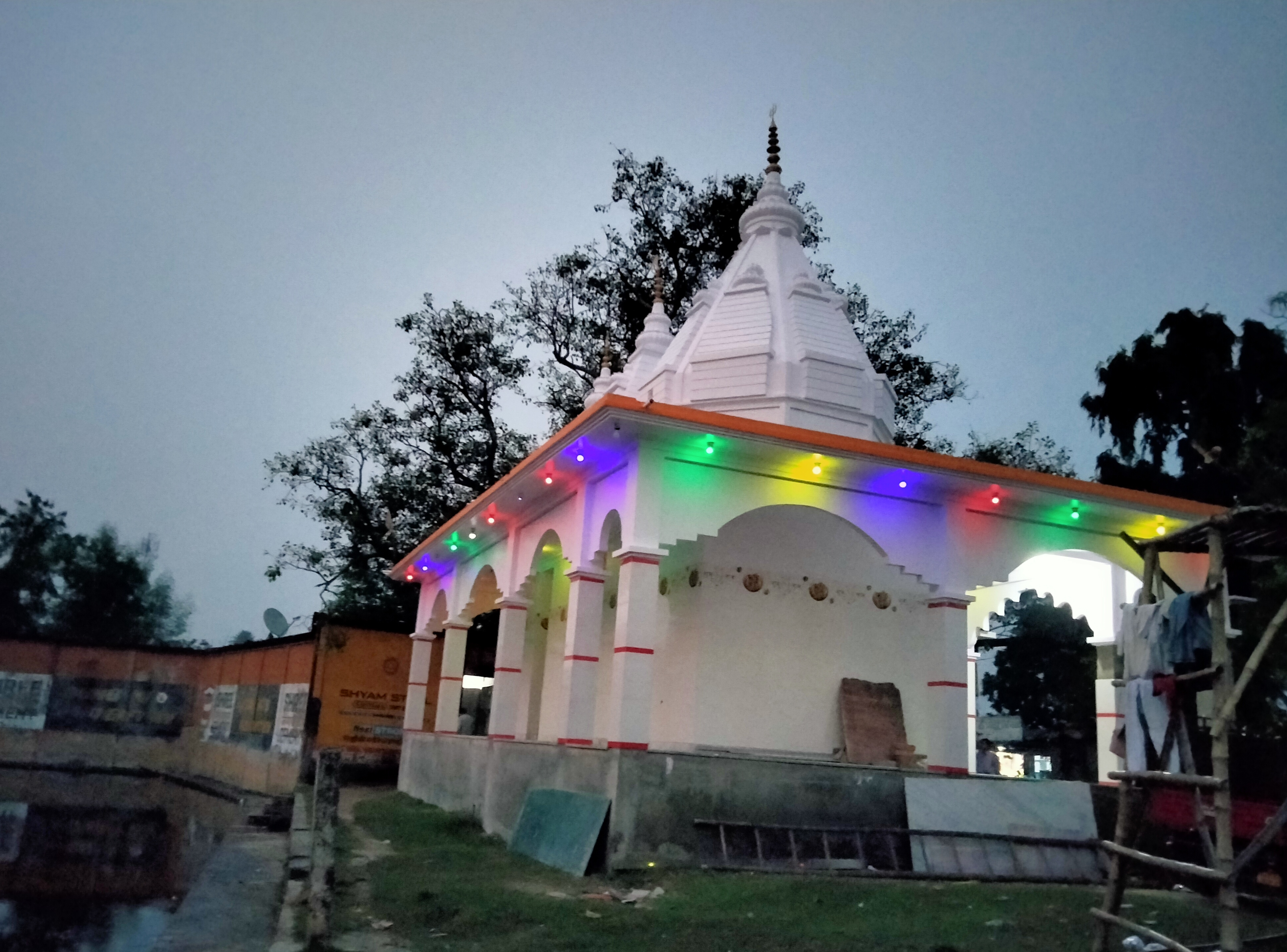
  Shiv Mandir, Bajrang Bazar, Basuki Bihari North
  Shiv Mandir, Bajrang Bazar
8. Mahadev Mandir, Shiromanipatti
9. Kali Mandir (Maithili: मां काली मंदिर): a Hindu temple dedicated to Goddess Kali. During the festival of Kali Puja, a large number of devotees flock to the temple for worshiping Goddess Kali. The temple is looked after by a social and cultural organisation called as Shree Kali Puja Samiti. The formal celebration of the Kali Puja festival in the campus of the temple started in the year 1993 by the Puja Committee with the help of the villagers. Every year the festival of Kali Puja is celebrated with a great pomp and show.
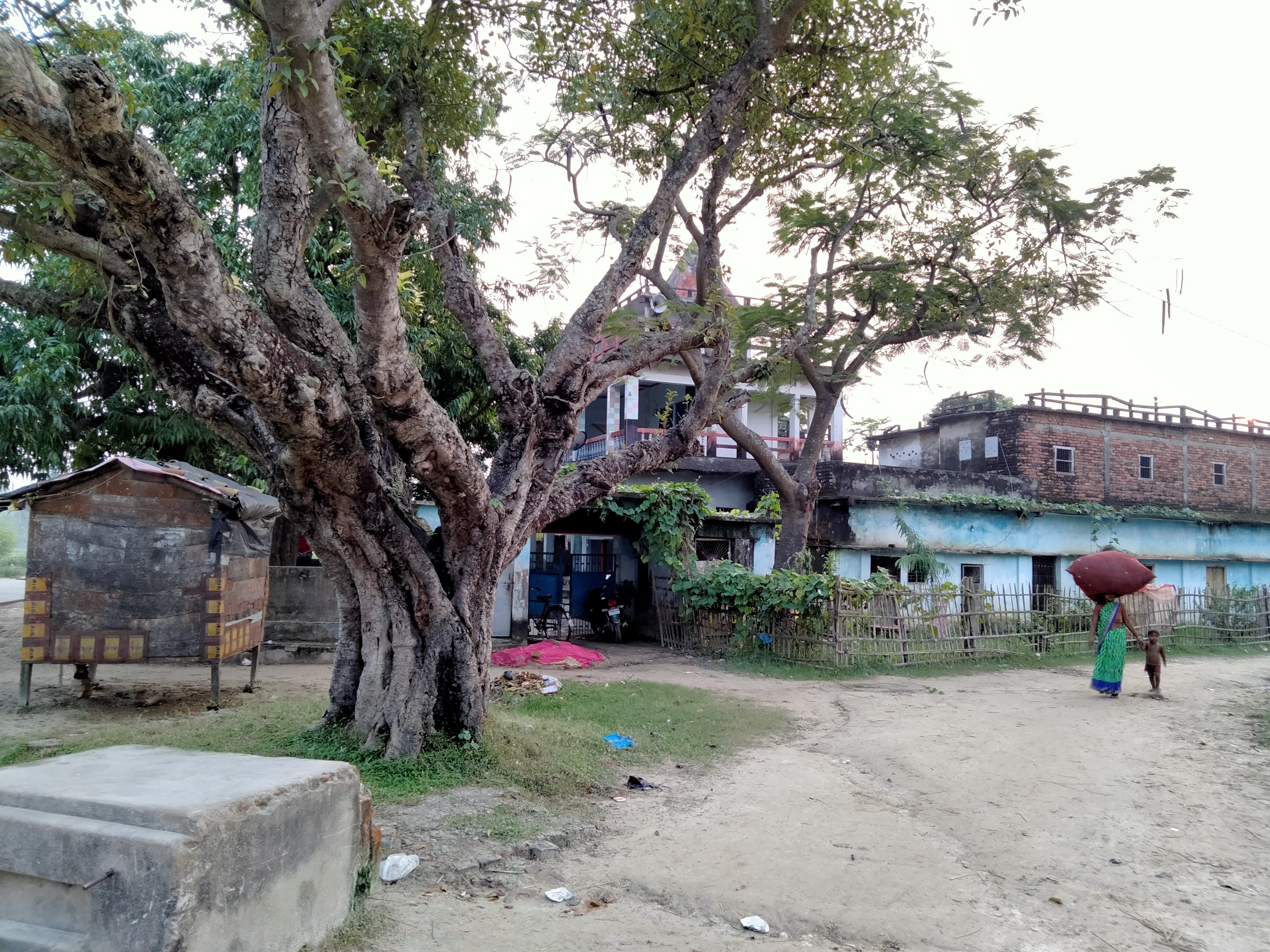
10. Naya Janakpur Mandir, Basuki Bihari
  Naya Janakpur Mandir is a Hindu temple at outskirt of Basuki Bihari North village of Madhubani district of Bihar, India. It was built by Agyaani Baba of this village in the devotion to Lord Rama.
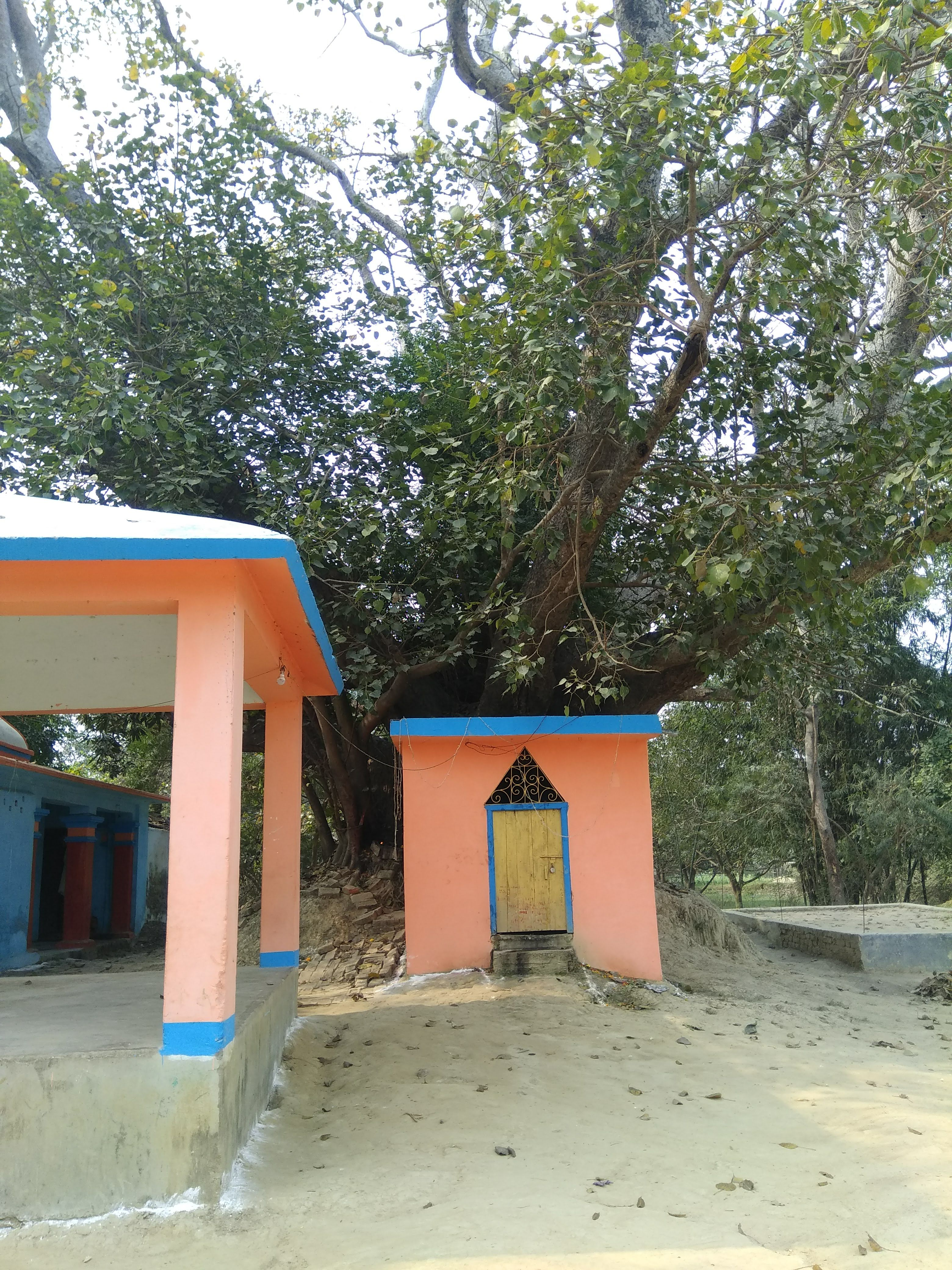
11. Brahm Baba Sthan, Bihari
  Brahm Baba Sthan

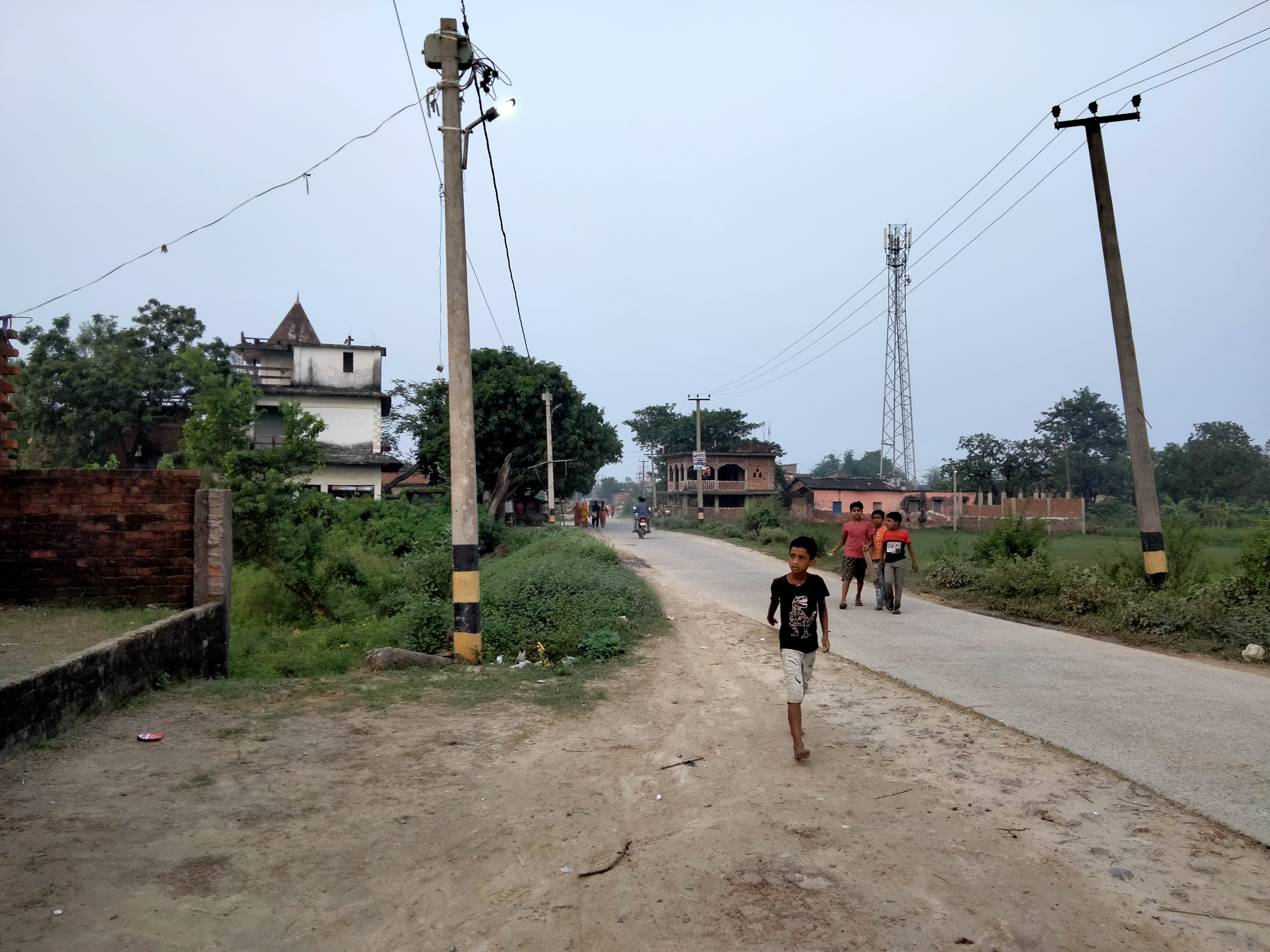
Naya Janakpur, Basuki Bihari North

12. Baba Palakeshwar Nath Mahadev Mandir - It is Lord Shiva's temple located at Parsa Tol, outskirts of the village. In the premises of the temple, there is a sacred pond. Its water is used for performing Jalabhisheka on the Shivalinga of the temple.

13. Jamuni Sangam Ghat is a sacred location near Brahmpuri Tol of the village. At this location, Jamuni river merges into the Dhouns River. It is natural location. There is a bridge known as Akharharghat Pul on the Dhouns River. It connects Brahmpuri Tol of the village to Akharharghat village.

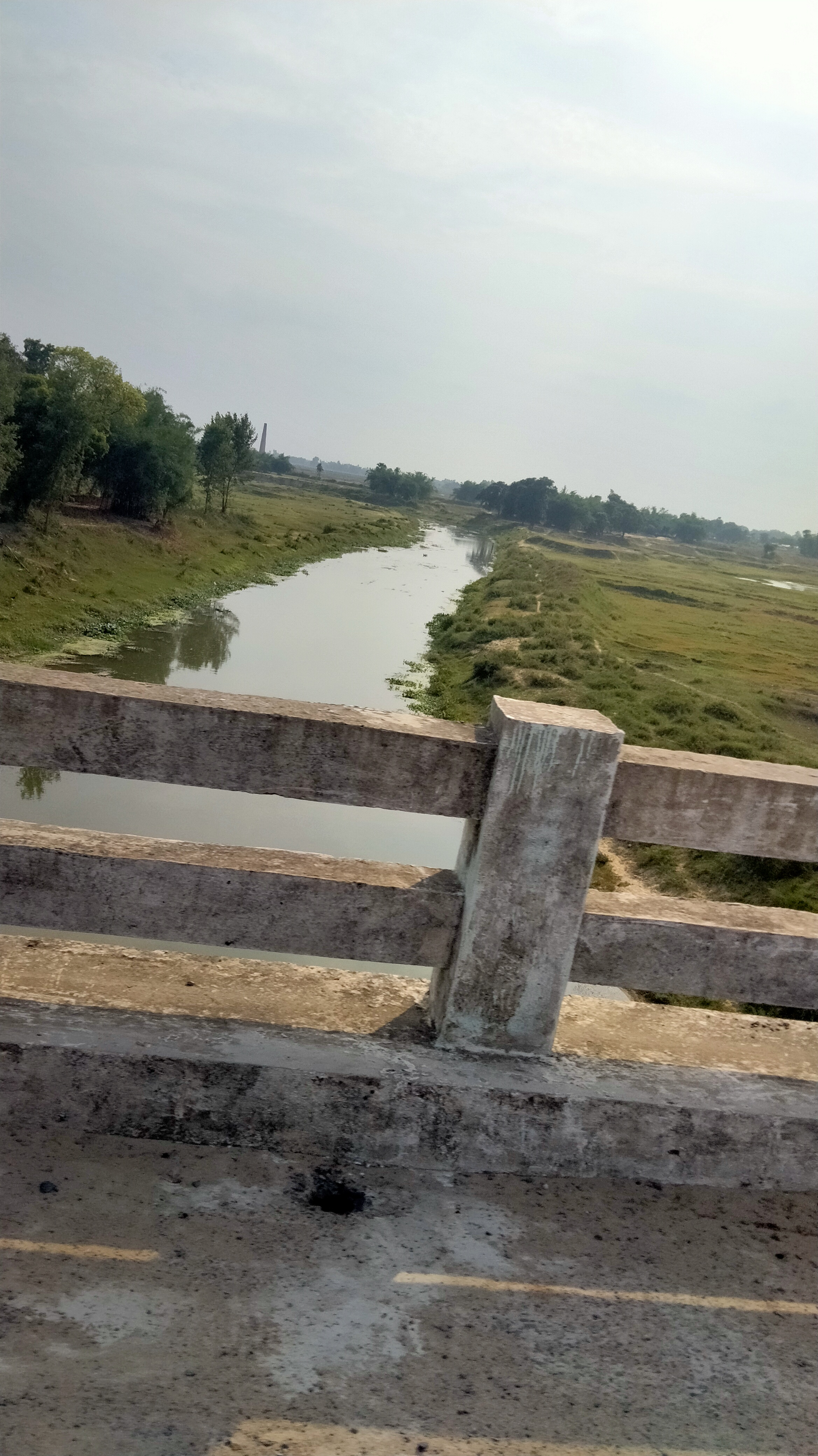
Natural view of the Dhouns River from the Akharharghat Pul near the village.

== Localities (Tols) ==
The village of Basuki Bihari is divided into several tols (around 22). The Tol refers to a smaller settlement or locality within the village. The major tols are Chaudhary Tol, Inrwa Tol, Siromanipatti, Garhi, Gopalpatti, Janakinagar, Basuki, Brahmapuri, Babhnipatti, Parsa, Thalhi, Hanuman Nagar, and Durgapatti, etc.

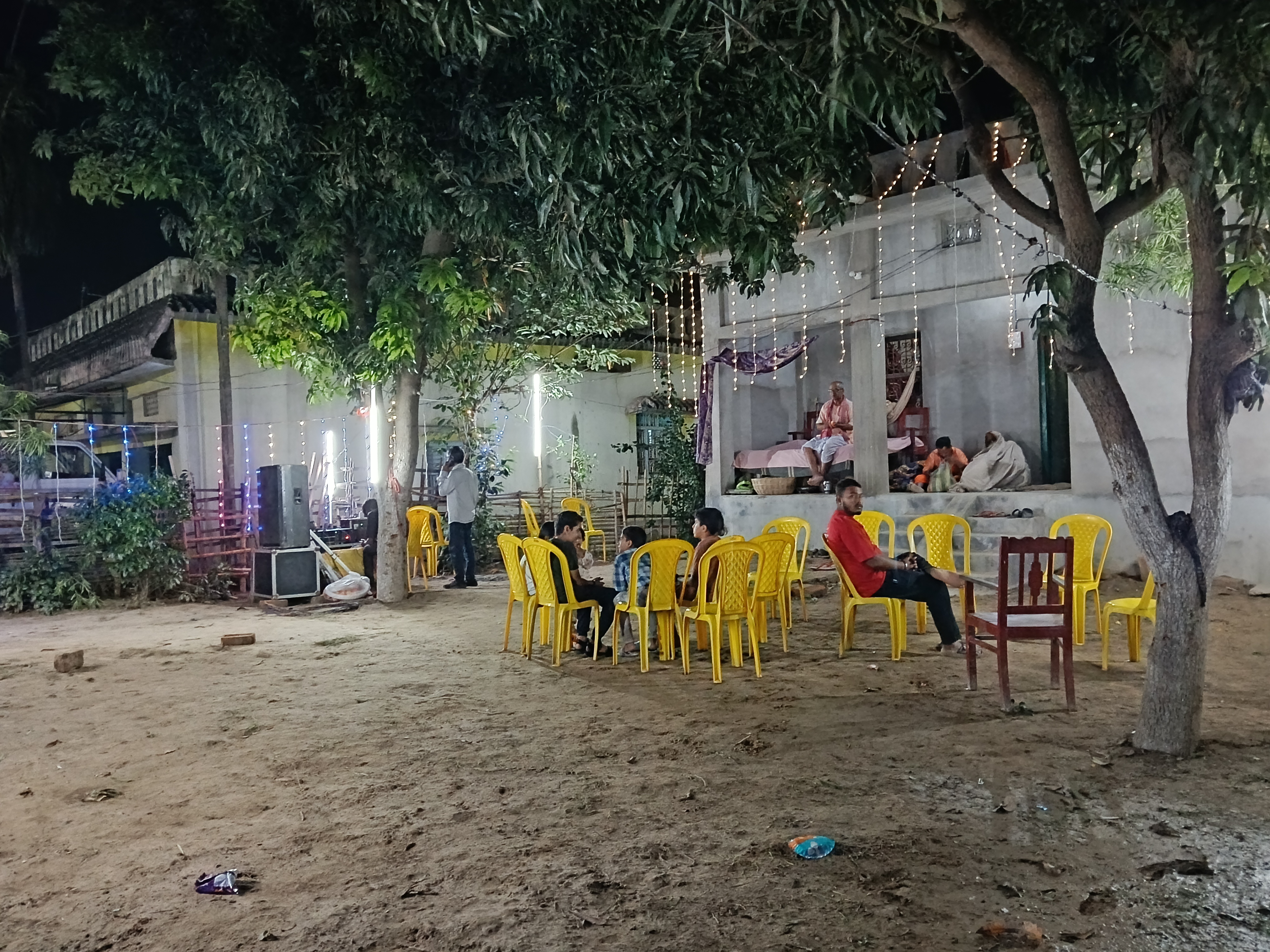
View of a residential house Laxman Garden at the Chaudhary Tol in the village.

== Educational institutions ==
In recorded history, the first school established in the village is Primary School Babhnipatti in 1931. This proves that in this village there was an educational institution before the Independence of India.

During the 20th century, Pandit Simheśvara Jhā was a scholar cum teacher of Vyākaraņa. Balabhodha Miśra of the Kokana village in the Sitamarhi district, came to learn elementary education of Vyākaraņa from the teacher Simheśvara Jhā at his home in Basuki Bihari. He was brought in the village of Basuki Bihari by his uncle Iśvarīdatta Miśra.

1. Utkramit Higher Secondary School, Bihari

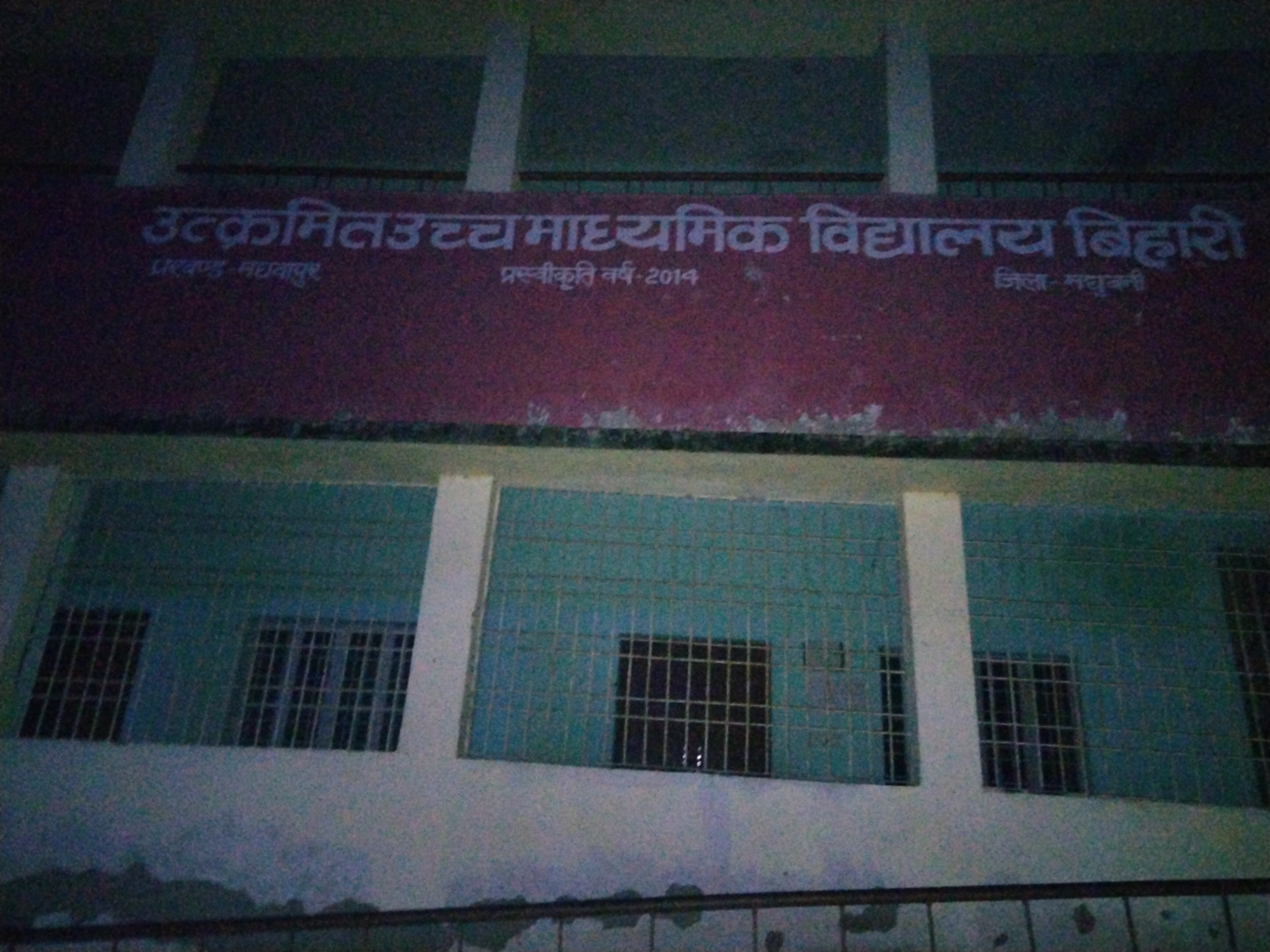
Utkramit Higher Secondary School, Bihari

1. Utkramit Middle School, Bihari
2. Primary School Babhnipatti, Basuki Bihari
3. Delhi Public School, Bihari
4. Prerna Academy, Basuki Bihari

== Social and cultural organisations ==
1. "Durga Puja Samiti, Bihari" is a social and cultural organisations to organise Durga Puja festival in the village. It was established in 1987 by the villagers of the village. During the period the Durga Puja festival, a grand procession of Belnati Beltodi is organised by the samiti on the Shashthi day of the festival. It is organised according to the Mithila tradition of Durga Puja.
2. "Kali Puja Samiti, Bihari" organises Kali Puja festival in the village in the month of October - November every year.
3. "Kamala Pooja" - Kamala Pujan is held at Brahmapuri Tol of the Basuki Bihari South Panchayat, with the aim of pleasing the water goddess Kamala Mai near the bank of the Dhouns River flowing through village. It is organised by the people of the Machhuara (fishermen) community for wishing protection of water resources, advancement in water related businesses like fish and makhana, family happiness, peace and prosperity. The rituals are performed according to the Tantrik Vidhi in Hinduism.
4. Ganesh Puja at Basuki Chowk - It is a grand annual festival celebration at the Basuki Chowk of the village dedicated to Lord Ganesha. It is organised at a temporary beautiful pandal constructed near the Durga Puja Mandir in the vicinity of the chowk. It is organised and managed by a Puja Samiti.
5. Shree Krishna Janmashtami - The festival of Shree Krishna Janmashtami in Hinduism, is celebrated with great pomp and show at different places in the village.
6. Durga Puja Bhavan, Basuki - On the side of Basuki-Saharghat highway near the Basuki Chowk of the village, there is a temple dedicated to Durga Puja. It is located at the premises of the Brahmasthan at the Basuki Tol. Every year a grand ceremony of Durga Puja is organised in temple, where a large number of devotees flock to pay salutations to the Goddess Durga.

== Gallery ==
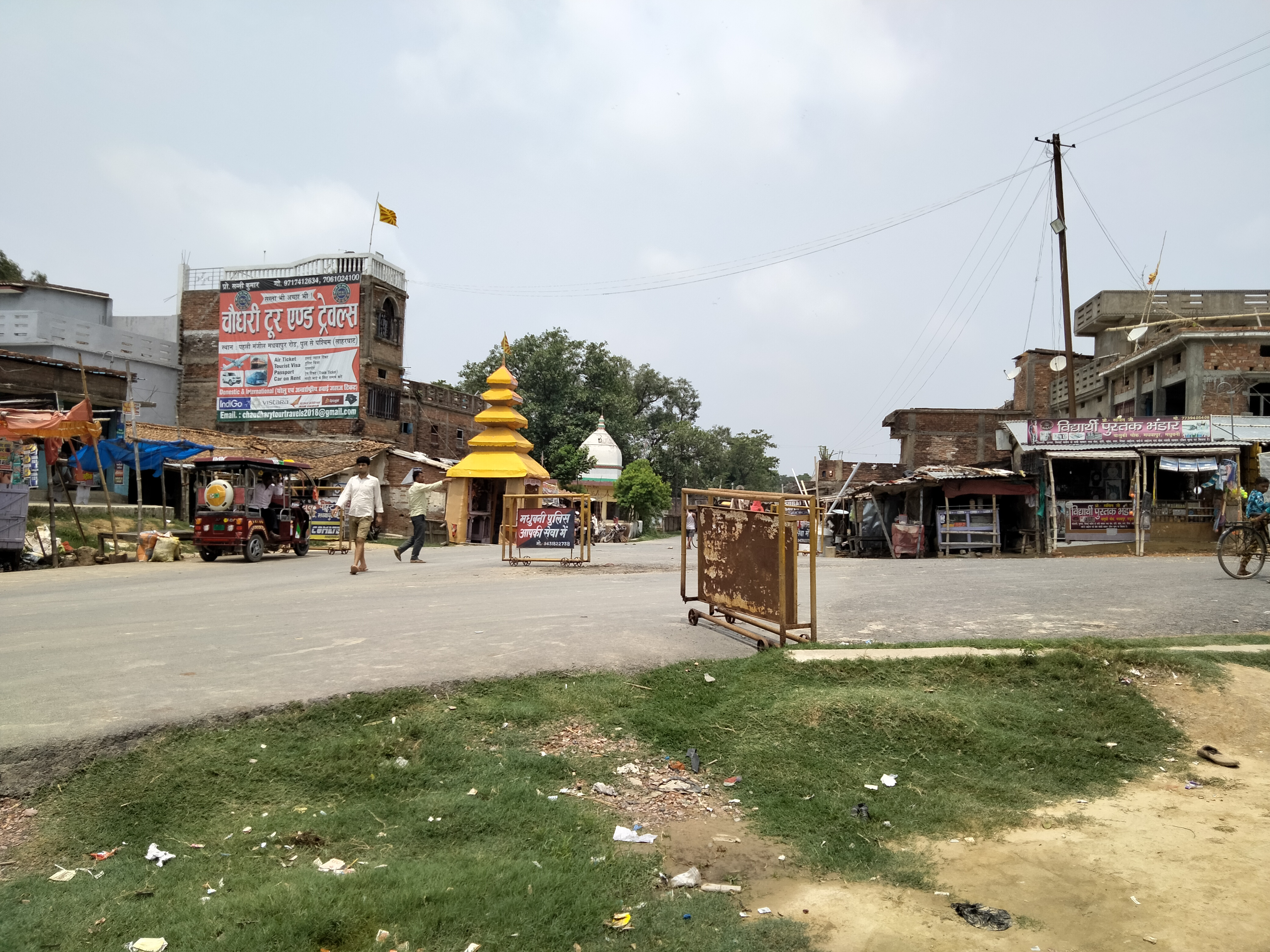
Basuki Chowk at Basuki Bihari South

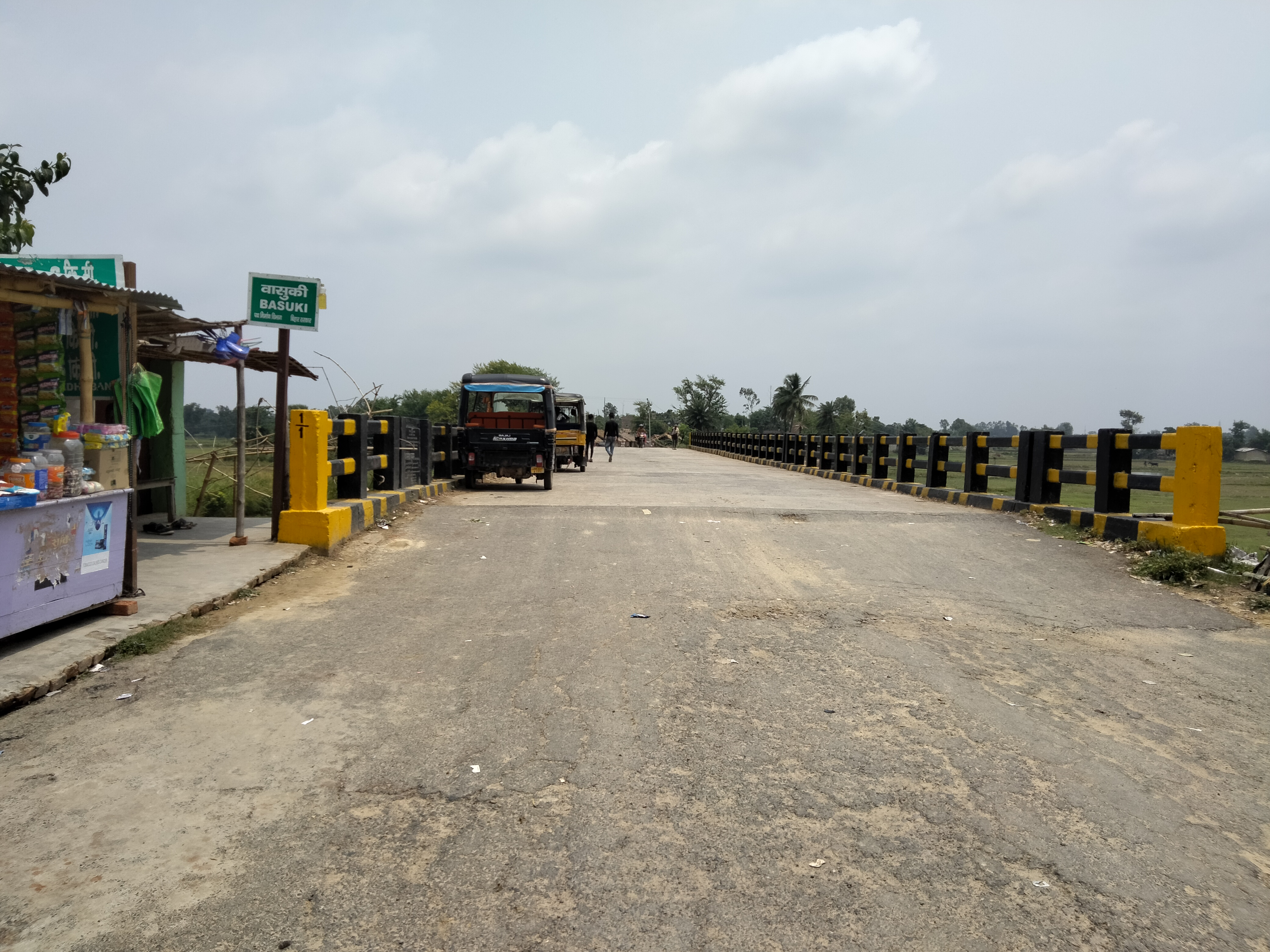
Basuki Bihari Bridge (बासुकी बिहारी पुल )

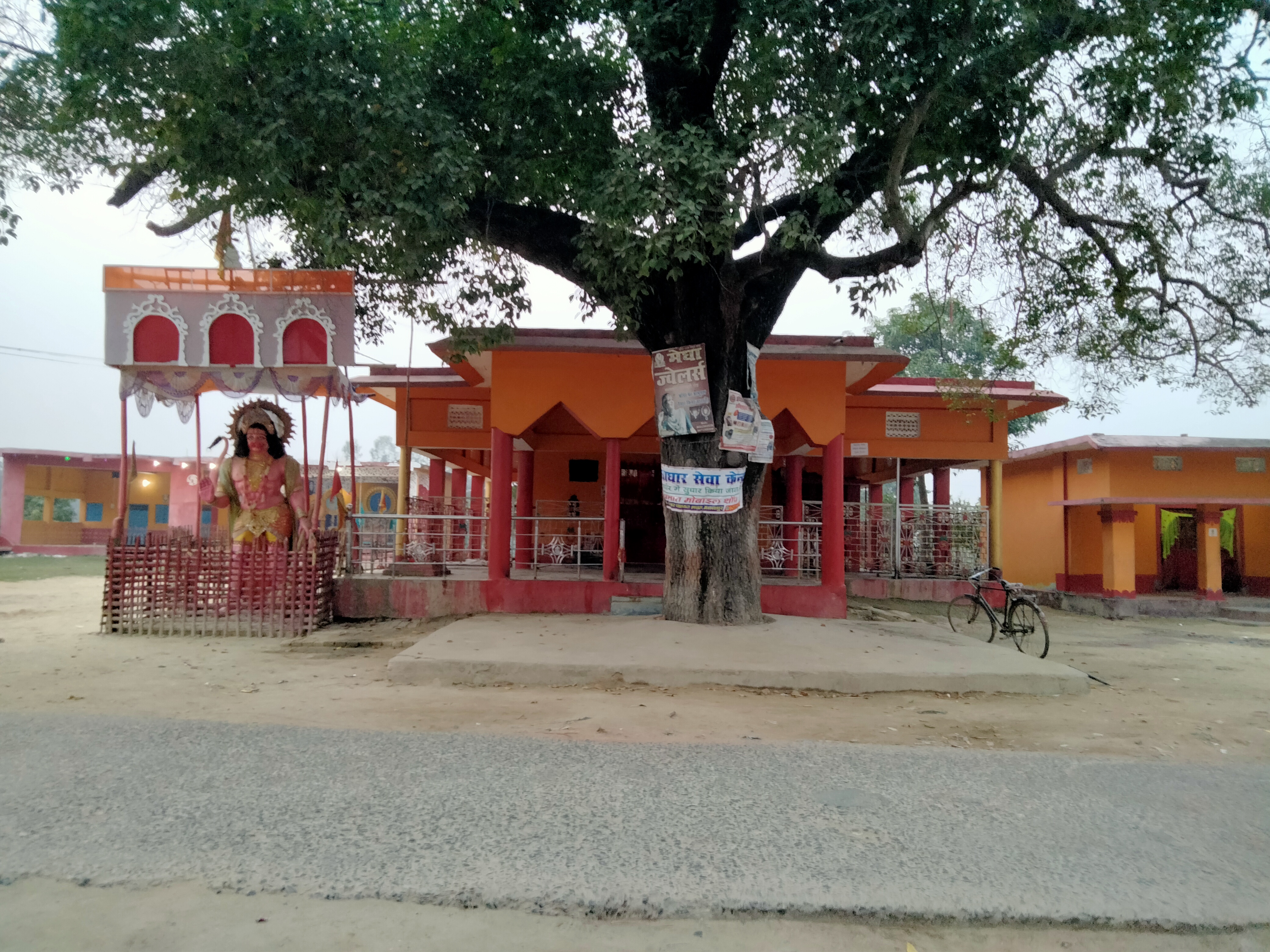
Maharani Sthan, Basuki Bihari North near Chaudhary Tol

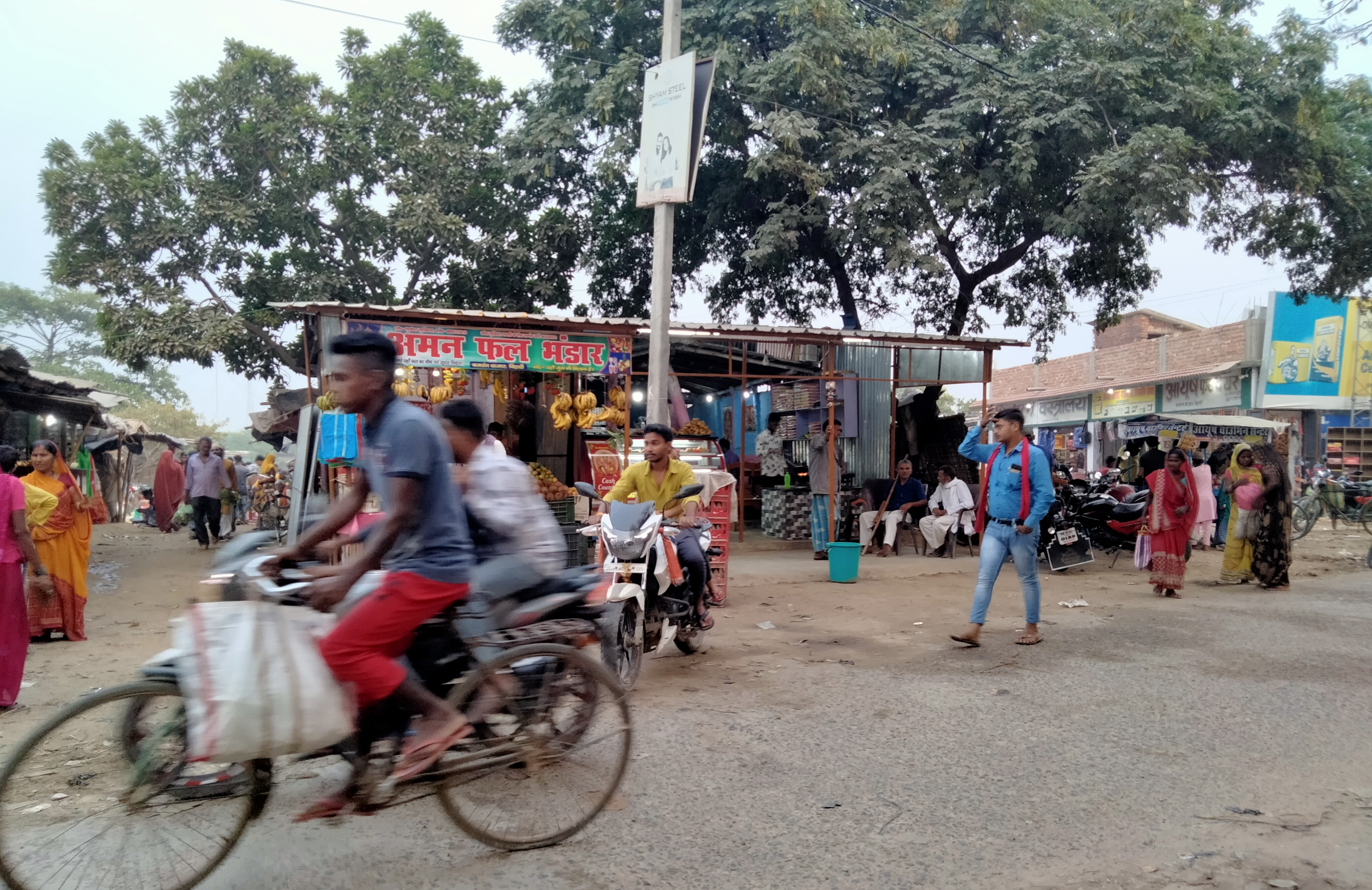
Bajarang Bazar, Basuki Bihari North near old Gram Panchayat

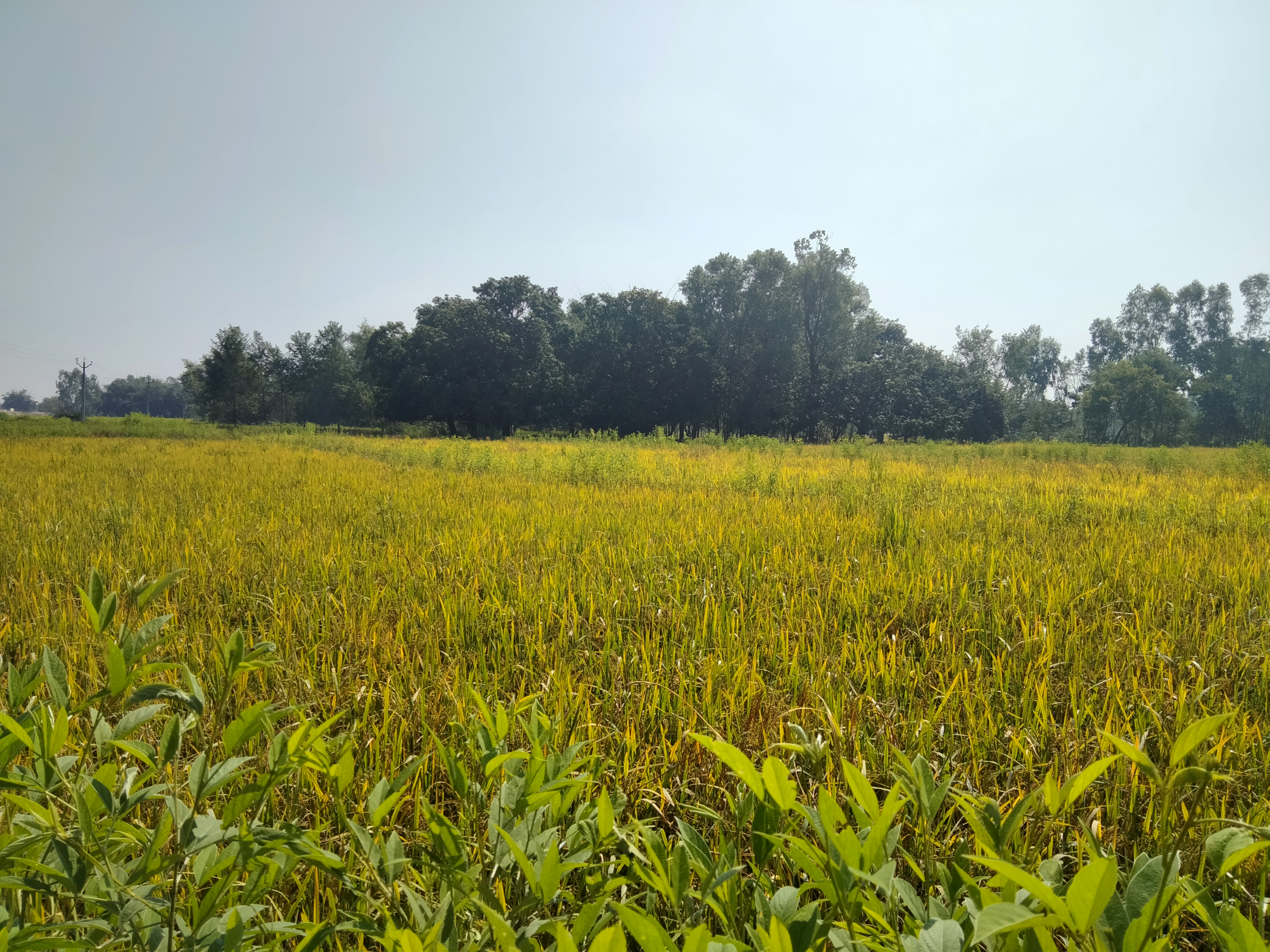
View of Puwari Baadh at Inrwa Tol in Basuki Bihari North

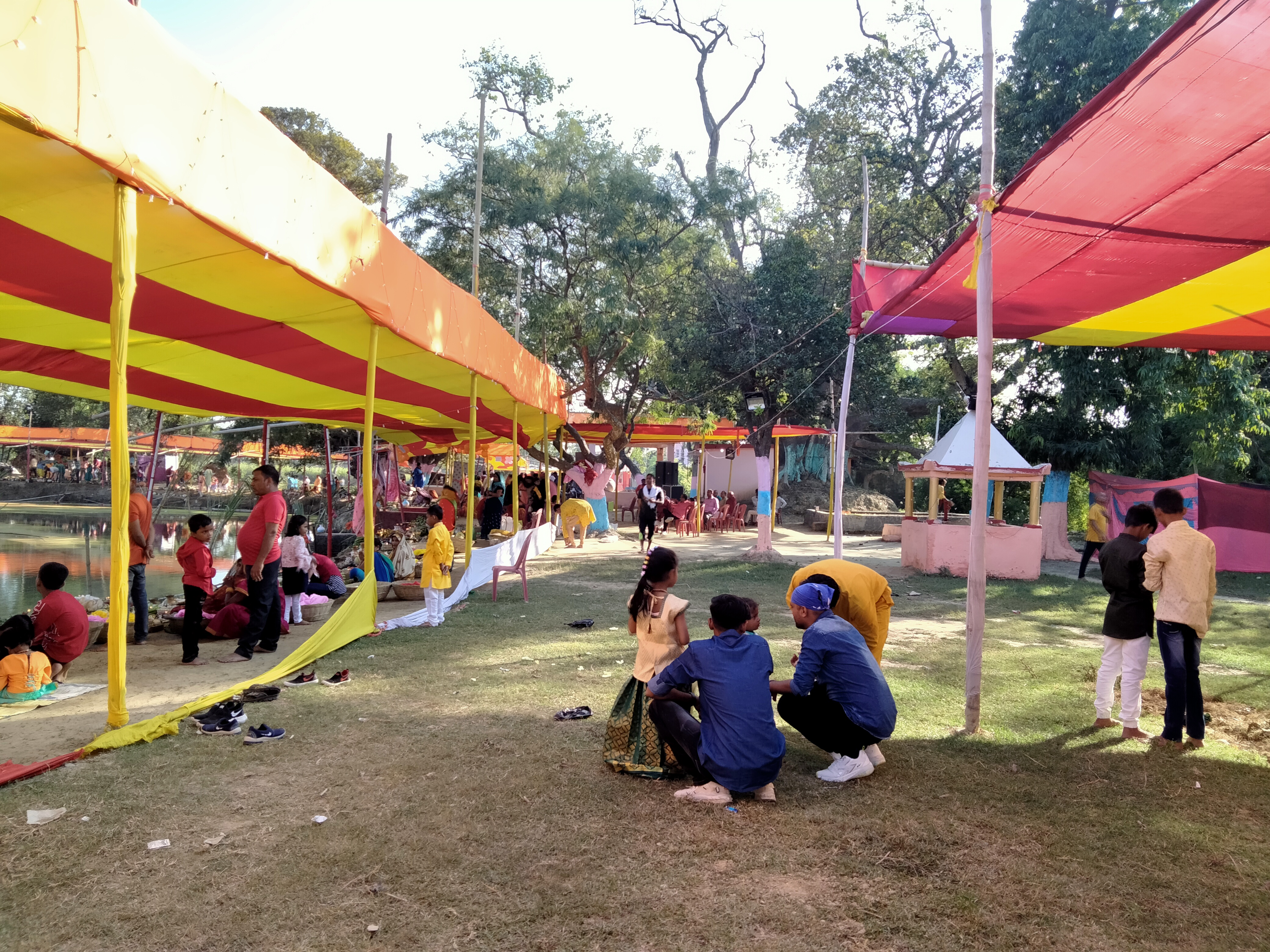
View during Chhath Puja at Chaudhary Pokhair Ghat, Basuki Nath Mahadev Mandir

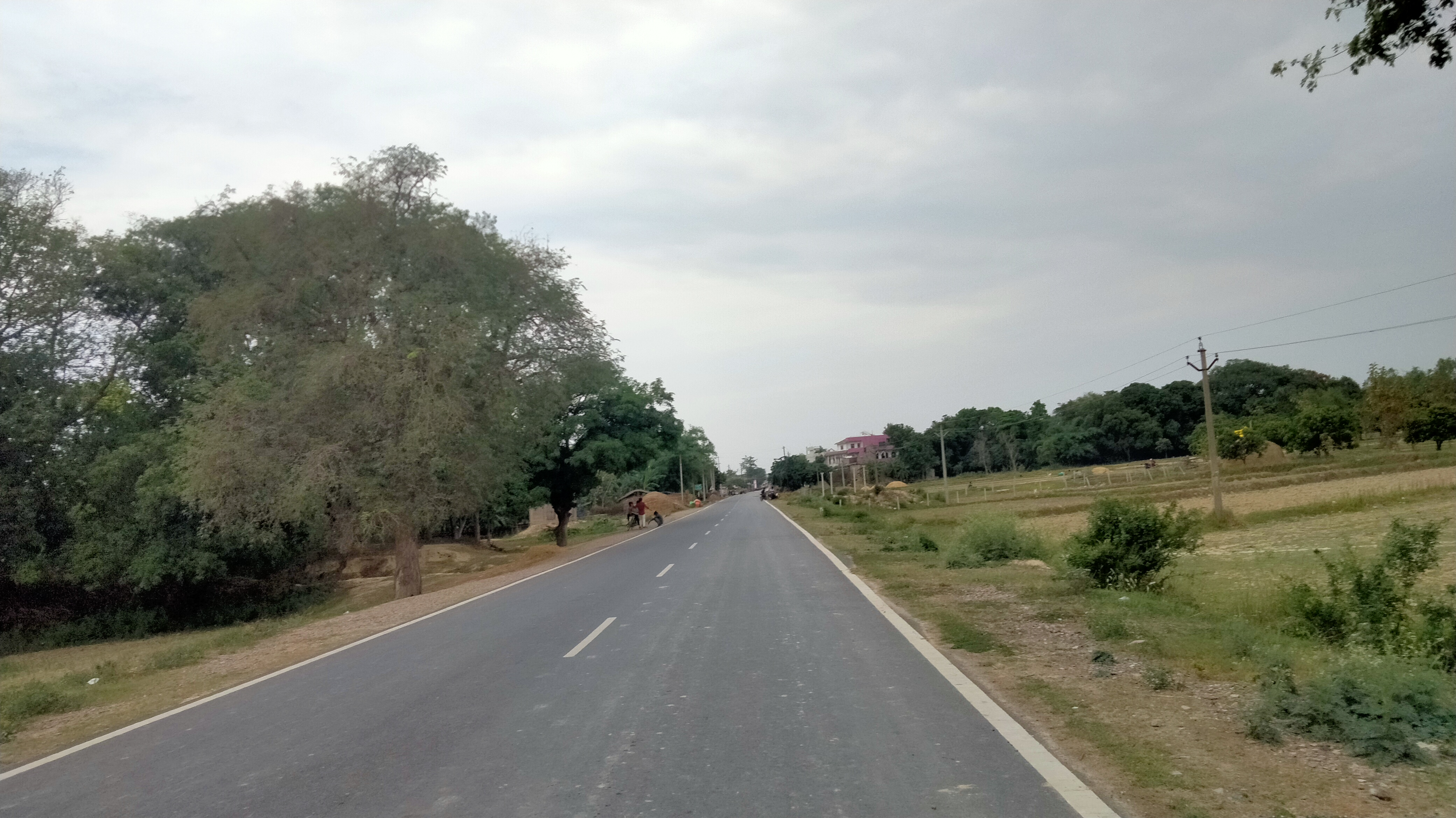
National Highway 227 passing through the village of Basuki Bihari South

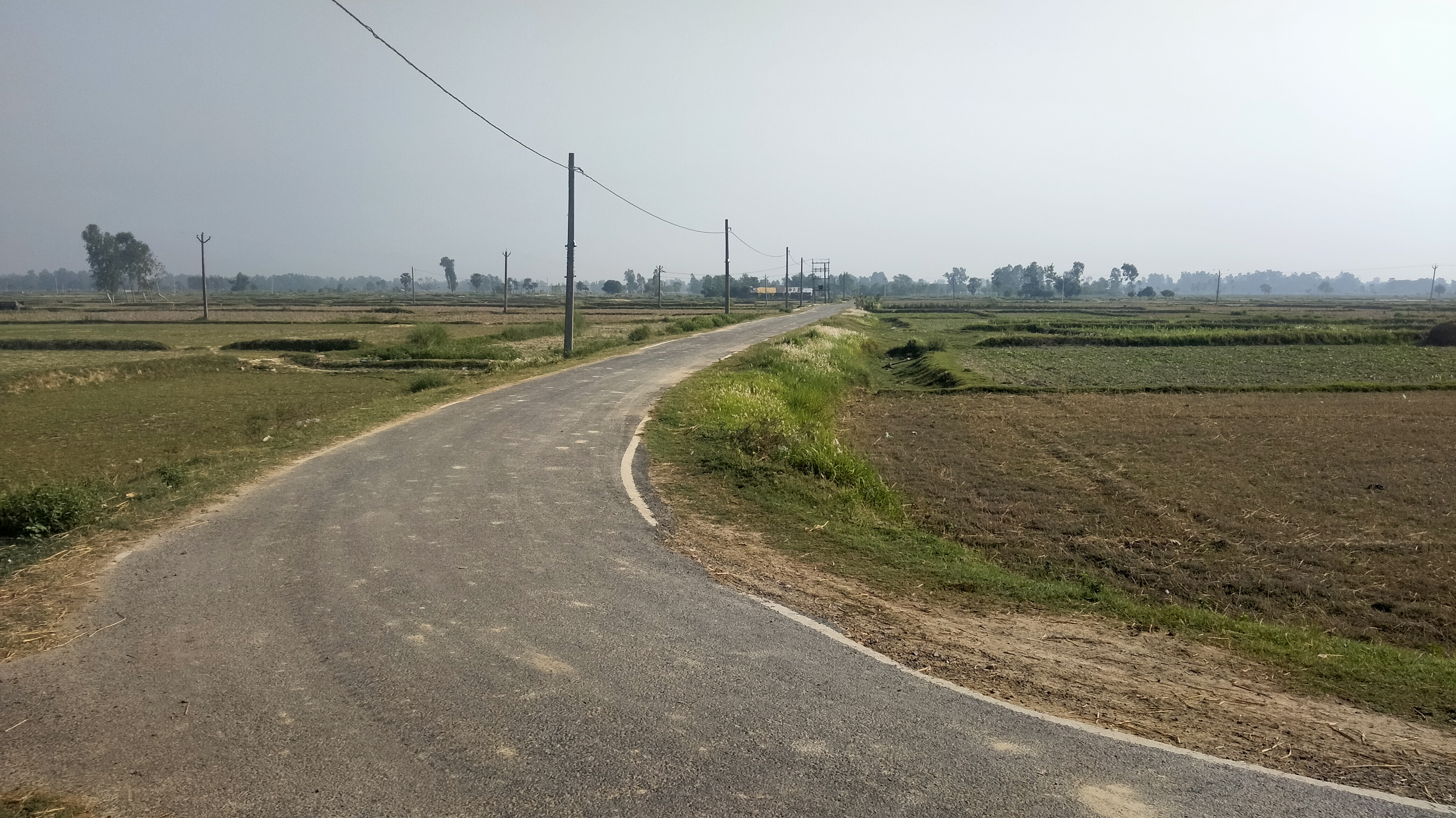
Inarwa Tol - Parsa Road, Basuki Bihari North

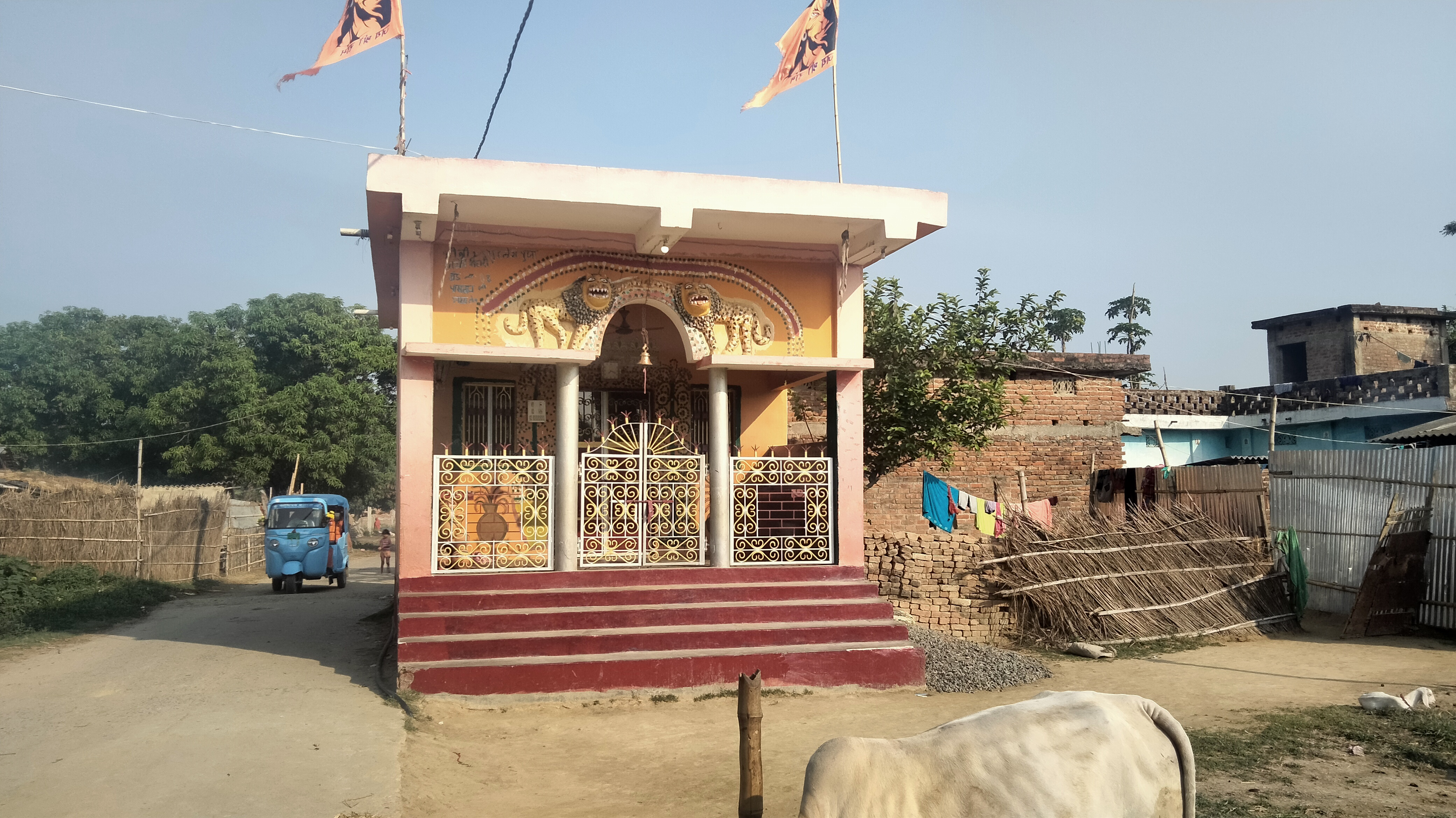
Salhesh Mandir at Inarwa Tol near Parsa Road, Basuki Bihari North

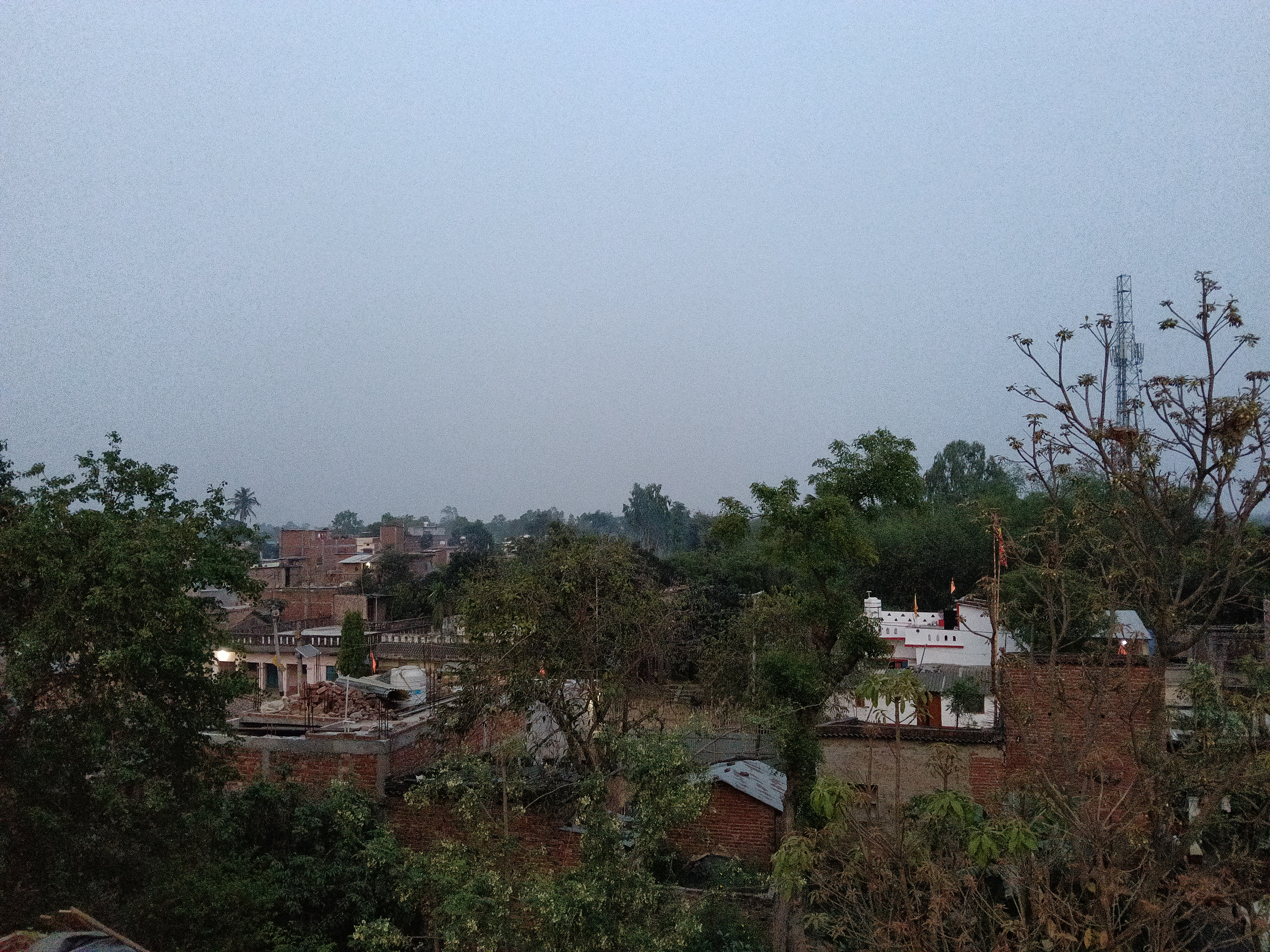
View of Chaudhary Tol from a terrace.

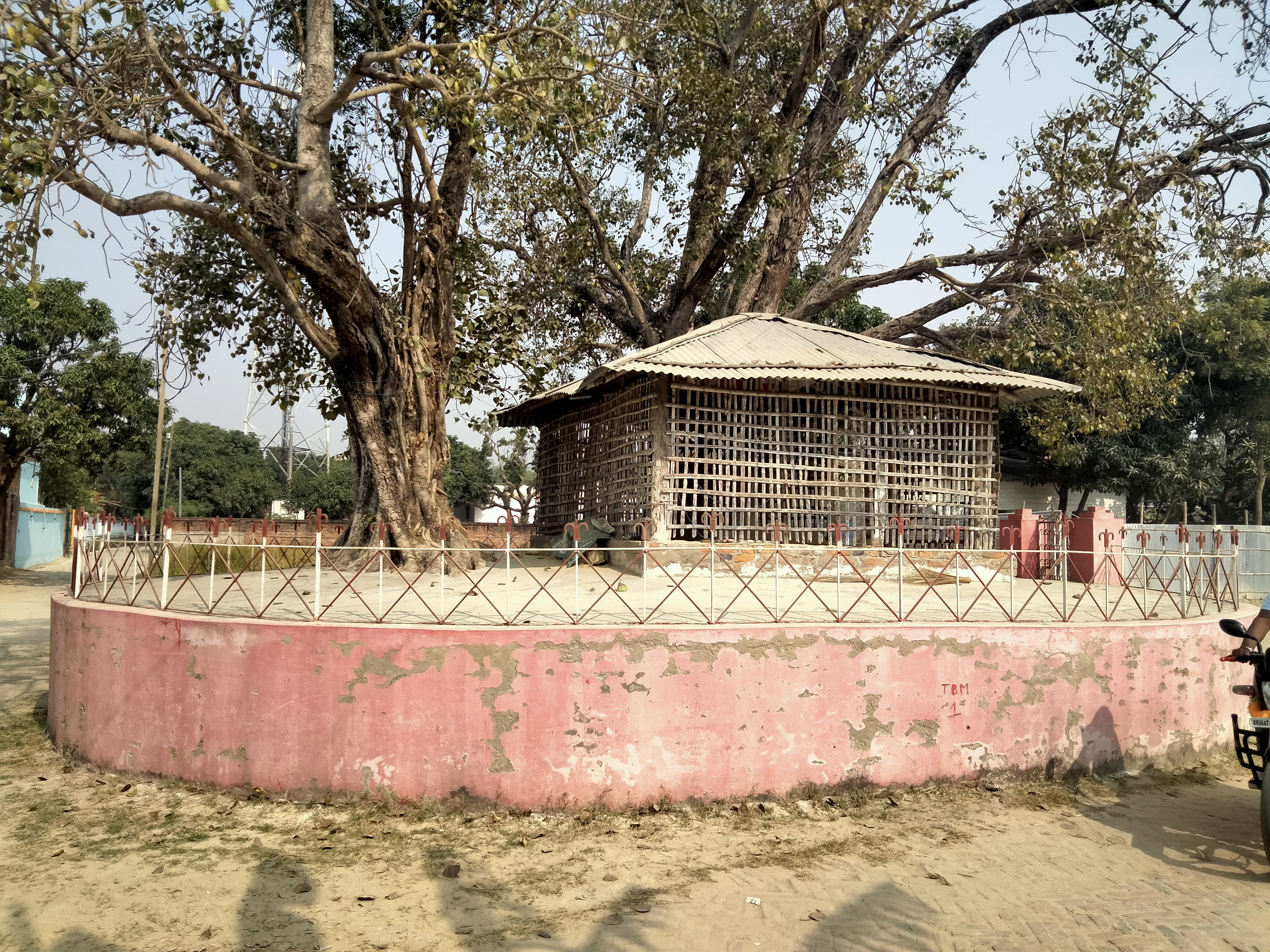
Sati Mai Sthan

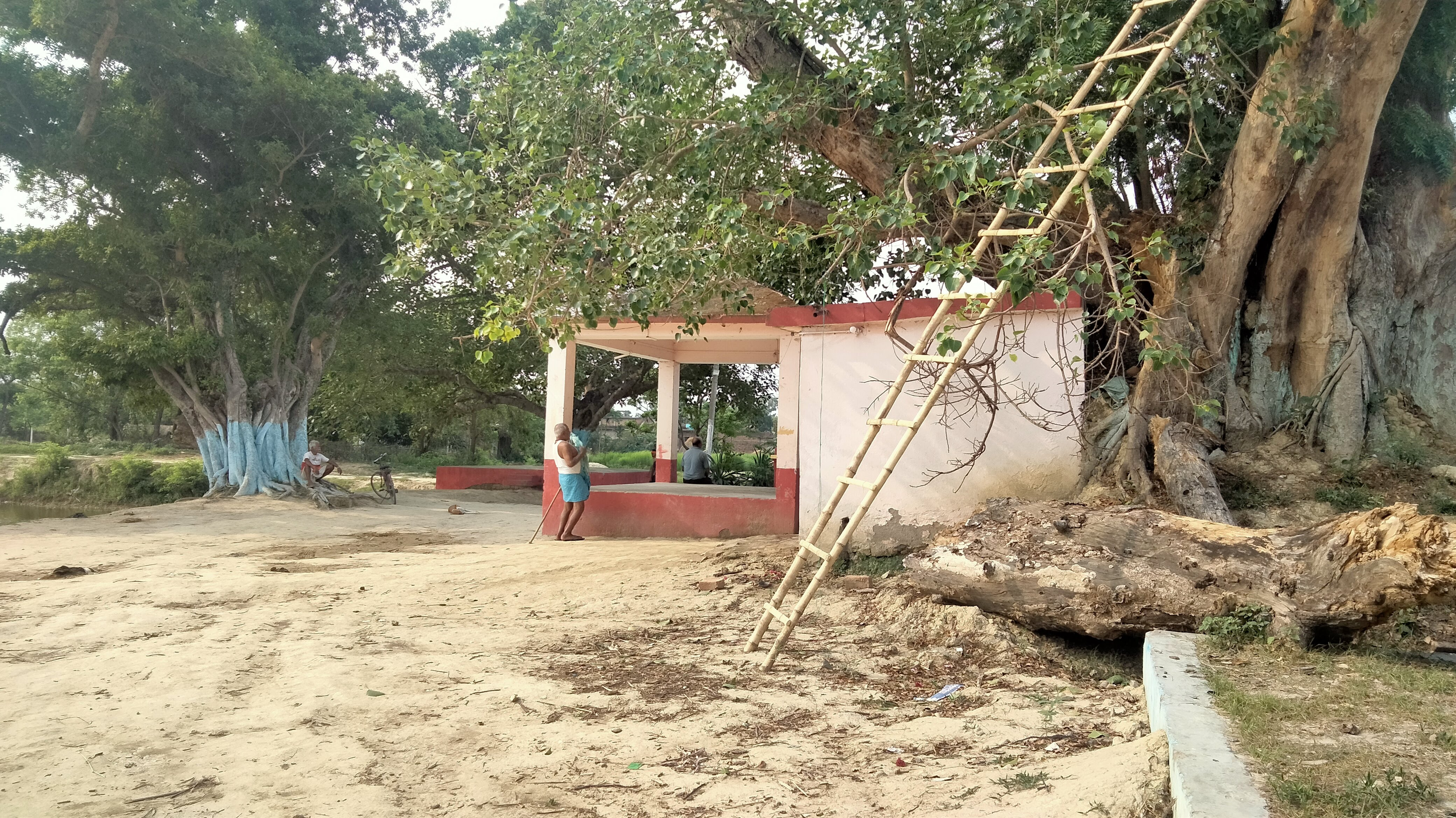
Brahma Sthan, Chaudhary Pokhair

Durga Puja Bhavan Mandir at Chaudhary Tol, Maharani Sthan.

== Economy ==
Before the early period of the 20th-century, the village was one of the seven frontier trade registration stations in the older Darbhanga district. On 1 March 1904, the frontier trade registration station was removed from the village and shifted to the village of Madhwapur. Around 1978, the village holds a rice mill called Umesh Floor and Rice Mill. In the village, there is a branch of nationalised bank called Bank of India to fulfill the banking requirements of the villagers, economic activities of the village and its surrounding villages. The IFSC Code of the branch of the Bank of India is BKID0004541. At the ground floor of bank's branch, there is facility of ATM machine service of the Bank of India, but often there is cash shortage in the machine. The location in the village, where the branch of the bank is located is locally called as Bank Chowk. It situated on the side of the Darbhanga - Madhwapur state highway 75.

Apart from the facility of the nationalised banking services in the village for economic activities, there are three major market areas, where the major economic activities in the village are carried out. These major market areas are Basuki More in the south corner, Bihari Bazar or Bajarang Bazar in the middle and Durga Mandir Bazar in the North area.

The village of Basuki Bihari is surrounded by the four major commercial hubs Madhwapur - Matihani in the north side, Saharghat in East-south, Charaut in South and Bhitthamore in West, in the region.

== See also ==
- Anariye Pirapur
