= Mithila Bambai Aam =

Special Mango in Mithila

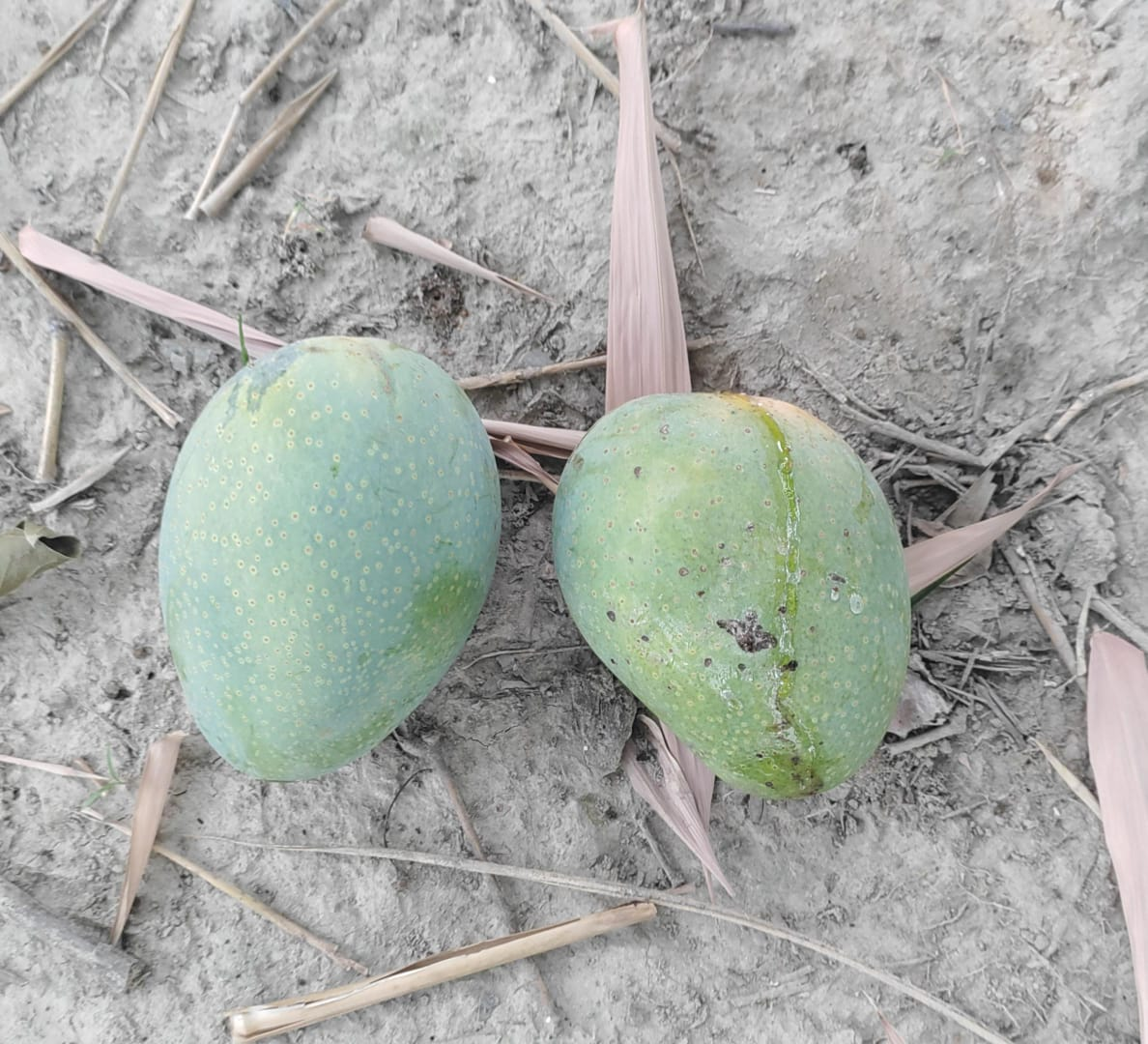
Nazra or Nejra Bambai Aam

Mithila Bambai Aam (Mithila's Bombay Mango) or Bambaiya is a mango variation recognized by its unique sweetness and memorable smell compared to other types of mangoes cultivated in the Mithila region of Bihar and Nepal. It contains plenty of both pulp and juice. It is more fruitful in Mithila. The ideal season to produce Mithila Bambai Aam is early summer, as it is regularly at its ripest in June, notwithstanding infrequencies.

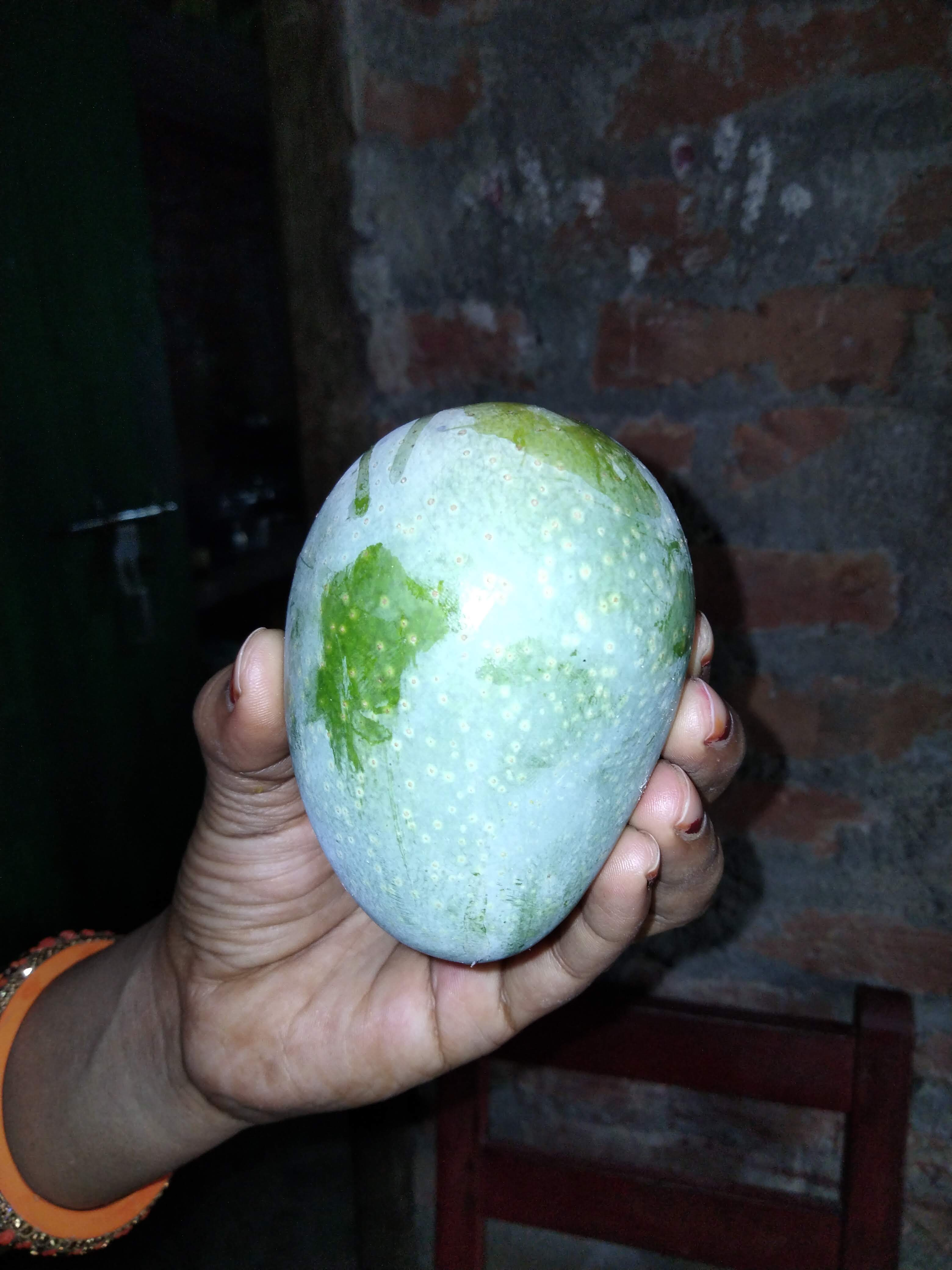
Image of a Bambai mango picked from the Laxman Garden at Basuki Bihari village in Madhubani district.

== Description ==
On ripening of the mango, the area near the stalk becomes slightly yellow and the rest of the part remains green. So this mango is also known as Bambai Hara for its green colour. There many small white dot spots on the peel of the mango. The fruit is medium in size having weight 150 grams to 200 grams, the pulp is solid without fiber with medium sweetness and intense aroma. The Bambai Aam begins to ripen from the month of May.

In the region of Mithila, the Sitamarhi district is majorly known for the cultivation of Bambai mango. In the recent years, demands of the Mithila's Bambai mangoes, in the other states of the country have been rapidly grown.

== Types ==
There are mainly three varieties of the mango. They are Doma Bambai, Nejra Bambai and Sabja Bambai. There are three more varieties Mandhanzhak Bambai, Ujri Bambai or Kharadakh and Sauda Bambai.

In the recent years, a new variety of the Bambai mango has been developed. It is cultivated in the region of the Muzaffarpur and Darbhanga districts. The colour of the mango is red from its early stage. Due to the virtue of its colour, it is called as Bambaiya Lalbahar. It is an expensive mango compared to other varieties of mangoes.
