= Pipraun =

Border village in Mithila, Bihar, India

- Village
- Interactive map of Pipraun
- Coordinates: 26.6010487°N 85.9363222°E
- Country: India
- State: Bihar
- Region: Mithila
- District: Madhubani
- Block: Harlakhi

Population (2011)
  - Total: 9,249
- Demonym: Maithil

Languages
  - Official language: Mother language: Hindi; Maithili

Pipraun is a village in the Harlakhi block of the Madhubani district in the Mithila region of Bihar in India. It is situated near the India–Nepal border. The international border is called as Pipraun-Jatahi border. There is an Indian custom office in the village.

== Demographics ==
According to the population census 2011, the total population of the village is 9249. Out of the total population, 4803 are males and 4446 are females. The total number of households in the village is 1641.

== Description ==
The legendary river Jamuni flows through the northern side of the village. The Jamuni river also serves as the line of Indo-Nepal border near the village. The border at the Pipraun village connects two major Hindu religious destinations Janakpur and Phulhar in the Mithila region related to the Ramayana circuit. During the festival of Mithila Madhya Parikrama, devotees and travellers pass through the village while their journey between the legendary sites of the Kalyaneshwar Mahadev Mandir at the Kalna village and Baag Taraag Pushpavatika at the Phulhar village. The village is connected by the National Highway-227 from Chakia to Narahia. In the village, there is a petrol pump on the side of the national highway. The nearby villages are Durgapatti and Sothgaon, etc.

The Government of India has deployed a camp of SSB soldiers near the line of the Indo-Nepal border in the village for the purpose of border security. On the north side of the border, there is a Nepalese village called Jatahi. The Jatahi village is connected to the capital city Janakpur of the Madhesh Pradesh province in Nepal by a highway.
