= Jamuni River =

River flowing in Mithila

Jamuni River जमुनी नदी

Location
- Country: India and Nepal
- State: Bihar (India) and Madhesh Pradesh (Nepal)
- Region: Mithila region
- District: Madhubani, Mahottari and Dhanusha

Basin features
- River system: Adhwara
- Landmarks: Jamuni Sangam, Akharharghat

Jamuni river (Maithili: जमुनी नदी) is a river that flows on the plains of the Mithila region in the Indian subcontinent. It is the part of Adhwara group of rivers flowing through western part of the Madhubani district. It is a perennial river that originates in the Himalayan range of Nepal and merges with Dhouns river at Akharharghat in the Indian states of Bihar.

== Description ==
According to legend, it is one of the ancient rivers in the Mithila region that is still existing. It is said that the existence of the river can be traced from the legends of Ramayana. It also defines the international border line between India and Nepal in some parts the Mithila region of the Indian Subcontinent.

The river passes through the Mithila region of Nepal and flows through the border area of Haranian, Mahadevpatti, Umgaon, Pipraun, Rajghat, Dighiya, Bela Ghat, and merges at Akharharghat in the Dhouns river.
