= Akharharghat =

Village in Bihar

Akharharghat Jamuni Sangam Ghat
- Village
- Nickname: Jamuni Mela
- Interactive map of Akharharghat
- Coordinates: 26.5682666°N 85.8492068°E
- Country: India
- State: Bihar
- Region: Mithila
- District: Madhubani
- Block: Madhwapur
- Seat: Panchayat

Government
  - Type: Mukhiya
  - Body: Gram panchayat
  - Mukhiya: Ramnaresh Prasad

Population
  - Total: 1,200
- Demonym: Maithil

Language
  - Official: Hindi

Language
  - Mother language: Maithili

Shree Shree 108 Trilokinath Mahadev Mandir
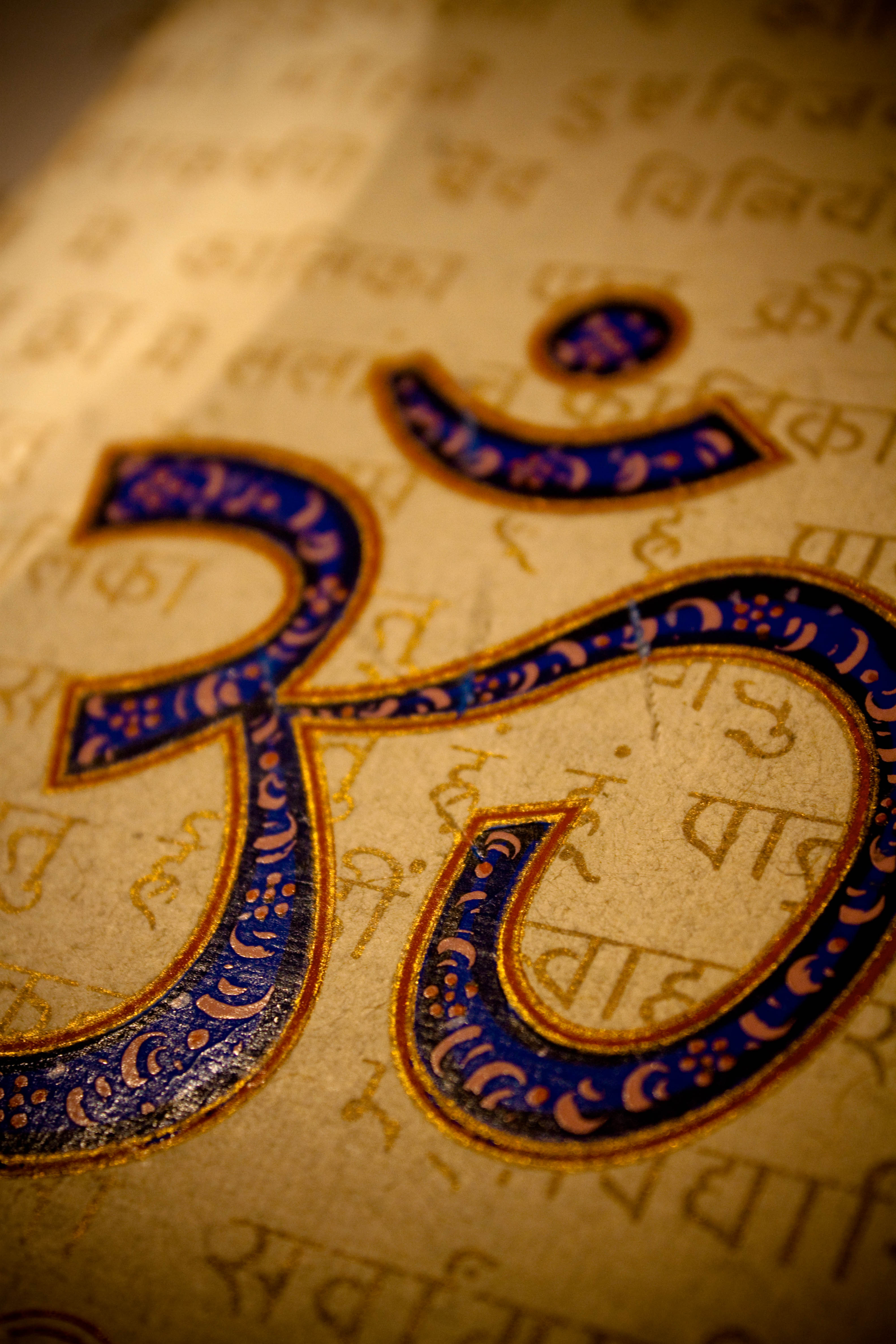

Religion
- Affiliation: Hinduism
- District: Madhubani district
- Deity: Shiva
- Festivals: Makar Sankranti, Bhai Dooj, Jamuni Sangam Mela

Location
- Location: Mithila region
- State: Bihar
- Country: India

Akharharghat is a village and a local tourist place located at Sahar North panchayat in Mithila region of Madhubani district in Bihar. The village is situated on the bank of three local rivers Dhauns, Yamuni and Bhiggi. There is a junction of these river streams. The junction of these river streams is a religious place for the local Hindu pilgrimage called as Jamuni Sangam. Hindu pilgrimage took bath in the holy water at the Jamuni Sangam on the festival Makarsankranti and Bhai Duj. There is a Hindu temple of Lord Shiva known as Shree Trilokinath Mahadev Mandir. The temple is known for organising a locally famous fair known as Jamuni Mela. Akharharghat is also an Indo-Nepal border which covers three kilometer border from pillar number 830 to 93 in Brahmapuri village. Nepali APF, SSB, Thana Police Force have joint regular patrolling along the Indo-Nepal border. The village is on the trial of the International border line between India and Nepal. This village turns into an island in raining seasons. The village is connected to the Indo-Nepal border connecting road National Highway number 104 by an approach road at the Saharghat village of Madhwapur block. The village is only 3 km distance from the headquarter of the Madhwapur block in Madhubani district of Bihar. There is a destroyed wooden bridge in the village built during the British rule to connect the village with the nearest market village Saharghat. Local BJP leader and MLC Ghanshyam Thakur raised the issue of the destroyed wood bridge in the session of Legislative Council of Bihar state in India.

== Demographics ==
The population of this village is a little over 1200. This is a completely scheduled caste and most backward caste dominated village. Major people of the village are fishermen and boatmen.

== Legendary folklore ==
According to the Legends, the formal celebration of the festival fair Jamuni Mela at the lord Shiva temple Shree Trilokinath Mahadev Mandir near the Jamuni Sangam started since 1915 AD. According to the local Legendary mythology, Yamuni was the sister of the lord Yamraj. It is said that once she wished with his brother Yamraj, that one who takes bath at the Jamuni Sangam of the holy river Yamuni on the third day after the Diwali festival would become free from the fear of the death from the Lord Yamraj. The third day after the Diwali festival is also celebrated as Bhai Duj in the Mithila region between brothers and sisters mutually for the wishes of long age of each other.
