= Ram Baraat Yatra =

Annual procession of Lord Rama arriving in Janakpur

Ram Baraat Yatra (Maithili: राम बरात यात्रा) is an annual Hindu pilgrimage ("Ram Baraat") from Ayodhya, Uttar Pradesh to the city of Janakpur in the Mithila region of Nepal. The pilgrimage celebrates the marriage of the divine couple Rama and Sita. Observers gather in Janakpur one or two days prior to the Vivah Panchami Day. The arrival of the procession in Janakpur carries the legacy of the legendary Ram Baraat, which arrived in Ramayana on the occasion of Rama and Sita's marriage. It is primarily organised by the Vishwa Hindu Parishad.

On the occasion of the Vivah Panchami festival in Janakpur, a grand ceremony known as the Shri Sitaram Vivah Mahotsav (Shri Sitaram Marriage Festival) is held there. The Ram Baraat arrived in the city participate in the grand ceremony as marriage procession. Apart from the city of Ayodhya, some processions of Ram Baraat also come from other cities or places in India to the city of Janakpur in Nepal. The legacy of the legendary Ram Baraat Yatra is preserved as an episode of the Ramlila drama played at several locations in the subcontinent on different festivals.
