= Rajarshi Janak Mandir =

Temple dedicated to King Janaka in Mithila

Coordinates: 26°43′45″N 85°55′41″E

Shree Rajarshi Janak Mandir
- श्री राजर्षी जनक मंदिर
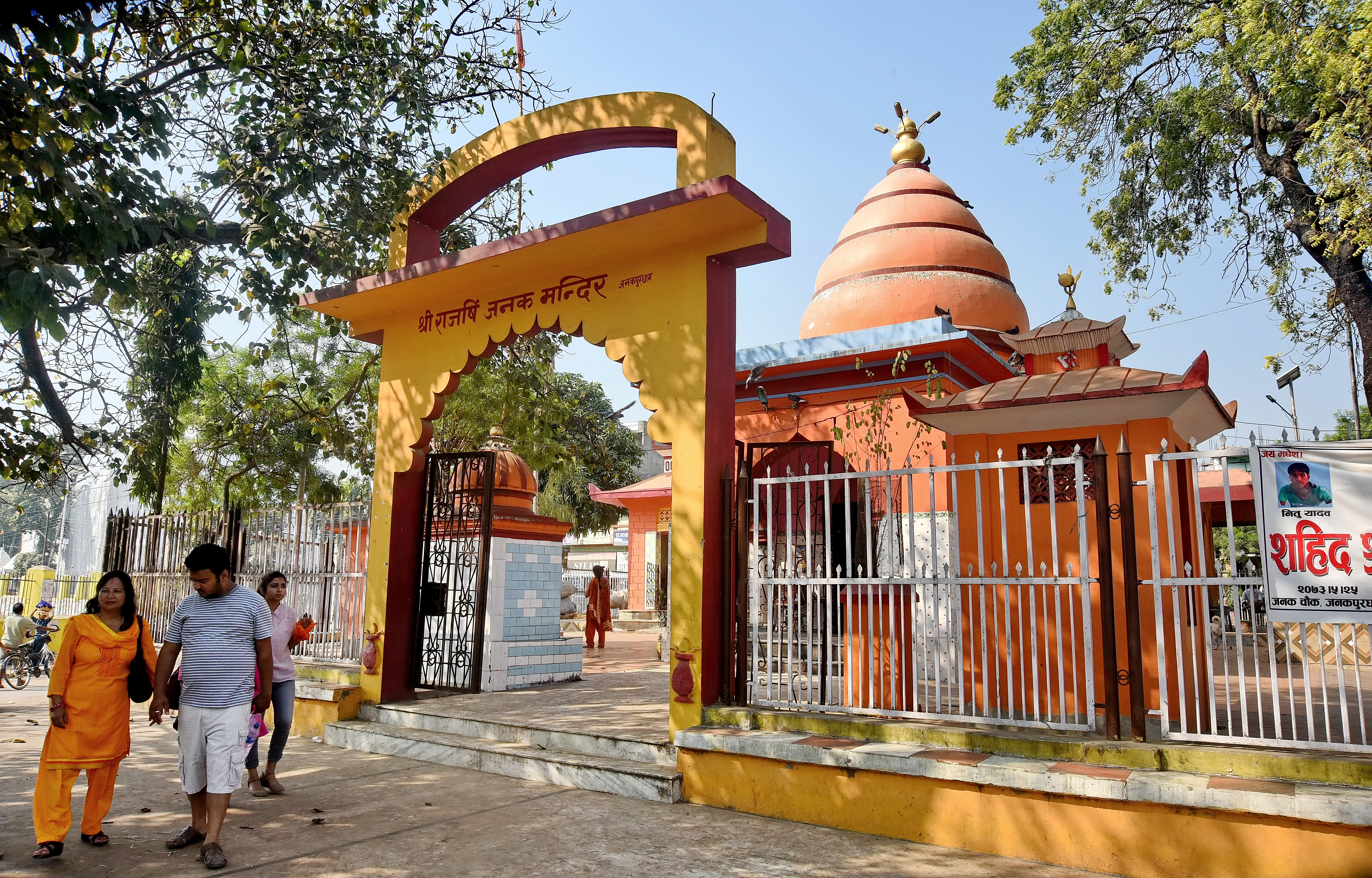
- View of Shree Rajarshi Janak Mandir in Janakpur

Religion
- Affiliation: Hinduism
- District: Dhanusha district
- Province: Madhesh Pradesh
- Deity: Janaka

Location
- Location: Mithila region
- Country: Nepal
- Interactive map of Shree Rajarshi Janak Mandir
- Temple dedicated to King Janaka

Rajarshi Janak Mandir (Maithili: राजर्षी जनक मंदिर) is a Hindu temple in the city of Janakpur in the Mithila region of Nepal. It is dedicated to the Vedic King Janaka of the ancient Videha Kingdom. The location of the temple is known as Janak Chowk in the city of Janakpur.

== Description ==
The city of Janakpur in the Mithila region of Nepal is named after the King Janaka. In the city, there are several Hindu temples dedicated to the Hindu deities related to the Indian text Ramayana. The temple dedicated to the King Janaka is located at the Janak Chowk in the city. It is known as Shree Rajarshi Janak Mandir or simply called as Janak Mandir. It is situated near the holy pond Dhanushsagar and Ram Mandir in the city. The location of temple is tentative to be mapped in the proposed area of the World Heritage Site in the city of Janakpur in Nepal.

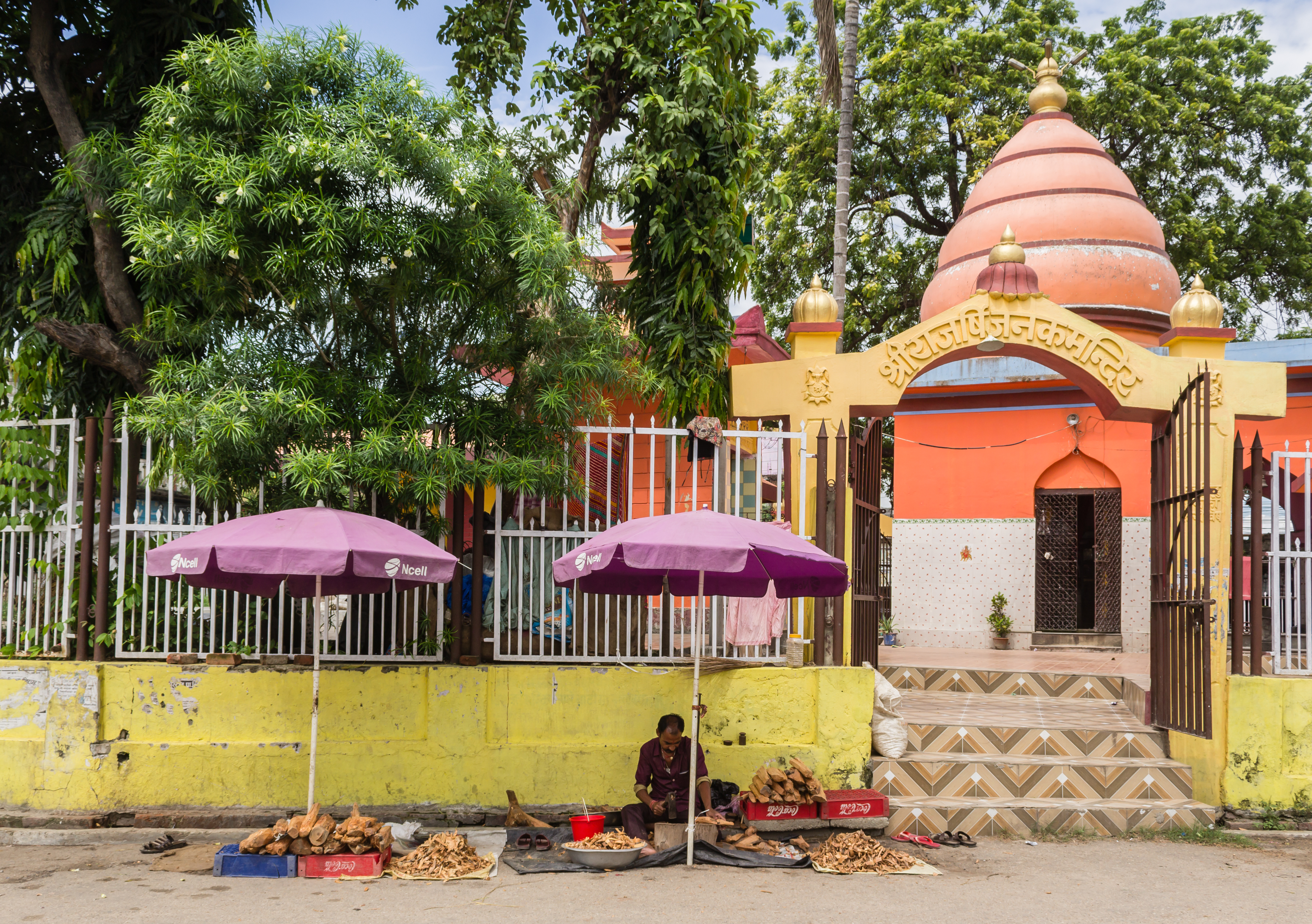
Shree Rajarshi Janak Mandir at Janak Chowk in Janakpur city of Nepal

== See also ==
- Girija Sthan
