= Janak Chowk =

Legendary landmark in Janakpur.

The Janak Chowk ( Maithili: जनक चौक ) in the city of Janakpur is a legendary landmark attributed to the King Janaka of Mithila. It is located near the Dhanushasagar pond in the vicinity of the historical temple called Ram Mandir. Presently it is a prime location in the city of Janakpur in Nepal. It is a major commercial hub in the city.

View of the Janak Chowk in Janakpur (2016)

== Description ==
The Janak Chowk in the city is a major religious site of the Madhesh Pradesh province in Nepal. It is a destination of Hindu pilgrimage related to the Ramayana circuit in the Indian subcontinent. The vicinity of the site is regularly taken care by the home minister of the provincial government in Madhesh Pradesh. At the centre in the vicinity of the landmark, there is a legendary temple called Rajarshi Janak Mandir dedicated to the Vedic King Janaka of the ancient Mithila Kingdom.
