= Geruka Snaan Mela =

Sacred bathing fair in Mithila

Geruka Snaan Mela गेरुका स्नान मेला
- Nickname: Geruka Mela; Geruka Mahakumbha Mela
- Genre: Sacred bathing fair
- Frequency: triennial
- Venue: Confluence of Geruka and Bigghi rivers
- Locations: Confluence of Kantawan and Uttarvahini rivers
- Country: Nepal
- Years active: Treta Yuga
- Hindu adherents: Lakhs
- Organiser: Geruka Mela organising committees
- Sacred bathing fair associated with the epic Ramayana in the Mithila region.

Geruka Snaan Mela (Maithili: गेरुका स्नान मेला) also known as Geruka Mahakumbha Mela is a month-long Hindu religious fair held on the bank of Geruka river located at Khuttapiparadhi village of Loharpatti Rural Municipality in the Mithila region of Nepal. It is also held at some other locations in the region like Khairbani village of the Sonma Rural Municipality in the Mahottari district.

The devotees participating in the fair bathe in the river and perform worship at the shrines on the river banks. The fair of the Geruka Snaan Mela is considered as a symbol of the civilisation in the Mithila region and its cultural identity.

== Description ==
In the fair at Khuttapiparadhi, idols of Lord Rama and Goddess Sita are taken to the Geruka River under the aegis of the Janaki Mandir in Janakpur and these idols of the deities are worshipped there. Lakhs of devotees from the Mithila region of Nepal and India participate in the fair. The religious fair is organised at the confluence of the two rivers Geruka and Bigghi. The confluence is locally called as Geruka-Bigghi Sangam.

=== Shahi Snaan ===
On the opening day of the fair, a grand Shahi Snaan is conducted in the river. On the occasion of the Shahi Snaan (royal bath), a grand procession of Shobha Yatra led by the Mahant Ramtapeshwar Das Vaishnav of the Janaki Mandir, along with a decorated chariot from the city of Janakpur, reaches at the Geruka-Bigghi Sangam in morning. During the Shahi Snaan, a group of monks and saints from different Mathas (monasteries) and temples from the city of Janakpur, come to the Geruka Mela with a jhaki (a type of float). There is a Hindu shrine known as Shree Gerukadham at the confluence of the two rivers. The shrine holds several temples. These are Geruka Mai Mandir, Ramjanaki Mandir, and Mahadev Mandir, etc. During the festival, these temples are richly decorated. The Geruka river merges in the Bigghi river at the confluence.

Similarly, the Geruka Mela at the Khairbani village is held at the confluence of the Kantawan and the Uttarvahini rivers. It is located about one kilometer from the Indo-Nepal border line. The shrine at Khairbani village is known as Shree Ramjanaki Gerukadham Mandir. The present Mahanth of the shrine is Shree Baalak Das. The fair features regional cultural programs including Netuwa Naach (countryside dance), kirtan, and bhajan. It also holds several games, performances, ping pong, jhula, circus, fastfood and commercial stalls, etc.

== Legend ==
According to legend, the personification of the Geruka river is considered as a sakhi (lady friend) of the Goddess Sita in Hinduism. It is said that at the time of marriage, princess Sita of Mithila worshiped Goddess Gauri and immersed the worship material in the Geruka river. The tradition of worshiping Goddess Gauri and immersing worship material in the river is still alive and continues nowadays. According to the culturalist Parameshwar Kapadi, Goddess Sita blessed her friend Geruka that in the month of Adhika (Purushottam month), the praises of the glory of the Geruka river would be sung, the sins of those who bathe in this river would be destroyed and the wishes would be fulfilled. At that time, she also granted a boon to the Geruka river that all the devis and devatas would gather and bathe in the river during the month of Malmaas.

According to the priest Devachandra Jha, the Geruka river is the form the beloved friend of Goddess Sita and carries divine faith. He says that performing chanting, penance, and charity on the banks of the river, is believed to yield auspicious results. Bathing in the holy waters of this religious river is considered to be fruitful. The Geruka Snaan Mela is held on every three years during the month of Malmaas also known as month of Purushottam. The fair is organised for a time span of one month. The fair is associated with the epic Ramayana. In the text Mithila Mahatmya, there is mention of Goddess Sita used to bathe in the sacred Geruka river. The Hindu adherents believe that taking sacred bathe here during the Malmaas festival will free from sins committed knowingly or unknowingly.
