= Gangasagar, Janakpur =

Sacred pond in Janakpur

Gangasagar (Maithili: गंगासागर) is a pond in Janakpur, Nepal, considered sacred among Hindu adherents in the region. During the festival of Chhath, it serves as a prime location for Chhath Ghat in the city. The pond is beautifully decorated during the festival. Ganga Maha-Aarti is also organised at the bank of the pond.

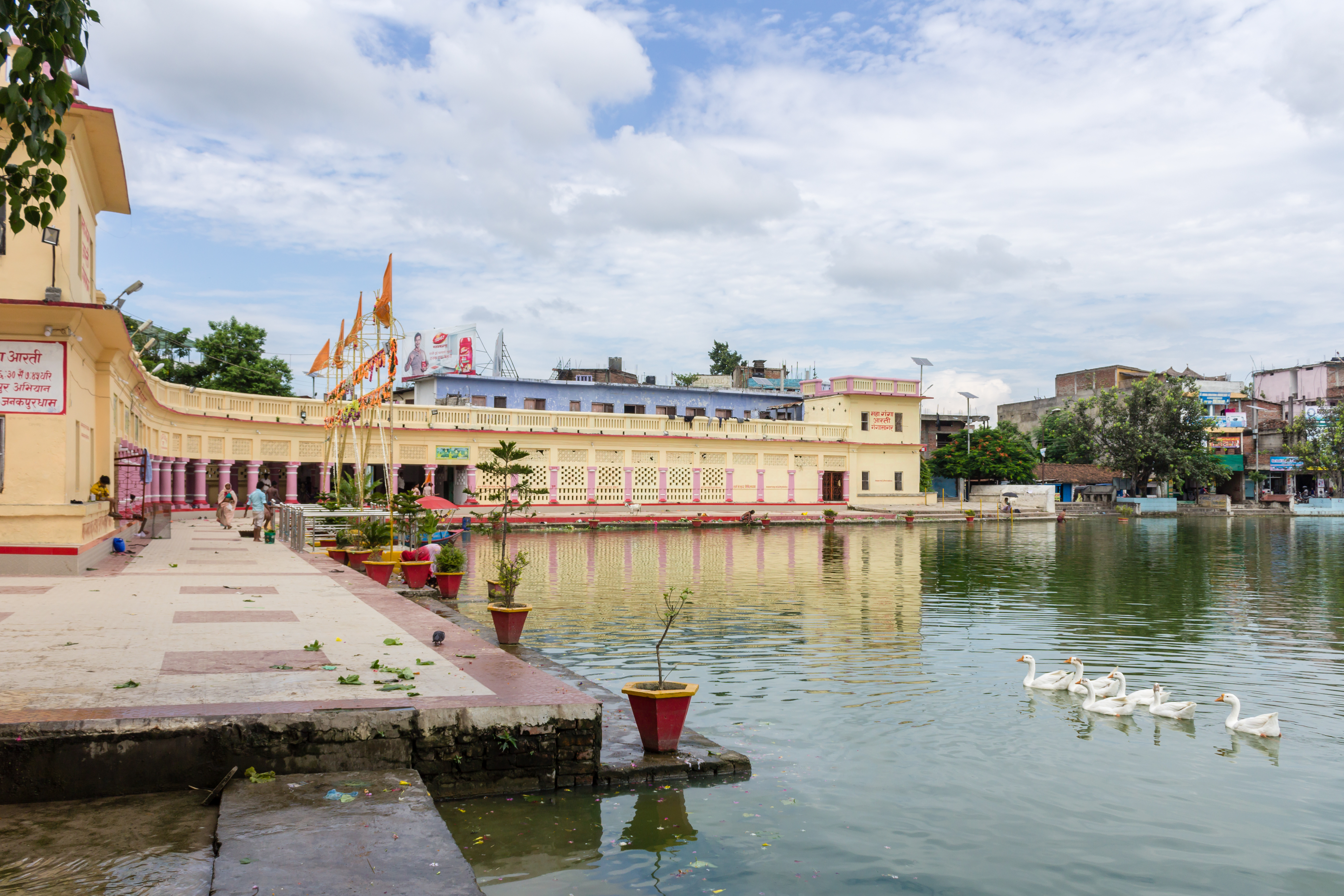
View of the Gangasagar pond in Janakpur

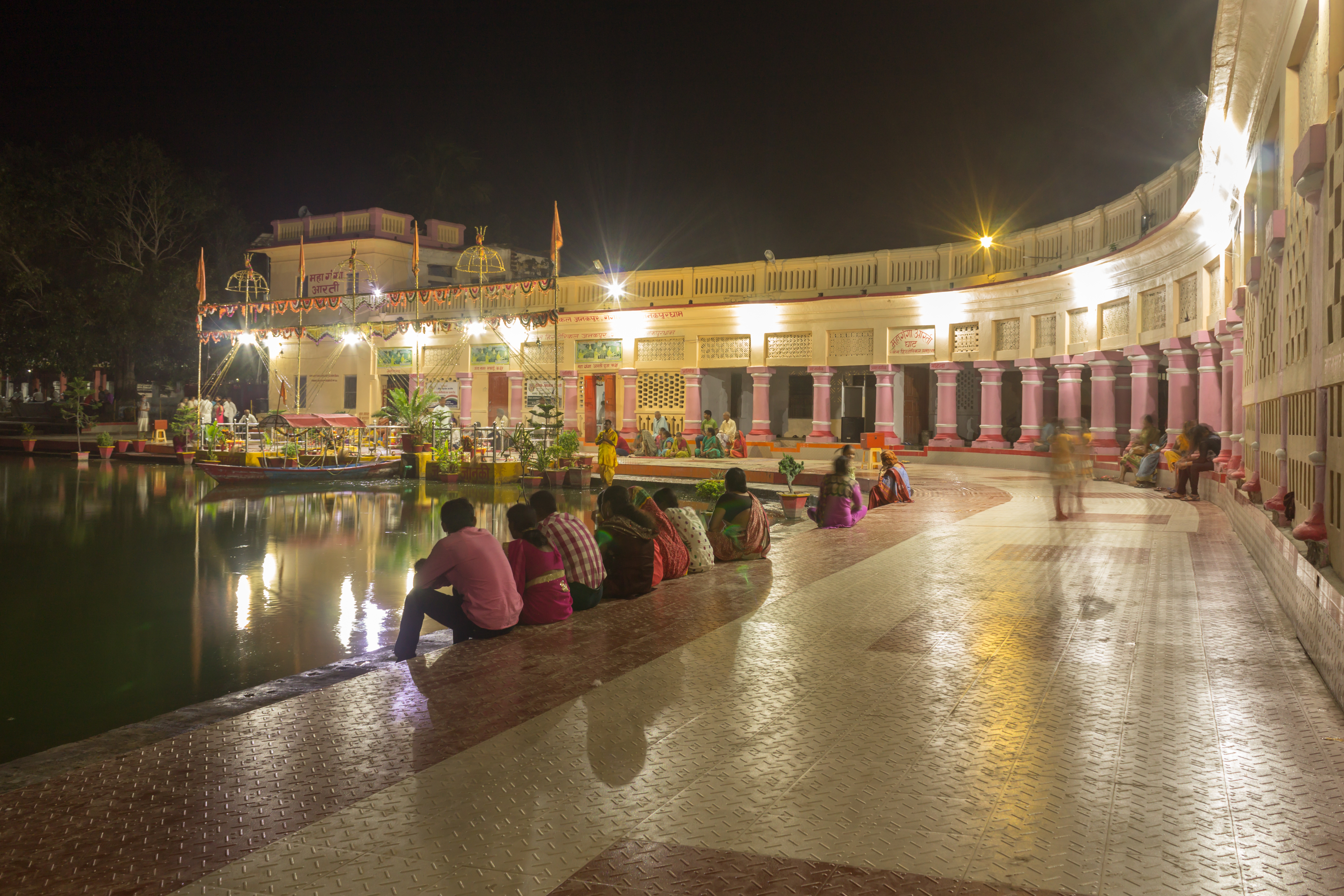
Night view at the Gangasagar pond.

Performance of the Ganga Maha-Aarti at the pond.

== Description ==
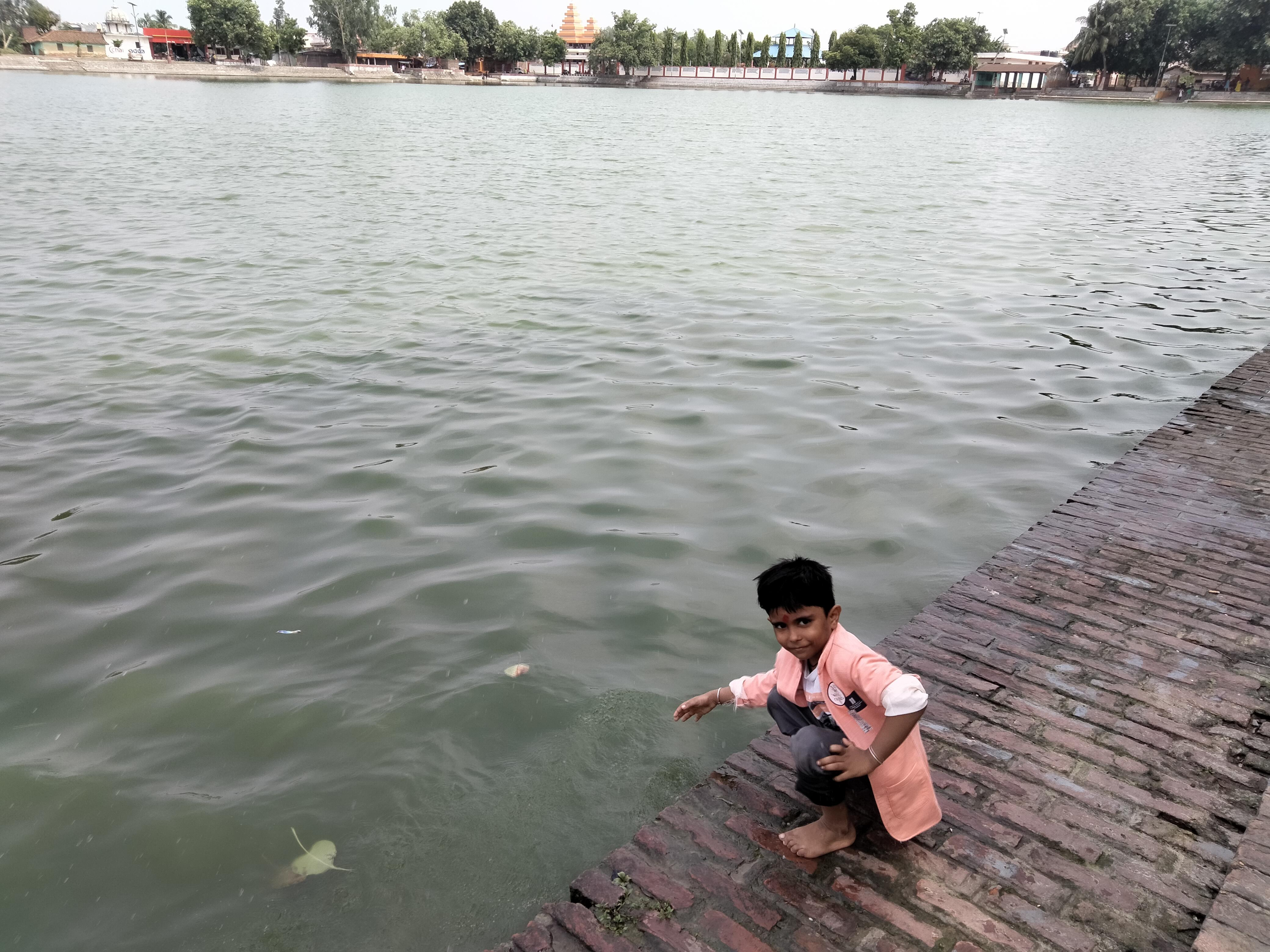
View of the water in the Gangasagar Pokhair

In the Mithila region of the Indian subcontinent, there are many ponds associated with Hinduism. The Nepali city of Janakpur is known as the city of ponds; legend says that the city holds 72 ancient ponds having historical and legendary significance. Gangasagar pond is one of them and is a major sacred pond in the city. It is located at the south of the Shiva Chowk and east from the other sacred pond Dhanushasagar in the city. The sacred ponds of Dhanushasagar and Gangasagar are adjacent to each near the east of the historical Ram Mandir in the city.

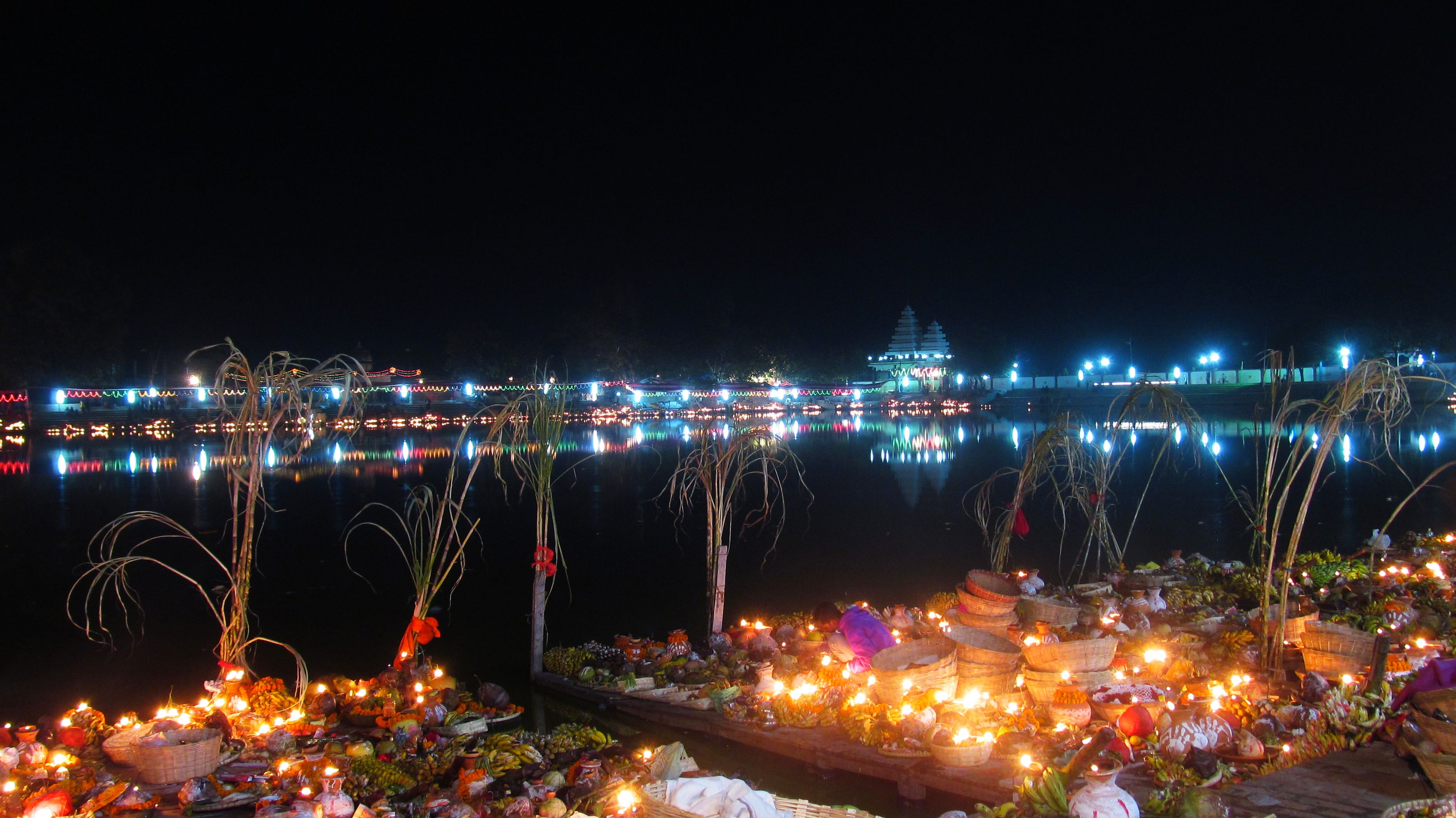
View captured during the Chhath Puja.

== History ==
Gangasagar is recorded by the saint Sannyasi Shurakishordas in the 17th century after his arrival in the region. In May 1884, a Sanskrit school and its hostel was established in the premises of the pond, through Gutti land endowment process in the city.

Around the 1950s, a broken image of Sita was found during the renovation of the ghats of the pond.

== Legendary stories ==
According to legend, King Mithi, the son of King Nimi of Videha, was born from the Manthan of the dead body of the King Nimi at Gangasagar. After his birth, the city of Videha Kingdom was named as Mithila. In the Vishnu Purana, some stories of the King Janaka in Mithila are connected to Gangasagar.

The religious text Janakpur Mahima in the region gives the description of the origin of the sacred pond.
