= Rajdevi Mandir, Janakpur =

Rajdevi Mandir
- राजदेवी मंदिर
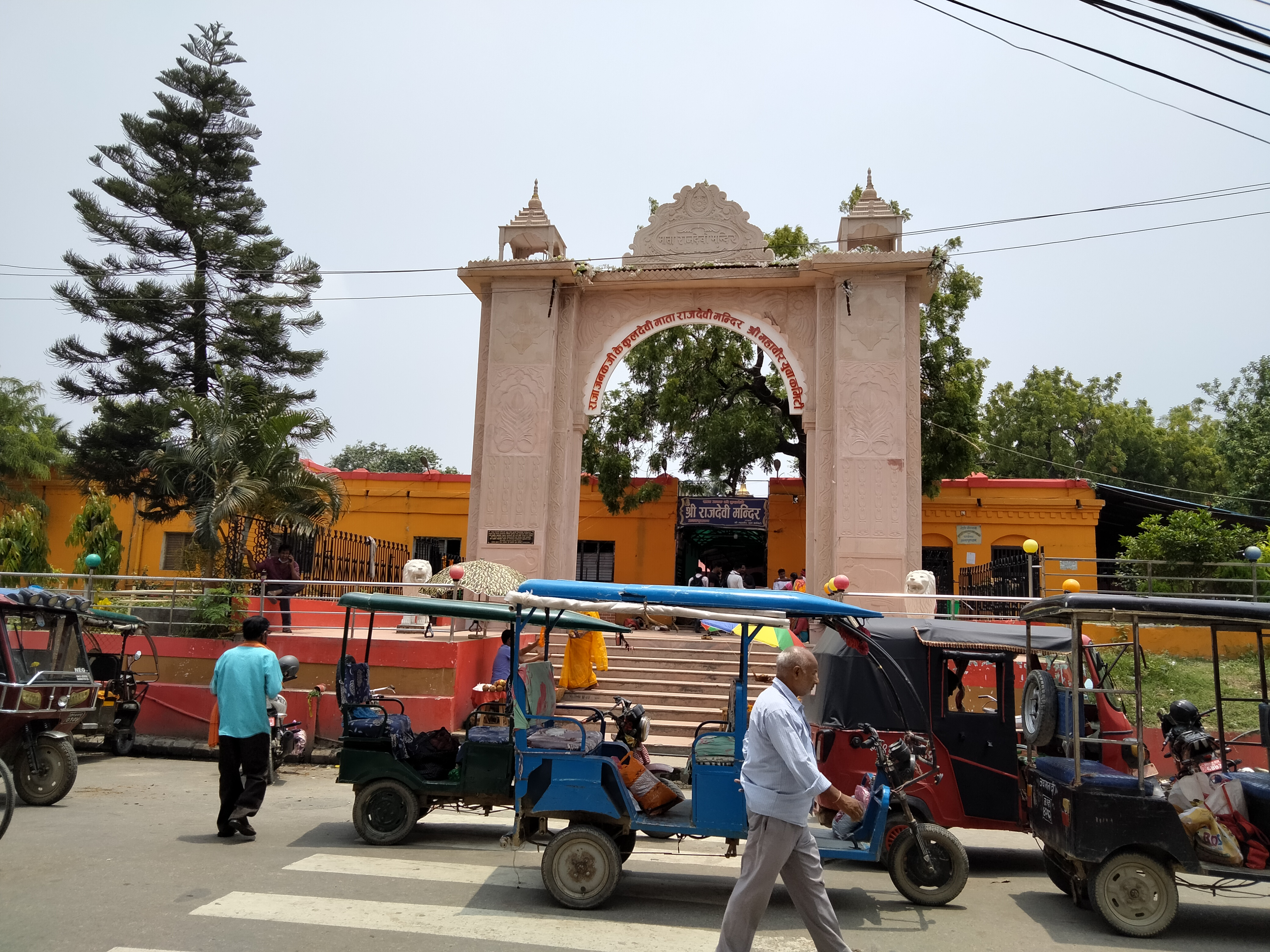
- Entrance Gate of Rajdevi Mandir, Janakpurdham

Religion
- Affiliation: Hinduism
- District: Dhanusha District
- Province: Madhesh Pradesh
- Deity: Rajdevi (Shakti)
- Festival: Durga Puja
- Governing body: Mahavir Youth Committee (since 1990)

Location
- Location: Ram Mandir, Janakpur, Mithila region, Nepal
- Country: Nepal

Rajdevi Mandir (Maithili: राजदेवी मन्दिर) at Janakpurdham is the Kuldevi temple of King Janaka in the Mithila region. It is located at a distance of a few steps from the Janaki Mandir in Janakpur.

== Background ==
According to legend, Rajdevi was the Kuldevi (the family deity) of the King Janaka in Mithila. Rajdevi Mandir is a Shaktipeetha in the Hindu tradition of Mithila.

== Etymology ==
Rajdevi is the composition of the two Indian words Raj and Devi. Raj means state or kingdom or Monarchy and Devi means goddess or holy woman. Hence, the literal meaning of Rajdevi is the Goddess of the Kingdom or the holy woman of the state/kingdom or Royal Goddess.

== Description ==
The temple of Rajdevi is located at the campus of the Ram Mandir complex. The people of Janakpur decorate the Rajdevi Mandir during Sharadiya Navratri. The royal goddess is worshipped in Janakpur with the salute of royal cannons and the prayer for fulfilment of wishes. During the period of the Durga Puja festival especially on Maha Ashtami and Maha Navami, a large number devotees arrive at the temple for worshiping and darshan of the Goddess Rajdevi.

=== Tradition of Bali ===
There is a tradition of goats sacrifice (Balipradan) in the temple on 8th and 9th day during the Durga Puja festival. Devotees from different parts of India and Nepal come here to participate on the occasion of Balipradan.

== Renovation ==
In 2016, the temple was renovated with the help of the local donations. It was also modernised by installing shining marble and tiles inside and outside of the temple. Apart from the renovation of the ancient temple, new construction was also added there. In the premises of the temple, an artificial cave called Baishnavdevi cave was constructed.
