= Khairbanni =

Khairbani खैरबनी
- Village development committee
- Location in Nepal
- Coordinates: 26.86°N 85.70°E
- Country: Nepal
- Zone: Janakpur Zone
- District: Mahottari District

Government
  - Type: Democracy
  - Yadav: Ramdular

Population (2068)
  - Total: 9,140(CBS Nepal)
- Time zone: UTC+5:45 (Nepal Time)
- Postal code: 524 04 185 0 74

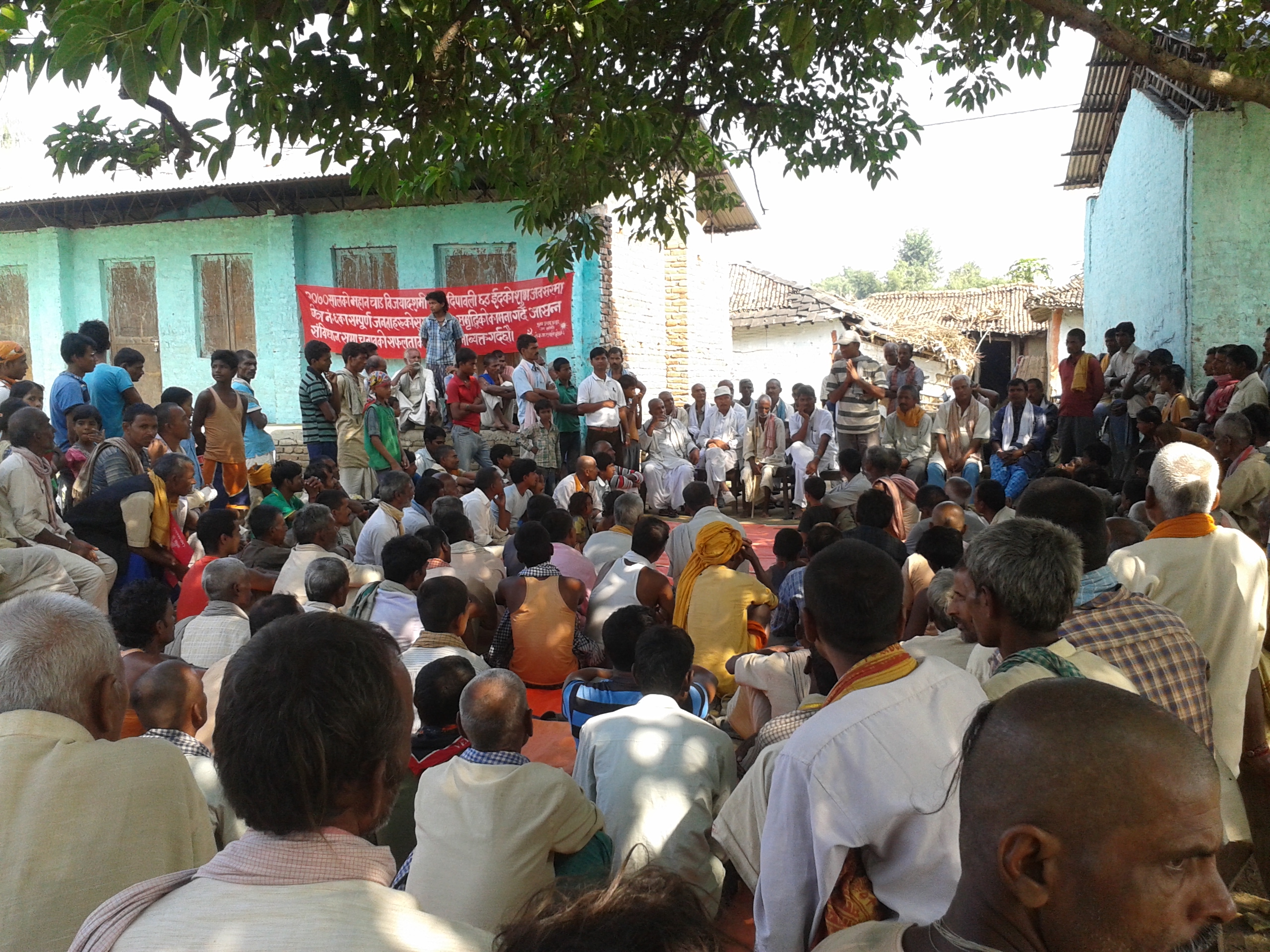
Khairbani people at government school with Ex- VDC President Ramdular Yadav, Koshilal Yadav, Mahesh Adhikari, Murali Manohar Adhikari, Krishna Mohan Adhikari, Dhiraj Raj Adhikari, Ranjan Kumar Yadav and others in Khairbani

Khairbani is a village development committee in Mahottari District in the Janakpur Zone of south-eastern Nepal. At the time of the 1991 Nepal census it had a population of 5629 people living in 1025 individual households. But now it had a population 9140 according to the 2011 Nepal census. In the village, there is a holy place named Geurkadham (Temple of Lord shiva) where Geruka Snaan Mela is organized.
