= Janaki Mandir =

Hindu temple in Nepal

- जानकी मन्दिर
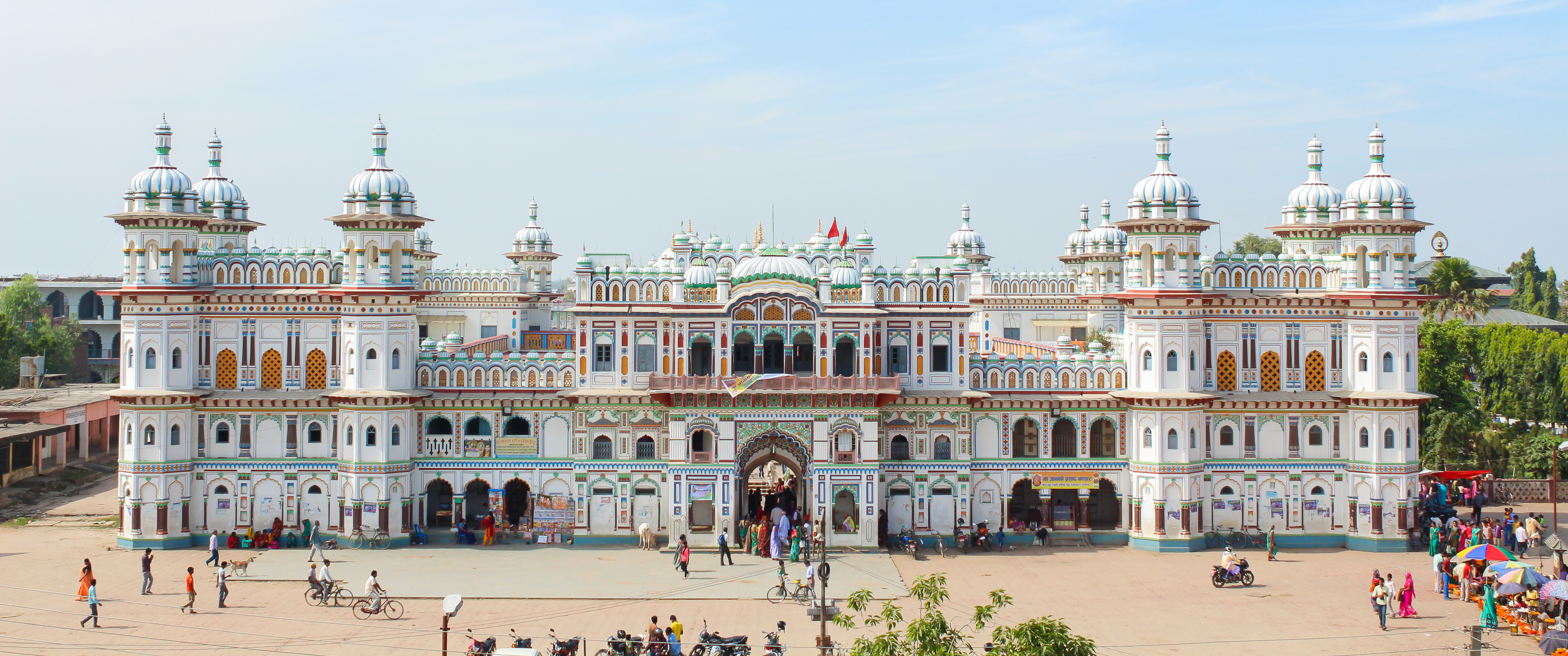
- Front view of Janaki Mandir

- Location in Nepal

Religion
- Affiliation: Hinduism
- District: Dhanusa District
- Province: Madhesh Pradesh
- Deity: Sita and Rama
- Festivals: Vivaha Panchami, Rama Navami, Dashain, Mithila Jhulnotsav and Tihar

Location
- Location: Janakpurdham
- Country: Nepal
- Interactive map of Janaki Mandir
- Coordinates: 26°43′50″N 85°55′32″E

Architecture
- Type: Hindu-Kushwaha
- Creator: Queen Vrisha Bhanu of Tikamgarh
- Completed: 1967 BS (1910 AD)

Specifications
- Temple: 70
- Monument: 27
- Elevation: 78 m (256 ft)

Protected Ancient Monument
- Law: Ancient Monuments Preservation Act, 2013 (1956)
- ID: NP-DHA-01

Jānakī Mandir (Nepali: जानकी मन्दिर) is a Hindu temple in Jānakpurdham, Nepal, dedicated to the Hindu goddess Sītā. It is an example of Koiri Hindu architecture. Fully built in bright white and constructed in an area of 1,480 square metres (15,930 sq. feet), it is a three-storied structure made entirely of stone and marble. It is a major destination for the tourism in Mithila.

The walls of the temple have Mādhubānī paintings. All its 60 rooms are decorated with the flag of Nepal, coloured glass, engravings, and paintings, with lattice windows and turrets.

The Sītā Svayaṃvara (groom choosing ceremony) of Jānakī (Sītā) and Rāma as described in the Rāmāyaṇa is believed to have occurred here at the wedding mandapa attached to this temple. The site was designated as a UNESCO tentative site in 2008. The Government of Nepal has declared the temple vicinity as a protected monument zone, under the Ancient Monuments Preservation Act, 1956.

== History ==
The mandir is also popularly known as the Nau Lakha Mandir (meaning "nine lakhs"). The cost for the construction of the temple was about the same amount of gold coins: nine lakhs or nine hundred thousand gold coins, hence the name. Queen Vrisha Bhanu of Orchha State (also known as Urchha, Ondchha and Tikamgarh) built the temple in 1910 AD. This temple lies at Janakpur, Nepal.

In 1657, a golden statue of the Goddess Sita was found at the very spot, and Sita is said to have lived there. The legend said it that it was built on the holy site where Sannyasi Shurkishordas had found the images of Goddess Sita. In fact, Shurkishordas was the founder of modern Janakpur and the great saint and poet who preached about the Sita Upasana (also called Sita Upanishad) philosophy. Legend has claimed it that King Janak (Seeradhwaj) performed the worship of Shiva-Dhanus on this site.

As of 26 April 2015, the temple is reported to have partly collapsed from the earthquake in April 2015.

== Pilgrimage ==
Every year, thousands of pilgrims from Nepal, India, Sri Lanka, and other countries visit Ram Janaki Temple to worship Lord Ram and Sita. Many worshippers visit the temple during the festivals of Ram Nawami, Vivaha Panchami, Dashain and Tihar.

== Gallery ==
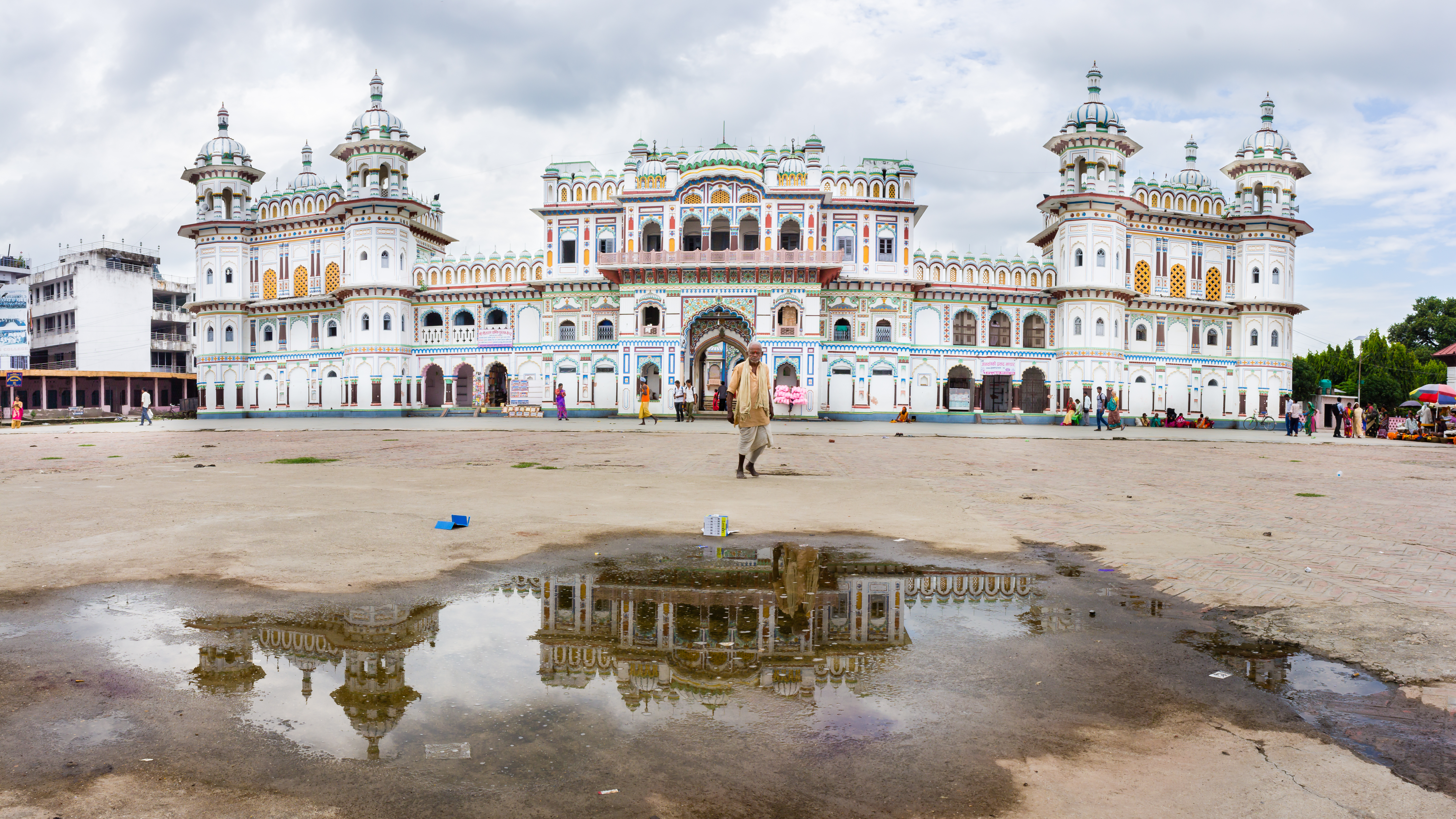
Panoramic view (2016)

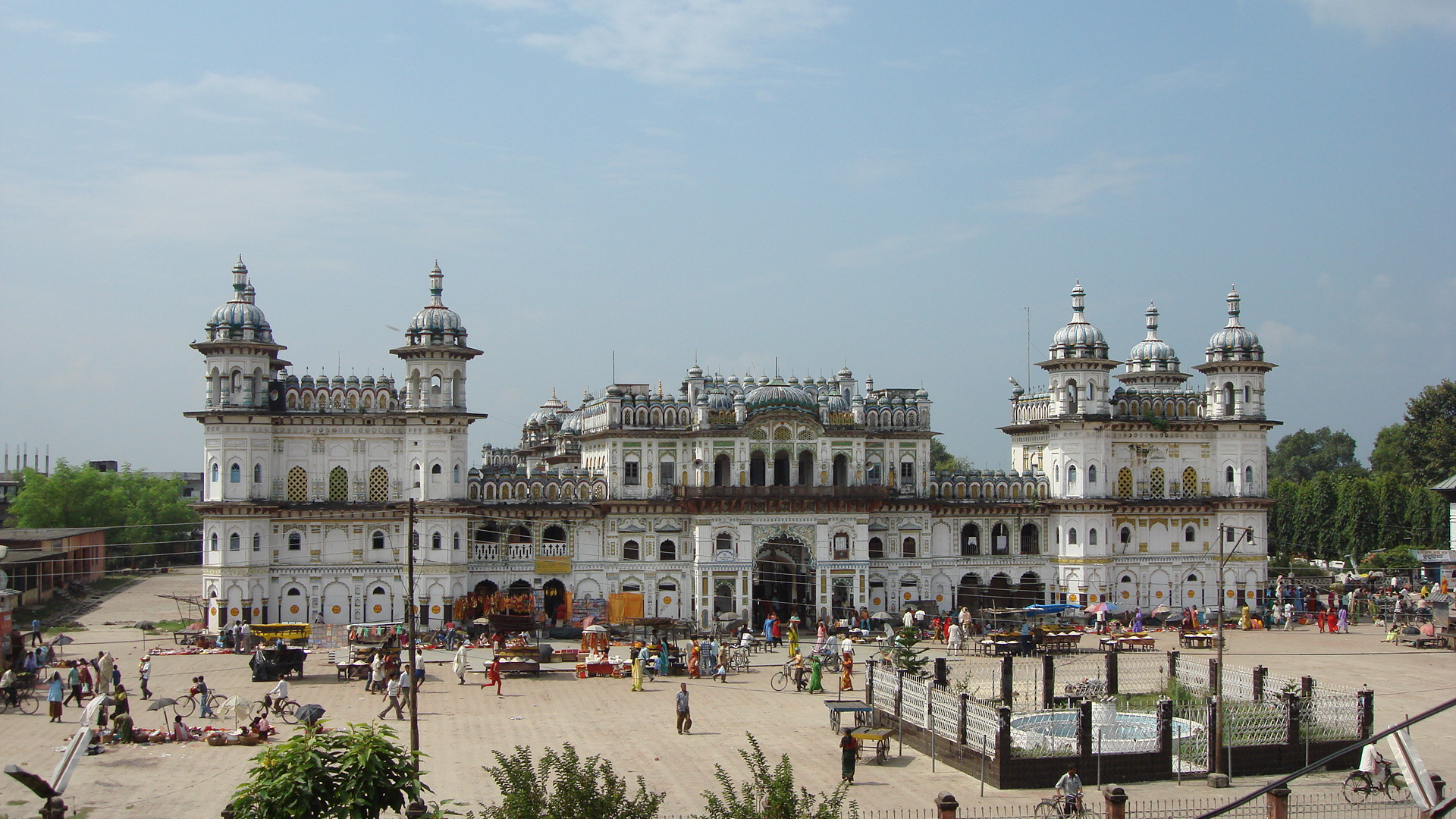
Front view (2007)

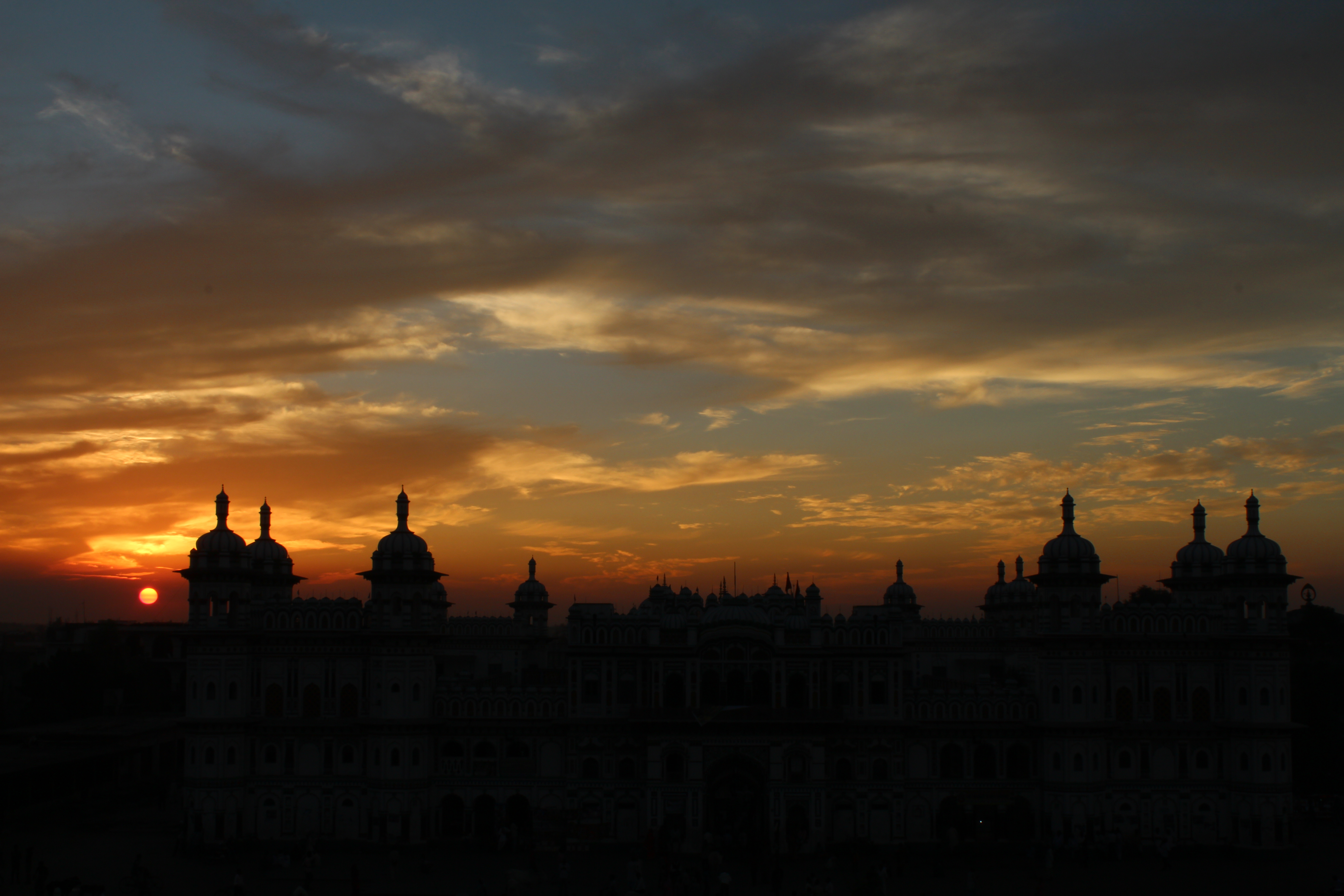
Sunset view (2012)

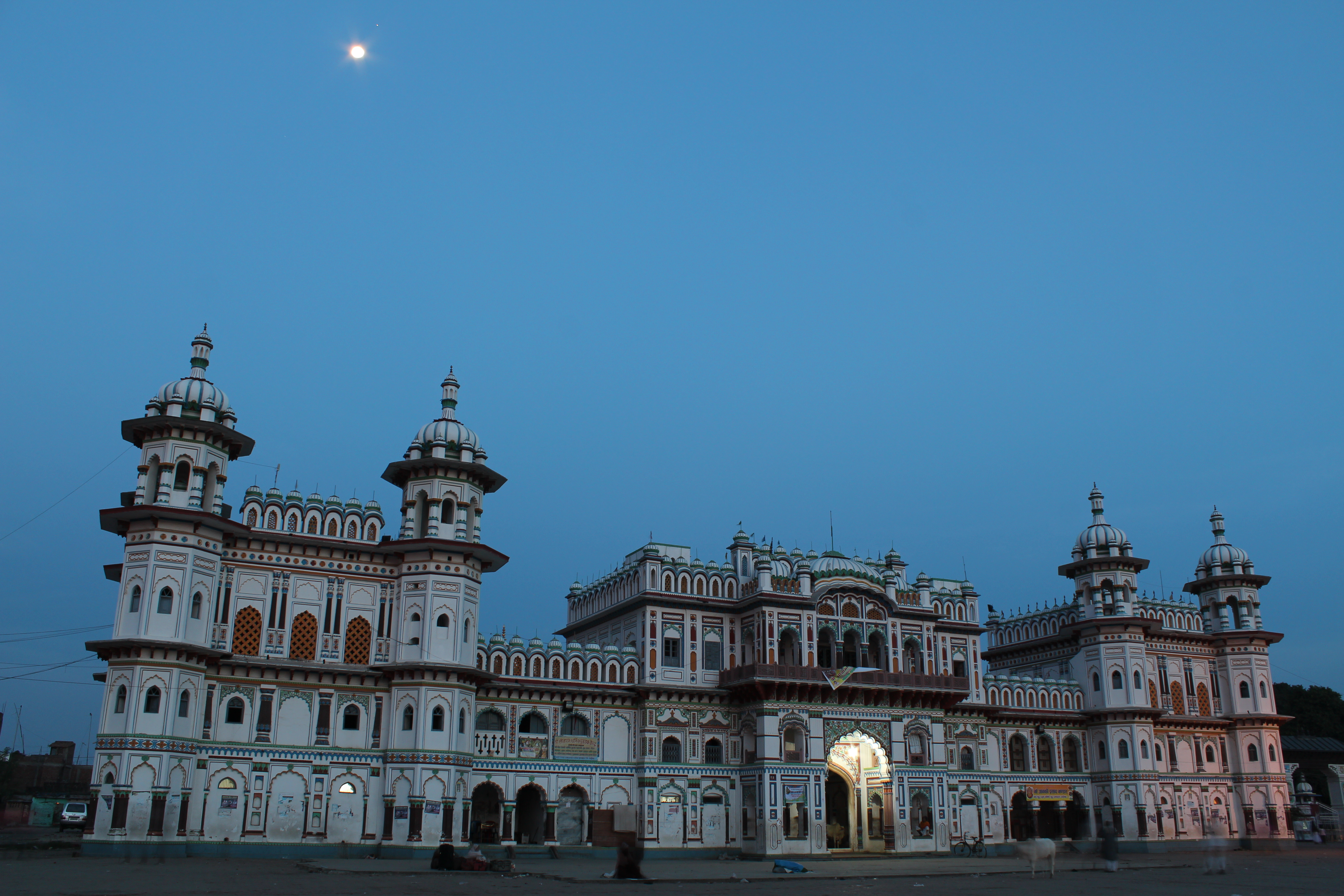
Early morning view (2012)

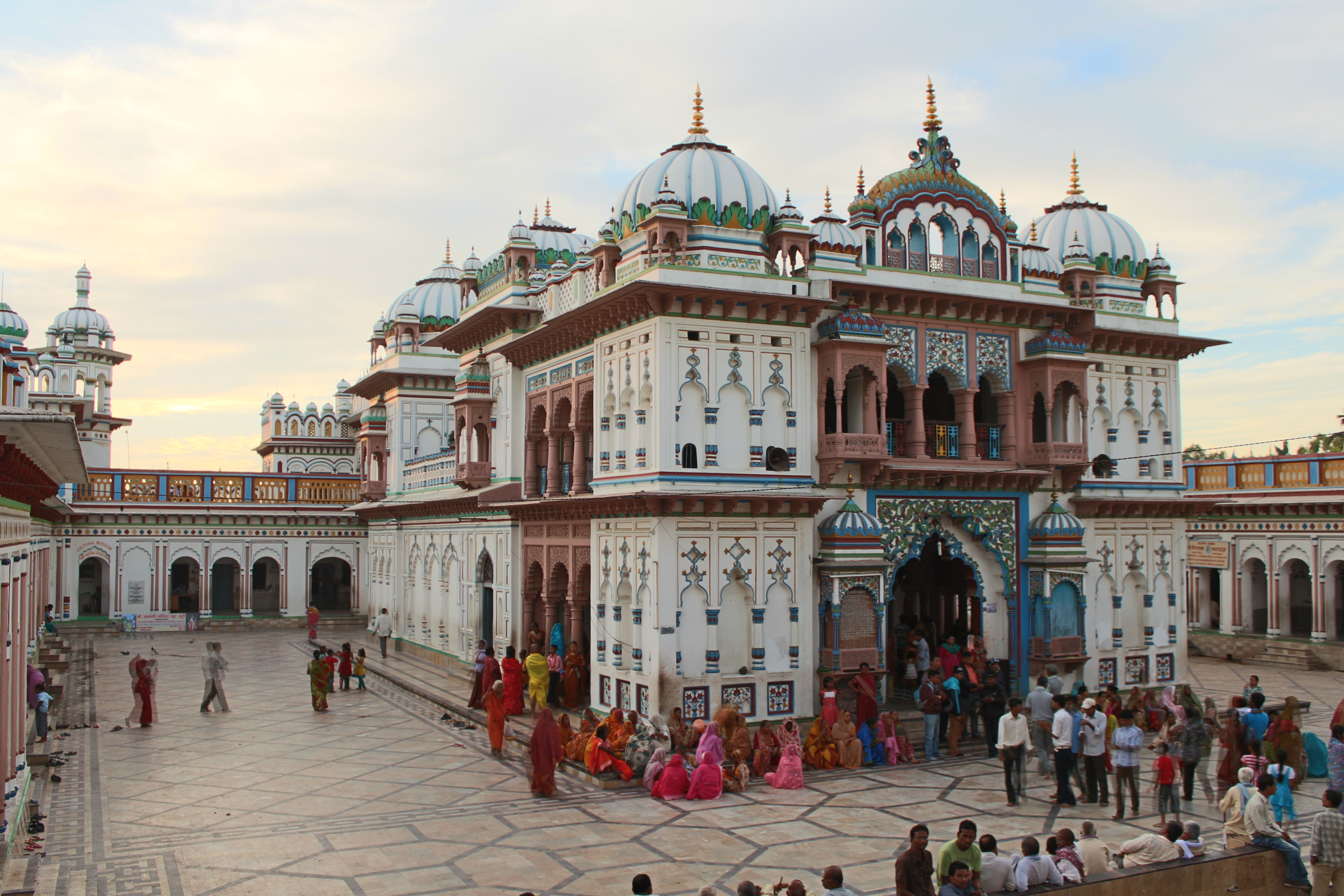
Inside view

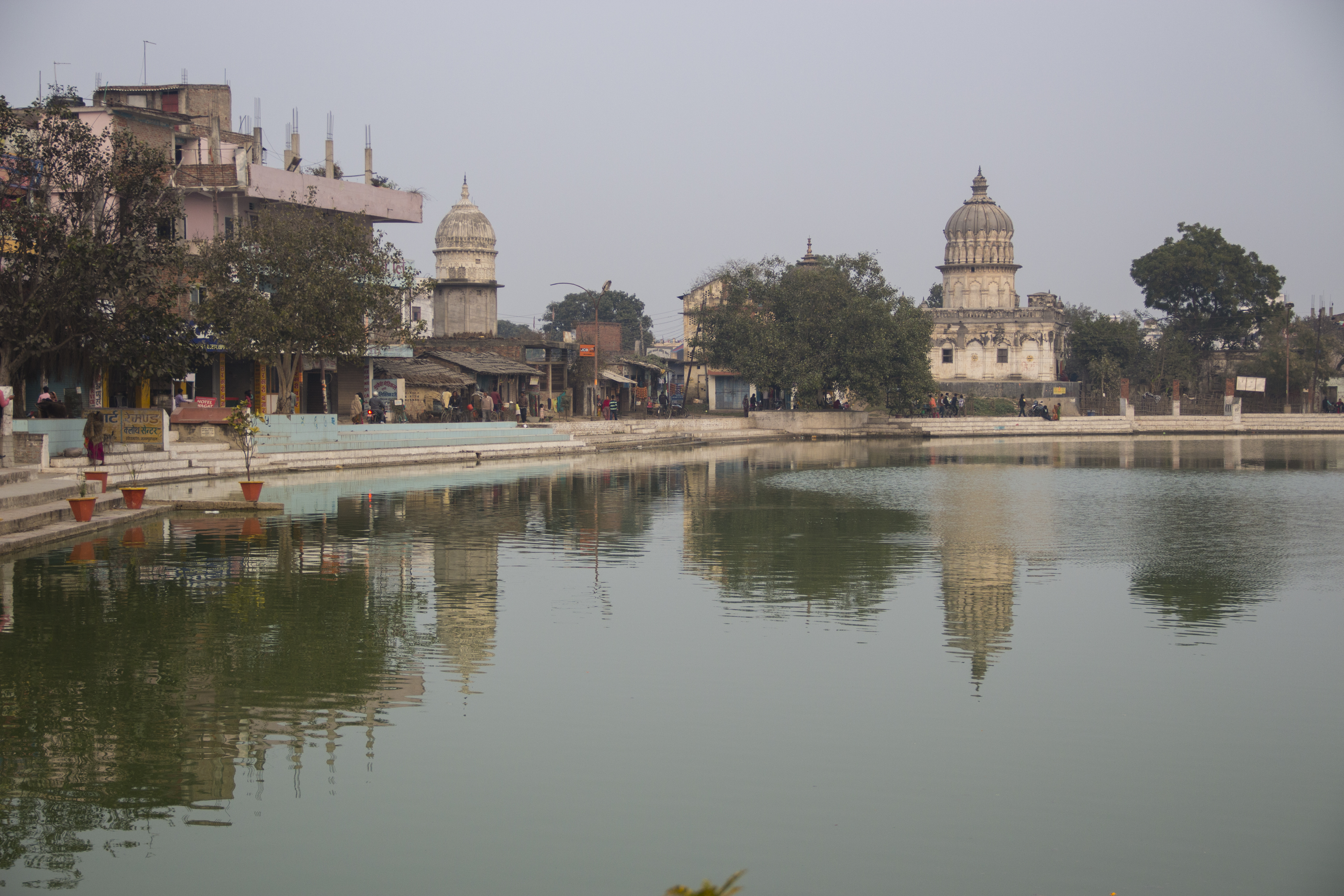
Ganga Sagar

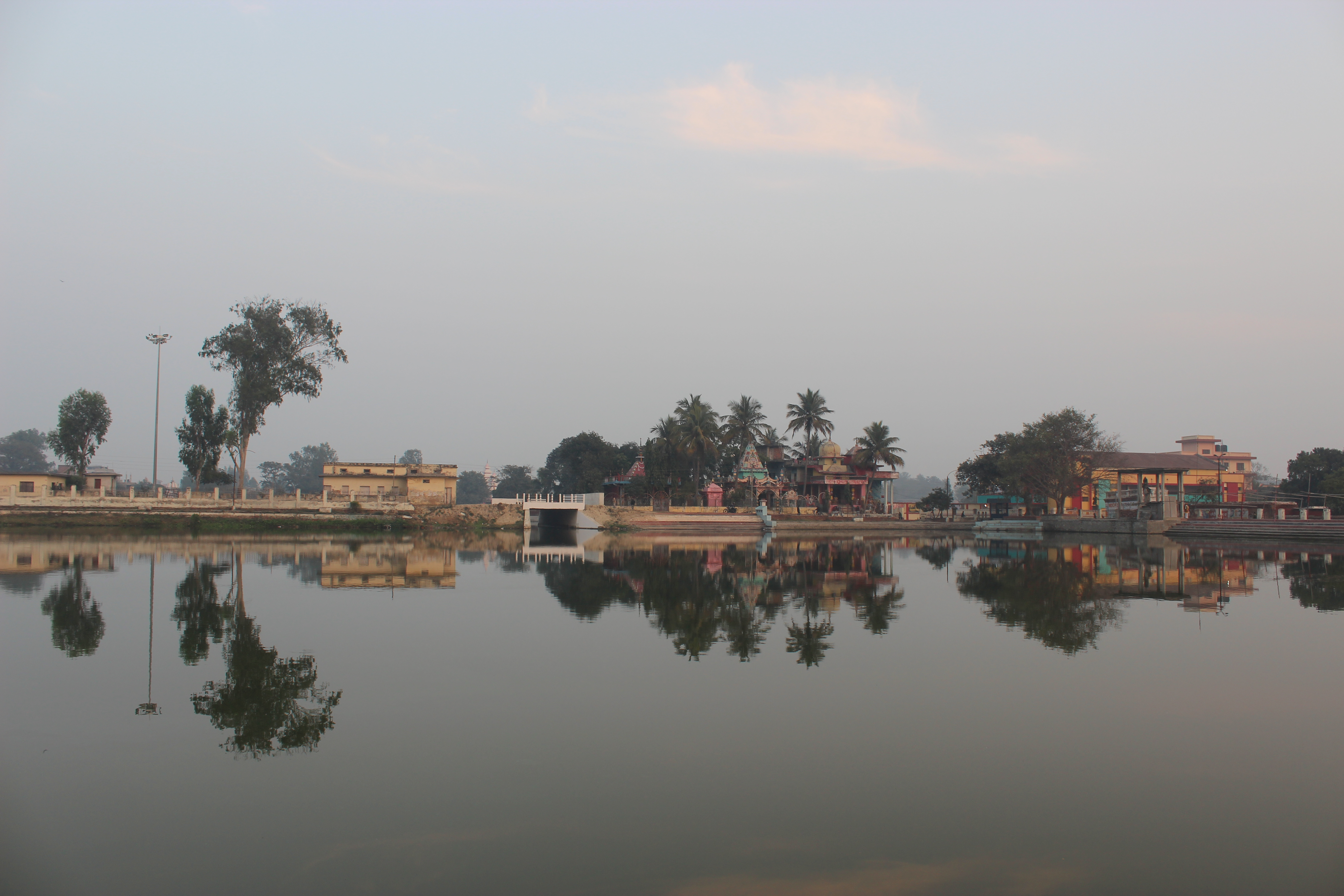
Dhanush Saagar

== See also ==
- Ram Mandir, Janakpur
- Sita Mai Temple
- Mata Kaushalya Temple
- List of Hindu temples in Nepal
- Tourism in Mithila
- Devashila Yatra
