= Devashila Yatra =

Historical Hindu Yatra in the Indian subcontinent

Devashila Yatra (Devanagari: देवशिला यात्रा) was a famous Hindu religious processions journey in which two large and ancient Shaligram stones were brought from the Gandaki River in Nepal to Ayodhya in India. The Yatra was conducted in the year 2023. It was a significant event for Hindu devotees, with large numbers of people gathering along the route to pay their respects to the sacred stones. Initially it was supposed that the sacred stones would be used to construct the idol of Lord Rama but later these were not used in the construction of the idol due to some religious reasons.

== Background ==
Every year, on the Shukla Panchami of the Hindu month Margashirsha, a marriage anniversary of Lord Rama and Goddess Sita known as Vivah Panchami is organised at the Janaki Mandir located in Janakpurdham. On the occasion of the Vivah Panchami, a wedding procession of Lord Rama arrives to Janakpur from Ayodhya. The wedding procession of Lord Rama is called as Ram Baraat. After the completion of the wedding anniversary of Lord Rama and Goddess Sita, the Ram Baraat departs from Janakpur to Ayodhya. There is a tradition in the Janaki Mandir that at the time of departure of the Ram Baraat, the Mahant of Janaki Mandir gives some gifts to the wedding guests. The then Mahant Ram Tapeshwardas Vaishnav of the Janaki Mandir felt that the idol of Ramlala to be installed in the Ram Mandir being built in Ayodhya, should be made from sacred Shaligram of Krishna Gandaki river.

== History ==
These sacred stones were given as gifts to the Ram Baraat that had come from Ayodhya to Janakpur during the occasion of the Vivah Panchami festival in the year 2022. These were gifted at the time of the departure of the Ram Baraat from Janakpur to Ayodhya. On 28 November 2022, the Mahant Ram Tapeshwardas Vaishnav of Janakpurdham, had taken resolution during the occasion of the Vivah Panchami that these huge Shaligram Devashilas would be given as a gift to prepare the idol of Ramlala. According to Rajendra Pankaj, the convener of Ram Baraat cum coordinator of Devashila Yatra, the resolution was taken after worshipping three small Shaligram stones by the Mahant. After that the Mahant of Janakpurdham asked for Devashilas from the federal Government of Nepal as well as the provincial Government of Gandaki Pradesh to gift in the Janaki Vivah Panchami. These Devashilas were not available at the time of the occasion of the marriage anniversary of Lord Rama and Goddess Sita, then. In 2023, the governments handed over the demanded two huge Devashilas to the Mahant of Janakpurdham. After that it was finally handed over to the convener of Ram Baraat as gifts promised earlier by the Mahant.
