= Sannyasi Shurkishordas =

Founder of the modern city of Janakpur

- सन्यासी शूरकिशोरदास
- Other name: Mahatma Shurakishordas Vaishnav
- Siglum: Sür Kiśor
- Occupations: Hindu saint and poet
- Years active: 1657 AD
- Era: 17th century CE
- Known for: Founder of modern city of Janakpur
- Honours: Adi Sant, Mahatma

Sannyasi Shurkishordas (Maithili: सन्यासी शूरकिशोरदास, Romanised: Sür Kiśor) was a Hindu ascetic, saint, and poet in the Mithila region of the Indian subcontinent. He lived in the city of Janakpur in Nepal. He is popularly known for the foundation of the modern city of Janakpur in the region. He is also honoured as the Adi Sant of the city. In 1657 AD, he suddenly discovered a golden statue of the goddess Sita at the exact location where the present Janaki Mandir lies in the modern city of Janakpur.

== Early life ==
Sannyasi Shurkishordas belonged to Lohagarh in the state of Rajasthan in India.

== Later life ==
According to local legend, there was a forest in the region of modern-day Janakpur. In the 17th-century, Shurakishordas came to the area from Lohagarh in search of the ancient city of the King Janaka in Mithila. During his Tapasya he found a golden statue of the goddess Sita. There, he began worshiping Sita and established a small temple. He also built a kutti (hermitage) to live in. He preached Sita Upasana or Sita Upanishad to the devotees coming at the temple. It is said that the King Maniksen of the Makwanpur Kingdom was very impressed by the devotion of Shurakishordas. Therefore, the king donated 1,400 bighas of land there, in the year 1784 Bikram Samvat.

In the year Bikram Samvat 1787 (1730 AD), he started the Mithila Jhulnotsav dedicated to Lord Rama and Goddess Sita at the temple.

== Legacy ==
In 1911, Vrishbhanu Kuvari, the queen of the Tikamgarh Kingdom, built a grand temple to Sita on the site, known as Janaki Mandir.
