= Mithila Jhulnotsav =

Festival in Mithila dedicated to Lord Rama and Goddess Sita

Mithila Jhulnotsav मिथिला झूलनोत्सव
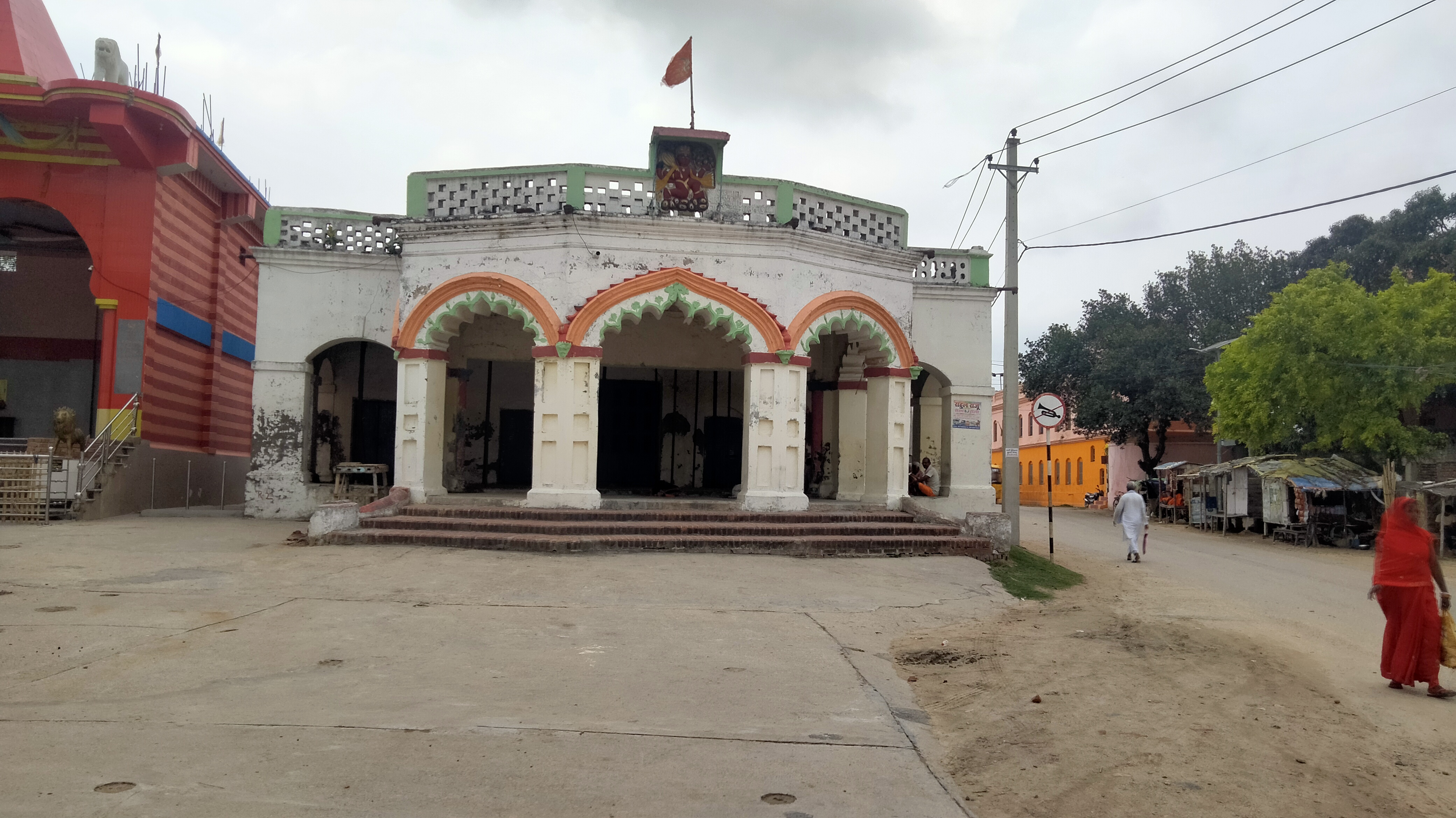
- View of Ram Jhulan Bhawan (Jhulaghar) at the premises of the Lakshminarayan Matha.
- Nickname: Jhulan Puja
- Genre: Hindu festival dedicated to Lord Rama and Goddess Sita in Mithila
- Begins: Tritiya Shukla Paksha Shravan (Hariyali Tritiya)
- Ends: Purnima Tithi Shravan (Rakshabandhan)
- Frequency: Annually
- Venue: Lakshminarayan Matha
- Countries: India and Nepal
- Years active: Treta Yuga

Mithila Jhulnotsav (Maithili: मिथिला झूलनोत्सव) is a fifteen-day festival celebrated in the Mithila region of the Indian subcontinent. The major celebration of the festival is organised at the premises of the Lakshminarayan Matha in the Matihani town of the Mahottari district and Janaki Mandir in Janakpur of the Dhanusha district in the Madhesh Pradesh province of Nepal.

== Description ==
It is an annual festival celebrated with great pomp and show dedicated to Lord Rama and Goddess Sita in the region. During the period of the festival, a grand cultural fair known as Mithila Jhulnotsav Mela or Jhulan Mela is held at the premises. The festival is believed to be existing since the Treta Yuga of Ramayana. The tradition of celebrating this festival at premises of the Lakshminarayan Matha in Matihani has been going on since about 250 hundred years ago. It was started by then Maan Mahant Ramdas Vaishnav of the matha. Apart from the Lakshminarayan Matha, it is also traditionally celebrated at several other monasteries (Matha) and temples in the Mithila region of India and Nepal.

=== Celebration in Janakpur ===
The Mithila Jhulnotsav is also celebrated at the famous Janaki Mandir in the city of Janakpur in Nepal. In Janakpur, it was started by Adi sant Sannyasi Shurakishordas in the year of Bikram Samvat 1787.

== Dates ==
The fifteen-day annual celebration of the Mithila Jhulnotsav begins with jaighosh (loudly chanting) of Jai Shree Sitaram. The festival starts on the Tritiya tithi of the Shukla Paksha in the Shravan month of the Hindu calendar. This day is also known as Hariyali Tritiya. The festival is concluded with Rakshabandhan on the Shravan Purnima. It is concluded by cutting the rope of the Jhula along with worshiping Lord Rama and Goddess Sita and chanting Sitaram at the Purnima night time.

== Observances ==
Every evening at six o'clock during the festival, the ashtadhatu idol of Lord Lakshminarayan inside the Lakshminarayan Mandir at the monastery is brought on a silver throne to the Jhulaghar (Ram Jhulan Bhawan) in the premises by the sadhu-saint and Mahant chanting Jai Shree Sitaram with music and instruments. After that Lord Lakshminarayan is worshipped there and from eight o'clock in the night, the idol is swung in a religiously decorated swing. During this period various cultural programs are conducted there.

During the ritualistic observance, a large number of devotees from more than twenty neighboring villages near the Indo-Nepal border fluck to the Jhulaghar for performing worship, darshan and watching the Jhulan ceremony of the God. They also enjoy the festival's fair organised at the premises.
