= Vrishbhanu Kuvari =

Queen of Tikamgarh

Vrishbhanu Kunwari
- Maharani of Tikamgarh
Era dates
- 19th century CE
Regnal name
- Maharani Vrishbhanu Kunwari
- Hindi: वृषभानु कुमारी
- House: Tikamgarh
- Religion: Hinduism

Vrishbhanu Kuvari (Devanagari: वृषभानु कुमारी) also known as Vrishbhanu Kunwari or Brishbhanu Kunwari was a queen of the Tikamgarh Kingdom in India. She was the queen of the kingdom during the 19th century. She was the consort of the Maharaj Mahendra Pratap Singh of the kingdom. She is well known for building and renovation of several notable temples in the region of the Indian subcontinent.

== Later life ==
According to the Mahanth of the Janaki Mandir in Janakpur, the queen Vrishbhanu Kunwari was initially childless. Then, she came to Janakpur for worship and darshan of Goddess Sita wishing a child, in the mid 19th century. It is said that her wish was fulfilled after the darshan of Goddess Sita. After the fulfillment of the wish, the queen Vrishbhanu Kunwari built the magnificent temple of Goddess Sita in the city of Janakpur in the Mithila region of the Himalayan nation Nepal. The temple was built at a cost of nine lakh. The temple is known Janaki Mandir or Naulakha Mandir. According to Hindu adherents, the city of Janakpur in Nepal is believed to be the location of King Siradhwaja Janaka's court.
