= Ram Mandir, Janakpur =

Ram Mandir of Janakpur

Coordinates: 26°43′42″N 85°55′37″E

Ram Mandir
- राम मंदिर
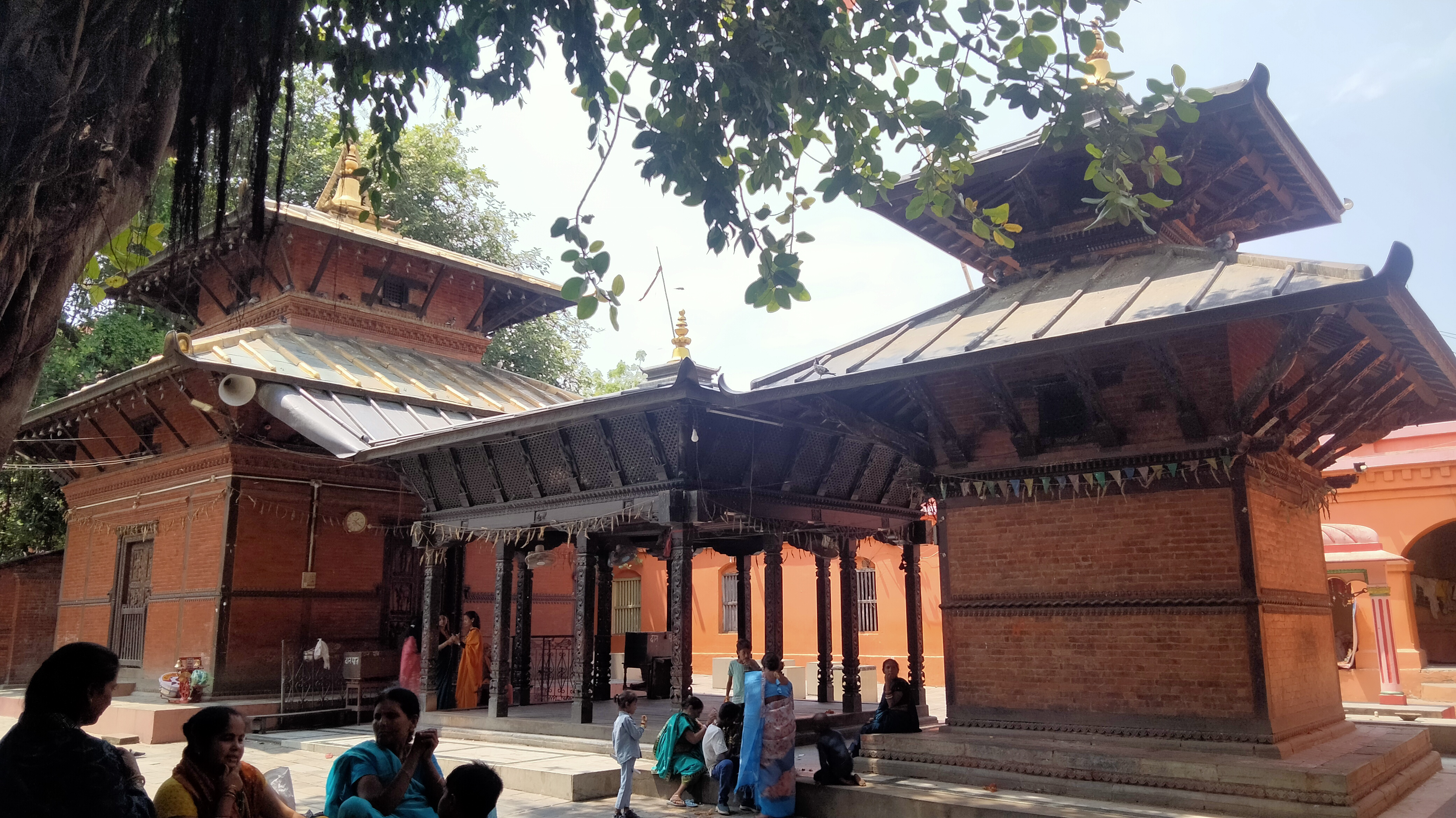
- View of Ram Mandir in Janakpur

Religion
- Affiliation: Hinduism
- District: Dhanusha
- Province: Madhesh Pradesh
- Deity: Lord Rama
- Festival: Ram Navami, Dussehra

Location
- Location: Janakpur, Mithila region, Nepal
- Country: Nepal

Architecture
- Type: Nepalese
- Founder: Chaturbhuj Giri; Amar Singh Thapa
- Site area: Religious, Historical and Urban

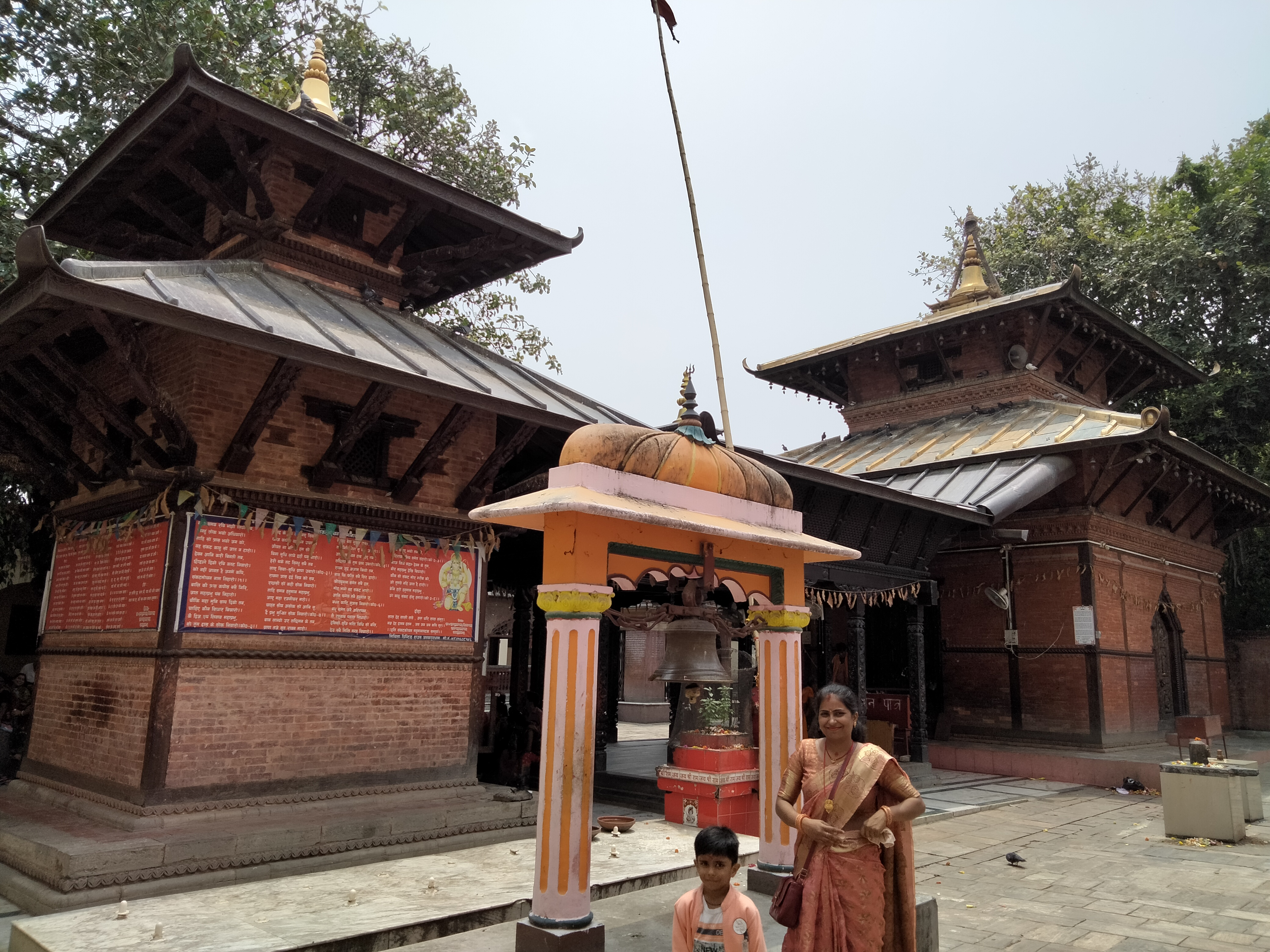
View of Ram Mandir at Janakpur Dham in the Mithila region of Nepal

Ram Mandir at Janakpurdham is a historical Hindu temple devoted to Lord Rama. It is located near the Janaki Mandir in Janakpur, Nepal.

== Description ==
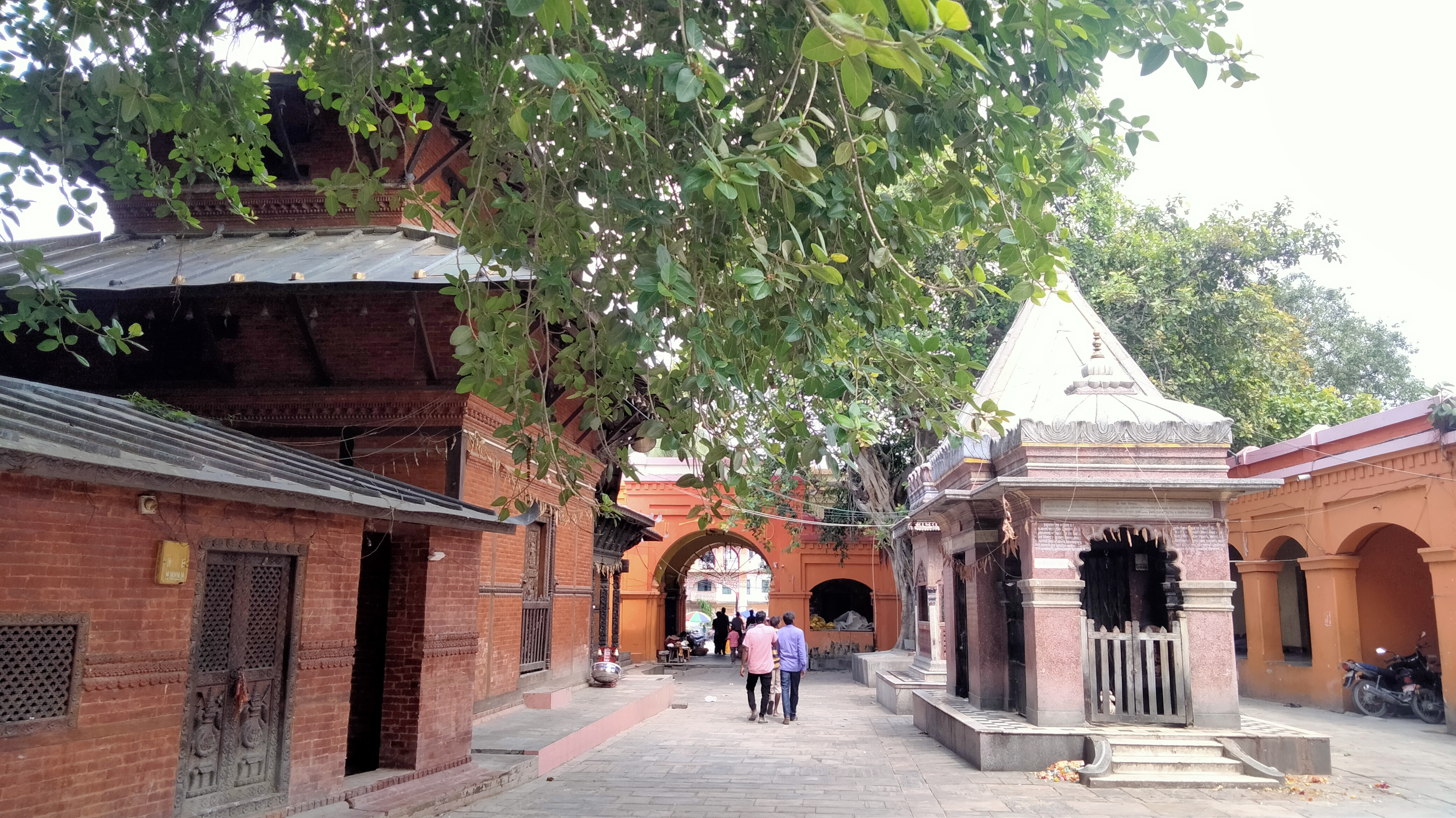
View Ram Mandir from backside

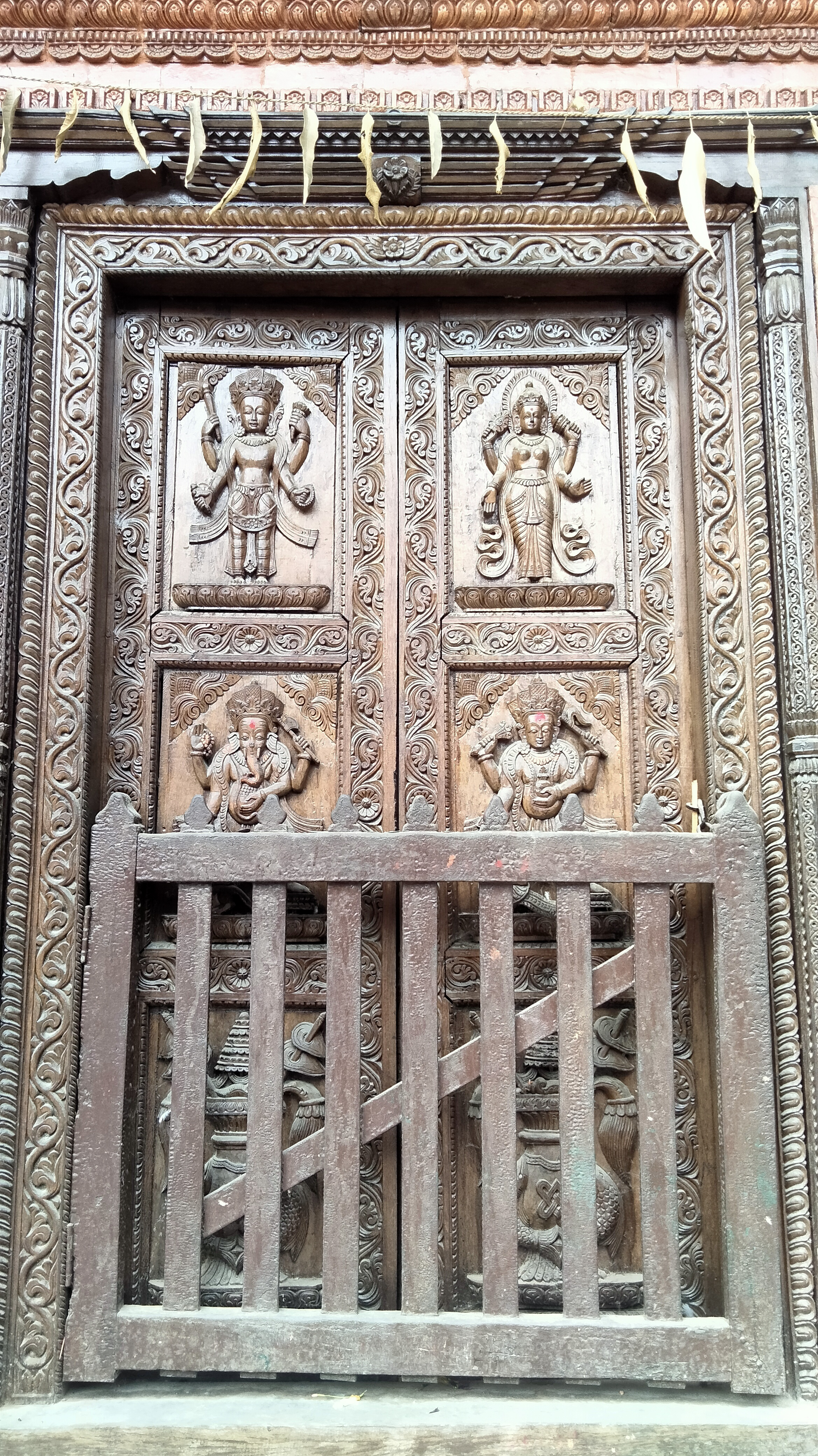
Artistic images carved on the door of the Ram Mandir

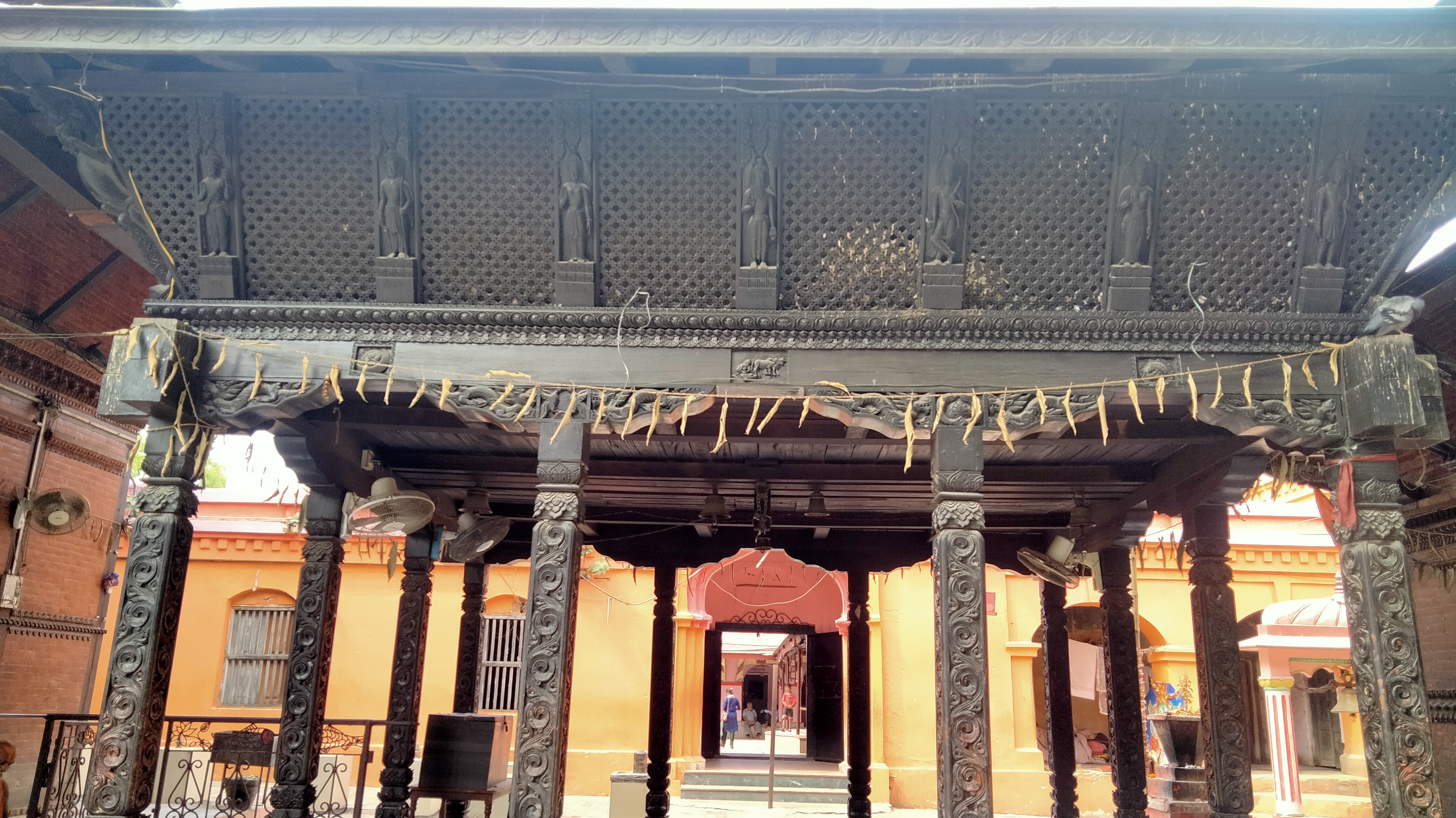
Artistic works

The Ram Mandir is one of the oldest Hindu temples in the city of Janakpur. In the 17th century, it was built by Chaturbhuj Giri. It was later rebuilt in 1782 by the Gorkhali General, Amar Singh Thapa. The architecture of the temple is in the traditional Nepalese pagoda style. The temple is located directly in front of the sacred Dhanushsagar Lake. Within the Ram Mandir complex, there is also a Shaktipeetha known as Rajdevi Mandir.

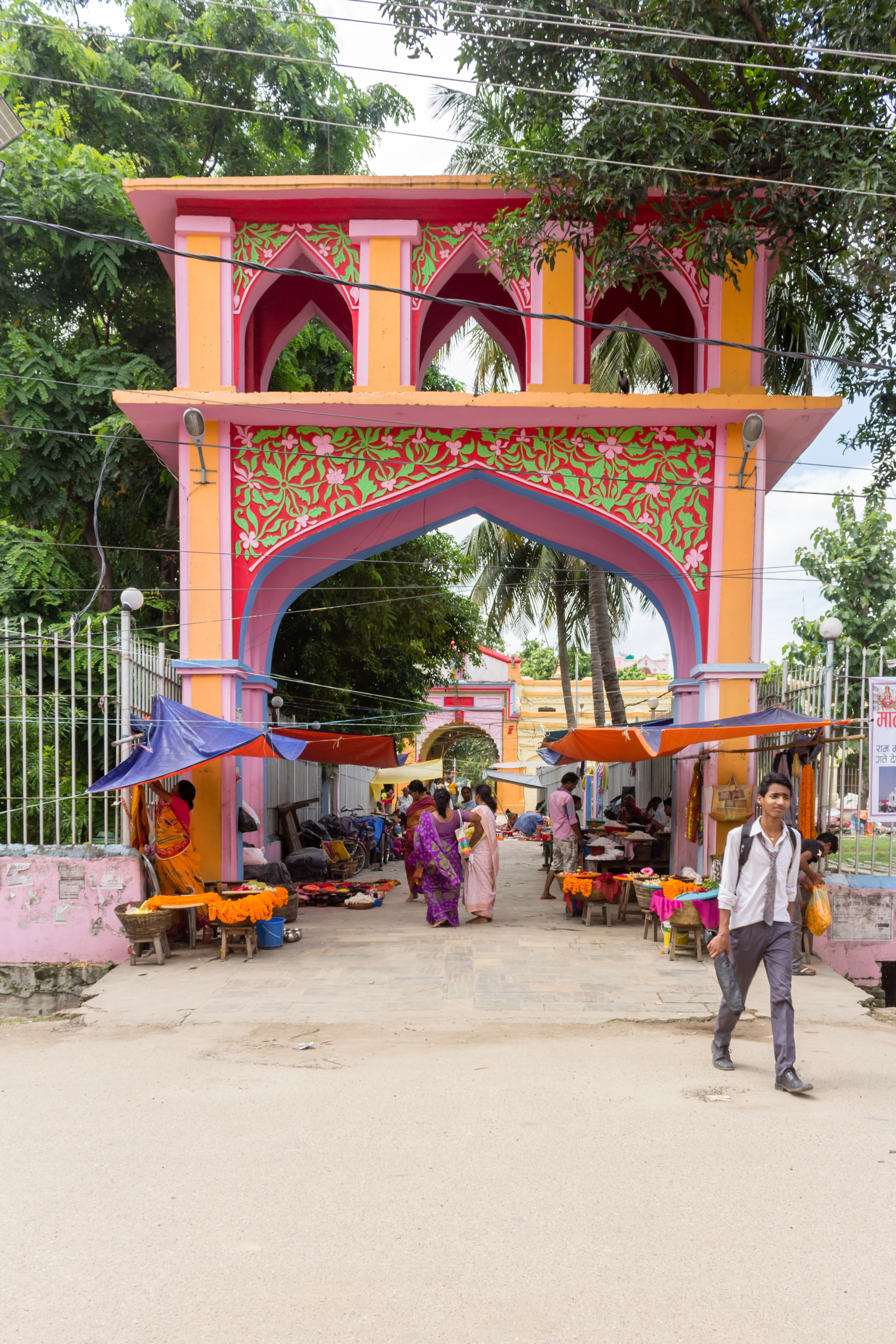
Main Entrance Gate of the complex of Ram Mandir, Janakpur on the west bank of the sacred Dhanush Sagar Lake

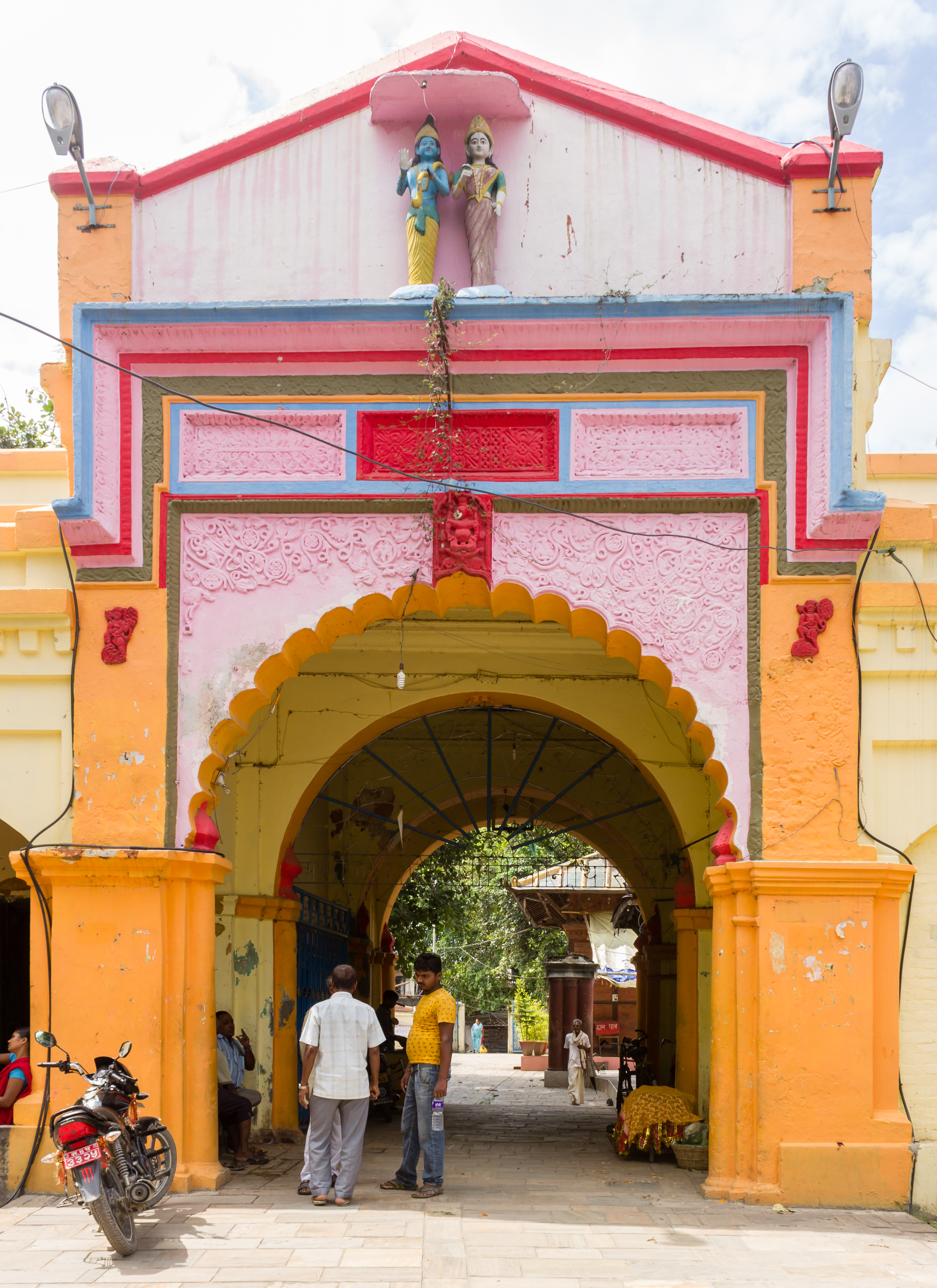
Entrance Gate of Ram Mandir building

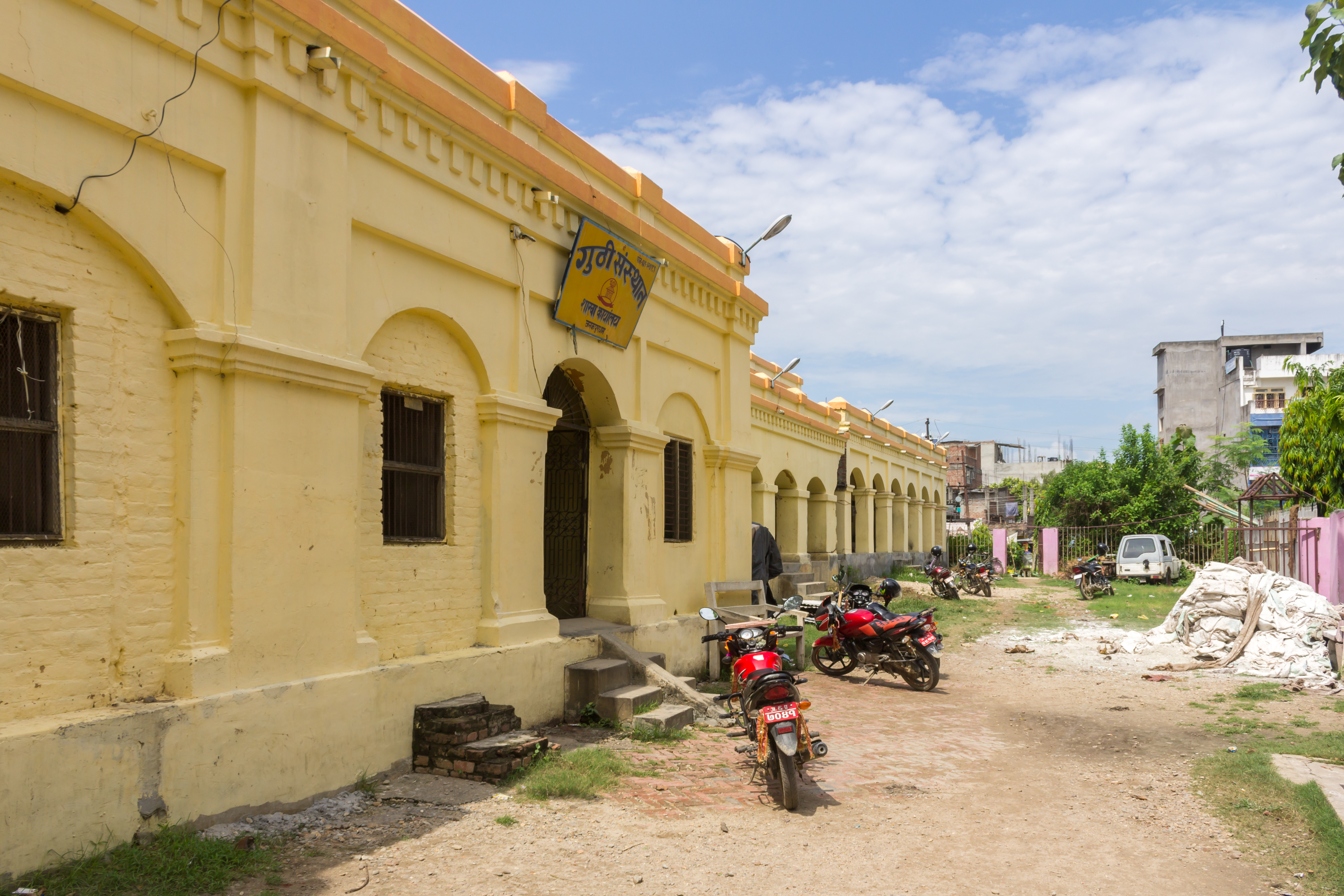
Office of the Guthi Sansthan at the campus of the Ram Mandir.
