= Dhanushsagar =

Religious place of worship, Nepal

Dhanushsagar is a religious place of worship for Hindus where the Patala bhaana of Shiva's bow is housed. The significance of Patala bhaana receives a mention in the Hindu epic Ramayana, wherein Rama during the Sita swayamvara broke the bow of Shiva into three pieces. Akasha bhaana flew to Dhanushkodi in Raameshwaram, bhoomi bhaana housed at Dhanushadham and paatala bhaana creating Dhanushsagar. The bow was visible to devotees until the early 1980s after which it became submerged due to the ever-increasing pollution. The lake is 1 km from the famous Janaki temple of Janakpur (erstwhile Mithila). Janakpur draws its fame as the birthplace of Maharani Sita who was one of the principal deities of Ramayana. Presently the area surrounding the lake is used by road side sellers. There are a few bathing ghats built around the lake for public use. A walk around the lake gives a few glimpses of Maa Gayatri temple and Gangasagar which is colacated with Dhanushsagar.

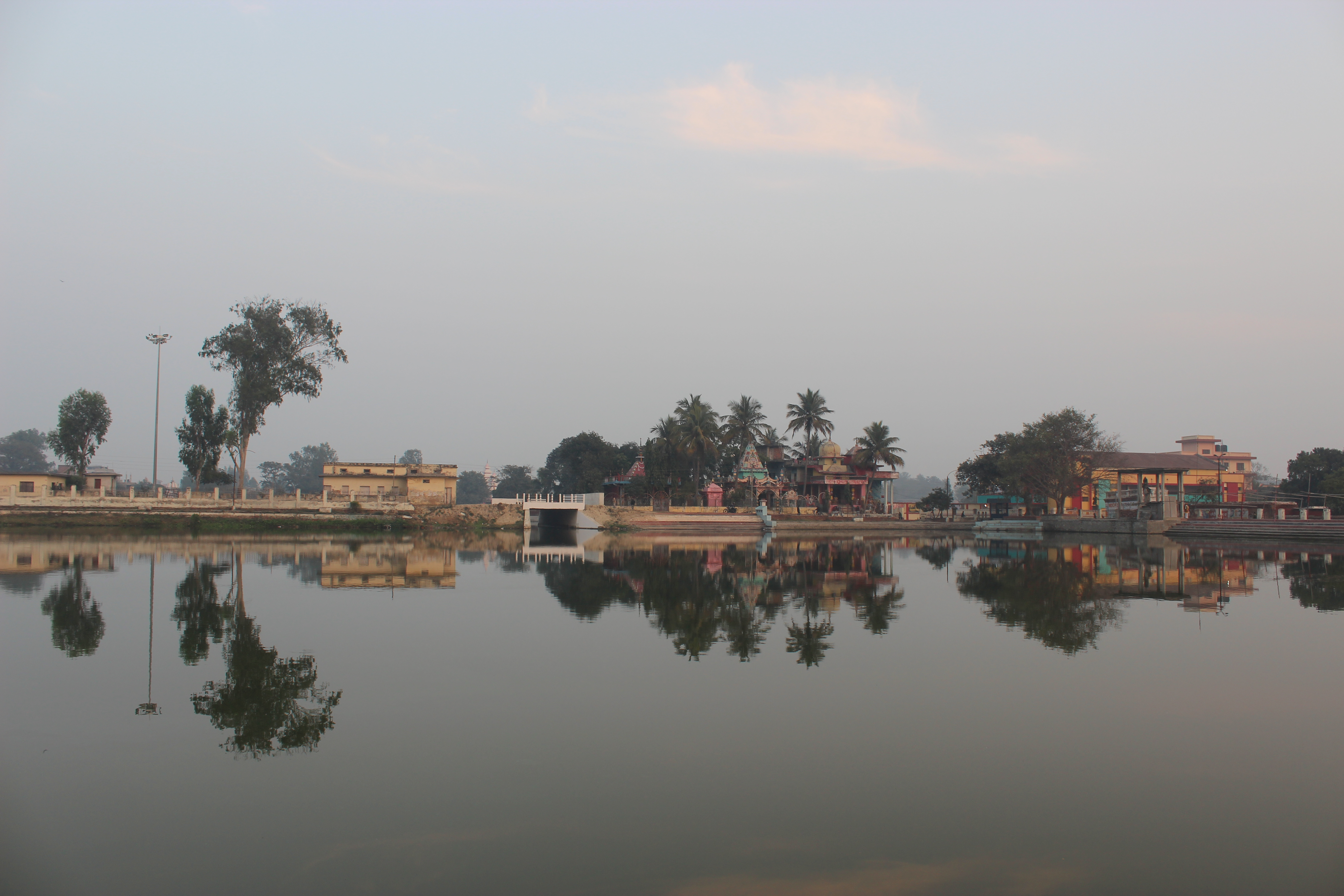
View of the legendary lake Dhanush Sagar in Janakpur

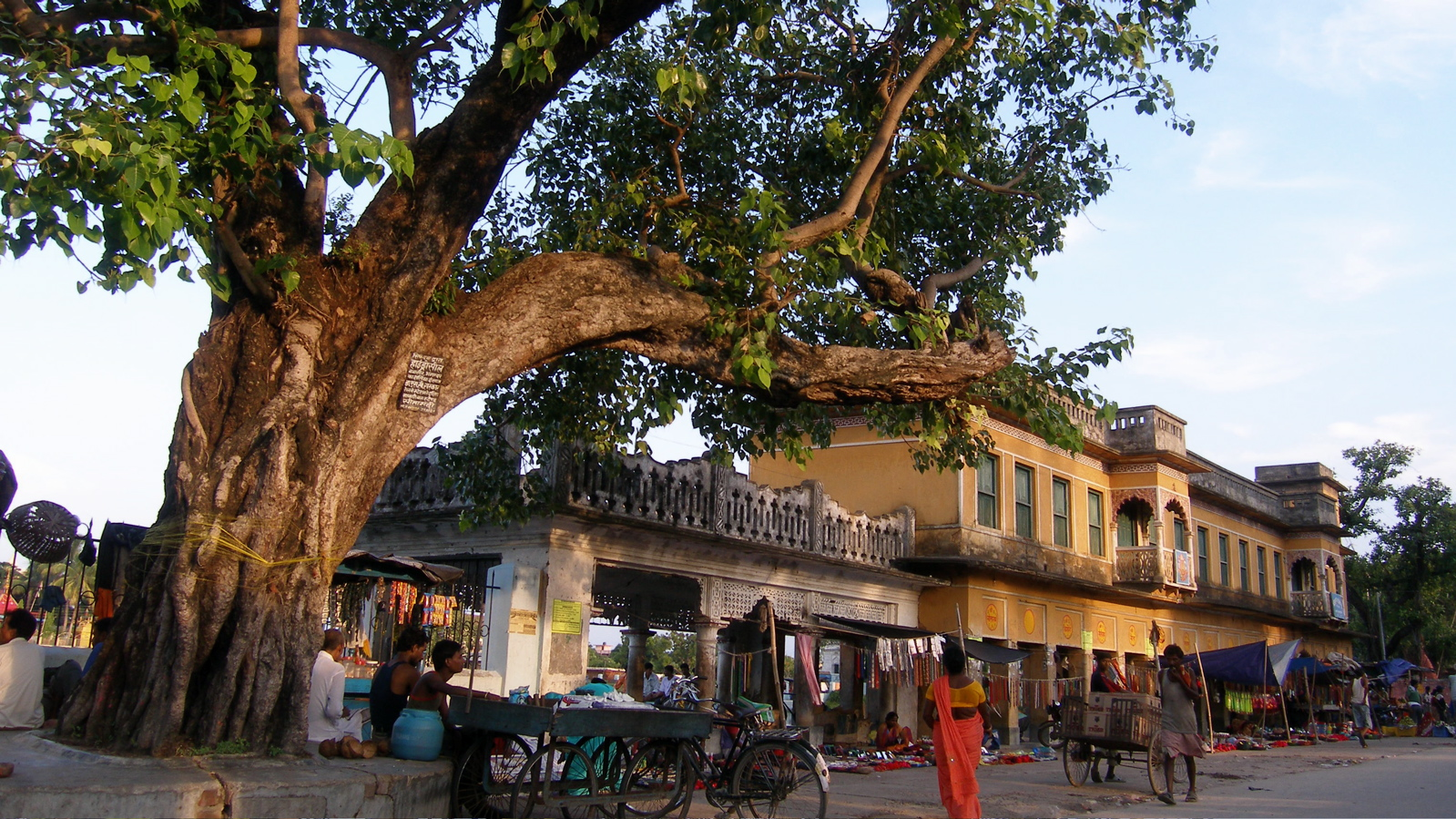
View from Ram Mandir.
