= 2025 Free Student Union election at Tribhuvan University =

Free Student Union elections were held at the Tribhuvan University in Nepal in March-April 2025. Free Student Union elections take place on partisan lines, with the main groups in the 2025 election being the Nepal Student Union (linked to the Nepali Congress), the All Nepal National Free Students Union (linked to the Communist Party of Nepal (Unified Marxist-Leninist)) and the All Nepal National Independent Students Union (Revolutionary) (linked to the Communist Party of Nepal (Maoist Centre)). The electoral process was disrupted at many campuses, due to conflicts between student organisations or internal disputes within student organisations. By the April 3, 2025 deadline more elections had not been held in 15 out of 62 constituent campuses of the university.

== Election system ==
Tribhuvan University had some 390,000 students, with around 162,000 students at constituent campuses and some 230,000 students at affiliated and community colleges. Whilst the university has 1,053 campuses, Free Student Union elections were only scheduled at 462 campuses.

Normally Free Student Union elections should be held every two years. But no nation-wide college election has been held since 2009. At Tribhuvan University a mixed electoral system was introduced in 2017. A mixed election system is used, with the president, secretary, treasurer and some members of the campus Free Students Union working committee are elected through First Past the Post whilst the vice president, joint secretary and some members are elected through Proportional Representation. The number of members of the Free Student Union working committee at each campus depends on the number of students. The upper age limit for candidates is 28 years.

The electoral roll would be published on March 5, 2025. Candidacies would be registered on March 11, 2025.

== Voting and delayed elections ==
The election was held per schedule on March 18, 2025, at 38 constituent campuses as well as some 250 affiliated colleges. The National Human Rights Commission would monitor the election process. The voting was generally peaceful, with some scattered incidents. A voter turn-out of around 65% was reported by the Central Monitoring and Coordination Committee for the Free Student Union election.

Among the 22 constituent campuses were voting could not be held, 11 were located in the Kathmandu Valley. These included large campuses such as the Tribhuvan University Central Campus, Ratna Rajya Lakshmi Campus and Shanker Dev Campus, where student organisations had obstructed the electoral process. The most common cause for postponed elections at the larger campuses were the internal disputes within the Nepal Students Union, due to the conflicts within the mother party Nepali Congress between the factions of Sher Bahadur Deuba and Shekhar Koirala respectively. The Deuba-Koirala factional dispute halted Free Student Union elections at 17 constituent campuses.

In relation to the delays in the holding of elections at many campuses, Tribhuvan University directed that they be held before the April 3, 2025 deadline. Tribhuvan University rector Professor Khagda K.C. stressed that some university exams had been halted due to the election process, and that the elections had interrupted undergraduate and postgraduate studies.

== Organisations contesting ==
25 student organisations contested the election nation-wide, compared to 19 organisations in the 2023 elections;

Organisation	Political affiliation
Note: The identical name 'Akhil Nepal Rastriya Swatantra Bidhyarthi Union' (अखिल नेपाल राष्ट्रिय स्वतन्त्र विद्यार्थी युनियन) is used by many different organisations, but organisations that stem from the tradition of the Communist Party of Nepal (Marxist-Leninist) tend to use the English version 'All Nepal National Free Students Union' and the Nepali abbreviation 'Aneraswabiyu' (अनेरास्ववियु) whilst the organisations that stem from the tradition of the Communist Party of Nepal (Fourth Convention) tend to use English version 'All Nepal National Independent Students Union' and the Nepali abbreviation 'Akhil' (अखिल).
Academic Student Council Nepal	
All Nepal National Free Students Union	Communist Party of Nepal (Unified Marxist-Leninist)
All Nepal National Free Students Union (Fifth)	Communist Party of Nepal (Marxist–Leninist)
All Nepal National Free Students Union (Unified Socialist)	Communist Party of Nepal (Unified Socialist)
All Nepal National Independent Students Union (Revolutionary)	Communist Party of Nepal (Maoist Centre)
All Nepal National Independent Students Union (Revolutionary) Majority	Communist Party of Nepal (Majority)
All Nepal National Independent Students Union (Revolutionary) Vaidya	Communist Party of Nepal (Revolutionary Maoist)
Akhil Samajbadi	Communist Party of Nepal
All Nepal National Independent Students Union (Sixth)	Rastriya Janamorcha
All Nepal Students Union	Communist Party of Nepal
Democratic Student Union	Loktantrik Samajwadi Party, Nepal
Nagarik Bidhyarthi Samaj	Nagrik Unmukti Party
National Democratic Student Organisation	Rastriya Prajatantra Party
National Democratic Student Organisation, Nepal	Rastriya Prajatantra Party Nepal
National Student Forum	
National Students Union	Nepal Janata Party
Naya Shakti Bidhyarthi Union	
Nepal Bidhyarthi Morcha	Rastriya Janamukti Party
Nepal Revolutionary Students' Union	Nepal Workers Peasants Party
Nepal Student Union	Nepali Congress
Scientific Socialist Students Front	
Scientific Socialist Student Organisation	Scientific Socialist Communist Party, Nepal
Socialist Students Union	People's Socialist Party
Socialist Student Union, Nepal	People's Socialist Party, Nepal
Student Janamat Union	Janamat Party

The highest number of groups competing in the election was recorded at Thakur Ram Multiple Campus in Birgunj, where there were 34 different candidate slates in the fray.

== Results ==
At 82 campuses no election was held, as student organisations settled for consensus candidacies. ANNFSU won the presidential post unopposed at 32 campuses - 8 in Bagmati Province, 7 in Lumbini Province, 7 in Sudurpaschim Province, 4 in Koshi Province, 3 in Gandaki Province and 3 in Karnali Province. NSU won the presidency unopposed at 28 campuses and ANNISU(R) at 21 campuses. For ANNFSU At Manahari Multiple Campus in Makwanpur the candidate of the CPN(Unified Socialist)-linked ANNFSU was elected unopposed to the presidency.

As of March 22, 2025, per the university administration, elections were still pending at 21 constituent campuses and 140 affiliated colleges. As of March 23, 2025 NSU claimed that have won 115 affiliated colleges, ANNFSU claimed 103 affiliated colleges whilst ANNISU(R) claimed 85 affiliated colleges. At Garamani Campus in Birtamod, which had the smallest electorate its district with only 90 eligible voters, the National Democratic Student Organisation won the presidency with 23 votes against 8 votes for NSU and 6 votes for ANNFSU.

As of the April 3, 2025 Free Student Union working committees had been elected in 47 out of 62 constituent campuses. The Central Monitoring and Coordination Committee for the elections stated that electoral process would only resume if instructed by court order, otherwise no election would take place until the end of the two-year tenure. At Nepal Law College the election was held on April 21, 2025.

Reacting to the election result, Communist Party of Nepal (Maoist Centre) leader Pushpa Kamal Dahal (Prachanda) stated that "[t]he results achieved across the country, including the defeats of student organizations supported by the ruling coalition in many campuses, have further confirmed that today's conscious and intellectual youth are with us in our campaign against corruption and injustice."

=== Results at Constituent Campuses ===
Campus	Municipality	District	Province	Winner	Free Student Union election
Bhaktapur Multiple Campus	Bhaktapur	Bhaktapur	Bagmati	NSU	NSU candidate Pukar Purajuli won the presidency. NSU and ANNFSU had formed a Joint Panel to confront the Nepal Revolutionary Students Union, as they had done two years earlier. Clashes broke out during the counting of votes.
Sanothimi Campus	Madhyapur Thimi	Bhaktapur	Bagmati	ANNISU(R)	ANNISU(R) candidate Narendra Singh Thagunna elected president. ANNISU(R) and NSU had coordination ahead of the polls at the campus.
Birendra Multiple Campus	Bharatpur	Chitwan	Bagmati		Election postponed. Lockdown by small student organisation.
Chitwan Engineering Campus	Bharatpur	Chitwan	Bagmati	Ind.	Independent candidate Prajwal Adhikari won the presidency, but would go on to join ANNISU(R). His affiliation to ANNISU(R) was formalized at a post-election event attended by CPN(Maoist Centre) leader Pushpa Kamal Dahal and Bharatpur mayor Renu Dahal.
Rampur Agriculture Campus	Khairahani	Chitwan	Bagmati		Election postponed. Lockdown by ANNFSU and others. Dispute erupted during registration of candidates.
Amrit Science Campus	Kathmandu	Kathmandu	Bagmati	ANNFSU	ANNFSU panel won the election at Amrit Science Campus. Election had been postponed in last minute, as ANNISU(R) padlocked the campus. The acting campus chief Hom Bahadur Baniya issued a notice postponing the ballot due to security concerns, as some student organizations had not taken part in a joint meeting the on March 17, 2025. 1,291 out of 1,948 eligible voters participated in the ballot held on March 23, 2025. ANNFSU candidate Rudrahari Porkhel won the presidency by a margin of 326 votes. The runner-up for the presidency represented ANNISU(R), NSU was also in the fray.
Bishwo Bhasha Campus	Kathmandu	Kathmandu	Bagmati		Election postponed. There was a conflict between NSU and ANNISU(R) at the campus. Lockdown by ANNISU(R).
Lalitkala Campus	Kathmandu	Kathmandu	Bagmati	ANNFSU	ANNFSU candidate Ashish Poudel won the presidency.
Mahendra Ratna Campus	Kathmandu	Kathmandu	Bagmati	ANNFSU	ANNFSU candidate Ishwar Thapa won the presidency.
Nepal Commerce Campus	Kathmandu	Kathmandu	Bagmati	ANNFSU	ANNFSU candidate Bishal Rokaha won the presidency.
Nepal Law Campus	Kathmandu	Kathmandu	Bagmati	ANNFSU	ANNFSU candidate Samir Rijal won the presidency. 13 slates contested the election. Mohammad Majid Pravez contested as the presidential candidate of NSU. ANNFSU and ANNISU(R) contested jointly, with ANNFSU contesting the post of president and ANNISU(R) the post of secretary. The ANNFSU-ANNISU(R) joint panel contested on the slogan of '24 months, 24 guarantees'. Election had been postponed to April 2, 2025, as controversy arose over the voters list, with accusations of fake voters having been registered. ANNFSU and ANNISU(R) obstructed the election. NSU conducted a hunger strike at the campus demanding the holding of the election. NSU filed a petition at the Patan High Court, and the court ordered elections to be held. Voting took place on April 21, 2025, with a total of 1,653 votes being cast. But whilst ANNFSU won the presidency, NSU won the posts of secretary and treasurer. The ANNFSU presidential candidate Rijal got 871 votes, NSU presidential candidate Pravez 757 votes and the Scientific Socialist Student Organisation presidential candidate 17 votes. But whilst ANNFSU won the presidency, NSU won the posts of secretary and treasurer. In the Proportional Representation vote the slate of NSU got 622 votes, ANNFSU 560 votes, ANNISU(R) 266 votes, Socialist Students Union Nepal 147 votes and the Scientific Socialist Students Organisation 50 votes.
Maharajgunj Medical Campus	Kathmandu	Kathmandu	Bagmati	NSU	NSU candidate Vivek Kumar Yadav won the presidency.
Maharajgunj Nursing Campus	Kathmandu	Kathmandu	Bagmati	NSU	NSU candidate Bindu Pokhrel won the presidency. Pokhrel obtained 259 votes, just one more vote than the ANNFSU contender. ANNFSU rejected the declaration of NSU as winner. ANNFSU had won the election at the campus in the past two elections.
Padma Kanya Multiple Campus	Kathmandu	Kathmandu	Bagmati	Ind.	Independent candidate Bhupeshwari Air (Bhupi) won the presidency, her panel candidates also won the posts of secretary and treasurer. Election was delayed due internal conflict in NSU. Air was a NSU member but contested against the official NSU candidate Purnimaya Pariyar. Air was seen as supported by Nepali Congress general secretary Gagan Thapa whilst Pariyar was supported by Nepali Congress president Sher Bahadur Deuba. Air got 730 votes, Pariyar 379 votes.
Public Administration Campus	Kathmandu	Kathmandu	Bagmati	ANNISU(R)	ANNISU(R) candidate Aniket Tiwari won the presidency. ANNISU(R) and NSU had coordination ahead of the polls at the campus.
Public Youth Campus	Kathmandu	Kathmandu	Bagmati		Election postponed. The campus was padlocked by ANNISU(R), arguing that NSU and ANNFSU had set up fake voters.
Ratna Rajya Lakshmi Campus	Kathmandu	Kathmandu	Bagmati		Election postponed in last minute. At midnight March 17, 2025 ANNFSU padlocked the campus, protesting that the campus administration had issued fake ID cards in order to influence the election. An all-party meeting agreed to hold elections on March 29, 2025. There were 5,147 eligible voters at the campus. On April 3, 2025, NSU presidential candidate Bindraj Joshi presented a writ petition against Tribhuvan University and the campus administration to court, demanding the holding of elections at the campus. On April 18, 2025, the Patan High Court ordered elections to be held as soon as possible.
Saraswati Campus	Kathmandu	Kathmandu	Bagmati		Election postponed. The ANNFSU linked to the CPN(Unified Socialist) obstructed the election, arguing that voter and candidate registrations have been done in timely manner.
Shanker Dev Campus	Kathmandu	Kathmandu	Bagmati		Election postponed. NSU obstructed the election, arguing that rules were violated when enrolling undergraduate students. On March 17, 2025, chairs were vandalised, during protest.
Thapathali Campus	Kathmandu	Kathmandu	Bagmati	NSU	NSU candidate Pralhad Khadka won the presidency.
Tri-Chandra Multiple Campus	Kathmandu	Kathmandu	Bagmati	NSU	NSU candidate Gobind Koirala won the presidency. Election had been postponed. A seven-party bloc, including ANNISU(R) and ANNFSU, had been formed to contest against the NSU at the campus. A dissident NSU candidate, Vivek Baniya, padlocked the campus - provoking postponing the election. Voting began on April 1, 2025. NSU candidate Koirala won the presidency with 1,215 votes out of 2,671 votes cast, followed by independent candidate Sagar Neupane (683 votes) and ANNFSU candidate Pramit Bista (431 votes). Koirala's election marked the return of the NSU to head the Tri-Chandra Multiple Campus FSU after 16 years in opposition.
Ayurveda Campus	Kirtipur	Kathmandu	Bagmati	NSU	NSU candidate Nishan Aryal won the presidency.
University Campus	Kirtipur	Kathmandu	Bagmati	NSU	NSU candidate Deepakraj Joshi won the presidential post. Election postponed due to a dispute between NSU factions. At University Campus a 21-member FSU would be elected, 11 members elected through First Past the Post and 10 members elected through Proportional Representation. There were 17 candidates for the FSU presidential post at the campus. ANNFSU nominated Siddhant Bhatta, the incumbent FSU secretary, as its candidate for the presidency at the University Campus on February 27, 2025. ANNISU(R) fielded Prabin Dahal as its presidential candidate. The NSU Tribhuvan University Committee had presented Anoj Karki as its candidate for the campus presidency, whilst the NSU central organisation presented Deepak Raj Joshi as the NSU candidate. The Election Committee consulted the NSU centre as to whom was the genuine candidate and thus recognized Joshi's candidature, a move that provoked padlocking of the campus by the NSU Tribhuvan University Committee president Bishnu Badaila. After the NSU faction lifted the padlocking of the campus the election was postponed to March 22, 2025, but was further delayed due to a writ petition by Badaila and other at the Patan High Court. Election was held on March 31, 2025. 3,118 students out of 6,146 eligible voters voted in the election. Deepakraj Joshi of NSU got 789 votes in the election for president, the ANNFSU candidate 781 votes, ANNISU(R) candidate got 727 votes, independent Ujjwal Khadka got 517 votes and Padma Bhusal 166 votes.
Patan Multiple Campus	Lalitpur	Lalitpur	Bagmati		Election was interrupted on March 18, 2025, as ANNISU(R) and ANNFSU raised allegations of fake voters and inconsistencies over voter IDs erupted. A scuffle between NSU and ANNFSU members broke out on the polling day. ANNISU(R) would later organize a relay hunger strike, demanding the holding of elections.
Pulchowk Engineering Campus	Lalitpur	Lalitpur	Bagmati	Ind.	Independent candidate Swayam Shrestha elected president.
Hetauda (Forestry) Campus	Hetauda	Makwanpur	Bagmati	NSU	NSU candidate Shyamraj Bhatta won the presidency.
Dhawalagiri Multiple Campus	Baglung	Baglung	Gandaki	ANNFSU	ANNFSU candidate Ashmim Sheikh won the presidency. Sheikh was supported by ANNISU(R), ANNISU(6th), ANNFSU (Unified Socialist) and National Democratic Student Organisation. Sheikh obtained 552 votes against 491 votes for the NSU candidate. NSU won most of the other seats though, including the posts of secretary and treasurer.
Gorkha Campus	Gorkha	Gorkha	Gandaki	ANNISU(R)	ANNISU(R) candidate Sulabh Amgain won the presidency. An electoral alliance was formed between NSU and ANNFSU, seeking to dislodge the ANNISU(R).
Central (Forestry) Campus	Pokhara	Kaski	Gandaki	ANNFSU	ANNFSU candidate Abhishek Sharma won the presidency.
Pashchimanchal Engineering Campus	Pokhara	Kaski	Gandaki	Ind.	Independent candidate Prakash Dhami won the presidency. He was supported by the Biplav group. Dhami, who is a former member of ANNISU(R), defeated the ANNFSU presidential candidate with a margin of 267 votes.
Pokhara Nursing Campus	Pokhara	Kaski	Gandaki	ANNFSU	ANNFSU candidate Pratibha Bhandari won the presidency.
Prithvi Narayan Campus	Pokhara	Kaski	Gandaki	ANNFSU	ANNFSU candidate Bishnu Pokhrel elected president. Elections were postponed to March 23, 2025, due to a printing error in the ballot papers, with the ballots missing the presidential candidate of ANNISU(6th). First the election was postponed to March 19, 2025, but then further delayed to March 23, 2025, as the election committee office was padlocked by ANNISU(6th), Naya Shakti Students Union and the Joint Panel. No FSU election has been held at Prithvi Narayan Campus since 2009. Prithvi Narayan Campus is the largest campus of TU, and since the FSU of Prithvi Narayan Campus has a history of producing prominent political leaders the ballot there is given national attention. The FSU committee to be elected would have 11 First Past the Post seats and 10 Proportional Representation seats. There were eight candidates for the post of president - ANNFSU, ANNISU(R), NSU, ANNISU(6th), Academic Student Council Nepal, Joint Panel and two independents. The Joint Panel was an electoral bloc formed by ANNFSU (Unified Socialist), ANNISU(R) Vaidhya, Akhil Samajbadi and ANNISU(R) Majority. The Joint Panel fielded Santosh Poudel from ANNFSU (Unified Socialist) as its presidential candidate. Nine groups fielded candidates for the proportional representation seats - ANNFSU, ANNISU(R), NSU, ANNISU(6th), ANNISU(R) Vaidhya, ANNFSU (Unified Socialist), Akhil Samajbadi, Academic Student Council Nepal and Naya Shakti Student Union. There were 9,270 eligible voters at the campus, but only 7,404 voter IDs had been issued. 2,896 voters cast their ballots in the First Past the Post election and 2,892 voters took part in the Proportional Representation election. It was the lowest voter turnout in the history of FSU elections at Prithvi Narayan Campus. ANNFSU candidate Bishnu Pokhrel won the presidential election with 1,106 votes, followed by Sushil Neupane of NSU (503 votes), independent candidate Biplav Neupane (469 votes), Navin Adhikari of ANNISU(R) (223 votes), Santosh Poudel of Joint Panel (196 votes), independent candidate Kamal Subedi (99 votes) and Milan Sunar of ANNISU(6th) (28 votes). ANNFSU won the posts of secretary, treasurer and all of the remaining 8 First Past the Post seats. In the election for the 10 Proportional Representation seats, ANNFSU won 4 seats (1,197 votes), NSU 3 seats (690 votes), ANNFSU (Unified Socialist) 1 seat (305 votes), Academic Student Council Nepal 1 seat (145 votes) and ANNISU(R) 1 seat (112 votes).
Lamjung Campus	Sundarbazar	Lamjung	Gandaki	NSU	NSU candidate Asim Basti won the presidency.
Jumla Multiple Campus	Chandannath	Jumla	Karnali	ANNFSU	ANNFSU candidate Lokendra Budha won the presidency.
Surkhet (Education) Campus	Birendranagar	Surkhet	Karnali		Election postponed, due to obstructions by NSU and ANNFSU. On March 19, 2025, ANNFSU vandalised the campus.
Bhojpur Multiple Campus	Bhojpur	Bhojpur	Koshi	ANNISU(R)	ANNISU(R) candidate Sobin Tamang won the presidency. Tamang obtained 253 votes, against 228 votes for a NSU candidate supported by ANNFSU. Tamang was supported by the Socialist Students Union and ANNFSU (Unified Socialist).
Dhankuta Multiple Campus	Dhankuta	Dhankuta	Koshi	ANNFSU	ANNFSU candidate, Yuva Timilsina, elected unanimously to the presidency.
Mahendra Ratna Multiple Campus	Ilam	Ilam	Koshi	ANNFSU	ANNFSU candidate Bishal Karki won the presidency. The election was carried out peacefully. 904 out of 1,574 eligible voters cast their ballots. NSU and ANNFSU formed a joint panel fielding incumbent treasurer Bishal Karki as its presidential candidate. ANNISU(R) fielded Shambu Rai as its presidential candidate.
Mechi Multiple Campus	Bhadrapur	Jhapa	Koshi	NSU	NSU candidate Neelam Karki won the presidency. 11 student organisations took part in the election. There were 2,905 eligible voters. Karki got 826 votes against 540 for the ANNFSU candidate. The NSU candidate for the post of secretary won with 633 votes.
Gaurahadaha Agriculture Campus	Gaurahadaha	Jhapa	Koshi	NSU	NSU candidate Swarnim Adhikari won the presidency. There were 362 eligible voters at the campus. Four student organisation contested the election.
Degree Campus	Biratnagar	Morang	Koshi	ANNISU(R)	ANNISU(R) panel won the election, with Pritam Sah elected president.
Biratnagar Nursing Campus	Biratnagar	Morang	Koshi	ANNISU(R)	ANNISU(R) candidate Rohit Tajpuriya won the presidency.
Mahendra Morang Adarsh Multiple Campus	Biratnagar	Morang	Koshi	ANNISU(R)	ANNISU(R) candidate Rohit Yadav won the presidency at the Mahendra Morang Adarsh Multiple Campus. The campus is seen as a traditional bastion of NSU. Internal turmoil within NSU marred the election. There were 7 candidates for the FSU presidency at the campus, including candidates of both NSU factions. On February 27, 2025, three NSU students belonging to the Shekhar Koirala faction were injured in an attack by the Deuba faction. On March 14, 2025, police arrested six students, including the FSU president, for vandalism at a NSU faction protest at the campus. 2,631 out of 5,984 eligible voters took part in the election. Yadav of ANNISU(R) obtained 1,118 votes against 1,075 votes for Prajwal Bista (Hakku) of the NSU. Anish Bogati of ANNFSU got 232 votes, dissident NSU candidate Yogdaj Dahal 60 votes, Anisha Rai of ANNISU(R) Majority 31 votes, Rupesh Singh of Student Janmat Union 30 votes and Bivas Katuwal of Academic Students Council Nepal 20 votes. However ANNISU(R) did not win any other First Past the Post seats apart from the presidency. NSU won seven posts, including secretary and treasurer. In the election to secretary the NSU candidate got 741 votes against 588 for the Socialist Students Union Nepal. In the election to treasurer the NSU candidate got 893 votes, against 827 votes to the ANNISU(R) candidate. In the election for the Proportional Representation seats NSU got 1,111 votes and the ANNISU(R) got 811 votes. After the results were published, CPN(Maoist Centre) leader Dahal called Yadav to congratulating him, stating that the ANNISU(R) victory was historic as campus ss a traditional Nepali Congress bastion.
Central Campus of Technology	Dharan	Sunsari	Koshi	Ind.	Independent candidate Peshal Raj Karki won the presidency, with the support of ANNISU(R). Karki joined ANNISU(R) after the election.
Mahendra Campus	Dharan	Sunsari	Koshi	NSU	NSU candidate Prasan Rai won the presidency.
Purwanchal Engineering Campus	Dharan	Sunsari	Koshi	NSU	NSU candidate Sagar Basyal won the presidency.
Terhathum Campus	Aathrai	Terhathum District	Koshi		Election postponed.
Mahendra Multiple Campus	Nepalgunj	Banke	Lumbini	ANNFSU	ANNFSU candidate Kesharjung Shah won the presidency.
Nepalgunj Nursing Campus	Nepalgunj	Banke	Lumbini	ANNFSU	ANNFSU candidate Devarchana Adhikari won the presidency.
Mahendra Multiple Campus	Ghorahi	Dang	Lumbini	NSU	NSU candidate for president, Dipesh Kumar DC, elected unopposed.
Tribhuvan Multiple Campus	Tansen	Palpa	Lumbini	ANNISU(R)	ANNISU(R) candidate Minal Gharti Magar won the presidency. Magar obtained 390 out of 1,228 votes cast. A NSU candidate, in alliance with ANNISU(6th), obtained 342 votes. There were also contestants from ANNFSU and ANNFSU (Unified Socialist).
Butwal Multiple Campus	Butwal	Rupandehi	Lumbini		Election postponed. Seven student organizations padlocked the campus on March 9, 2025, protesting irregularities regarding the voters list. On April 17, 2025, Tulsipur Butwal Bench of the High Court ordered elections to be held within 15 days.
Bhairahawa Campus	Siddharthanagar	Rupandehi	Lumbini		Election postponed. On March 2, 2025, five student organisations padlocked the office of the election committee.
Paklihawa Campus	Siddharthanagar	Rupandehi	Lumbini		Election postponed, following padlocking by ANNISU(R) and ANNFSU.
Ramswarup Ramsagar Multiple Campus	Janakpur	Dhanusha	Madhesh		Election delayed.
Birgunj Nursing Campus	Birgunj	Parsa	Madhesh	ANNFSU	ANNFSU candidate Arju Raya won the presidency.
Thakur Ram Multiple Campus	Birgunj	Parsa	Madhesh		Election postponed.
Shree Mahendra Bindeshwori Campus	Bishnupur	Saptari	Madhesh	SSUN	Socialist Students Union, Nepal won the presidency at the campus. There had been 41 candidates for 19 posts (10 First Past the Post, 9 Proportional Representation seats). The Socialist Students Union, Nepal and ANNISU(R) formed an electoral pact, fielding Ranjit Kumar Yadav as its as presidential candidate. NSU and the Democratic Students Union formed another electoral pact, fielding Nitish Kumar Yadav as its presidential candidate. Other candidates for president included Triveni Kumar Yadav of Students Janamat Union, Manisha Kumari Sah from ANNFSU and Vinay Kumar Yadav (Balen). Ranjit Kumar Yadav of Socialist Students Union, Nepal won the presidency, receiving 393 votes. Mahesh Kumar Sah of the Socialist Students Union, Nepal won the post of secretary, obtaining 395 votes. Kanchan Kumar Thakur of ANNISU(R) was elected treasurer, with 410 votes. There were 3,012 eligible voters at the campus.
S.S.M.Y. Multiple Campus	Siraha	Siraha	Madhesh	NSU	NSU candidate Prithvi Kumar Yadav won the presidency, defeating the four other candidates. There were 3,012 eligible voters at the campus.
Dadeldhura Education Campus	Amargadhi	Dadeldhura	Sudurpashchim	NSU	NSU candidate Gaurav Air won the presidency. NSU also won the posts of secretary and treasurer. There were 552 eligible voters at the campus. Air got 184 votes out of a total of 375 votes cast, followed by a Madan Bohara from Joint Panel with 128 votes and Karna Dhami from independent group with 52 votes. Bohara belonged to Nepali Congress (B.P.), and was supported by ANNFSU and ANNISU(R). When inscribing his candidature, Bohara was accompanied by Nepali Congress (B.P.) leaders Karna Bahadur Malla, Karunakar Bhatta and Hari Prasa Bhatta.
Doti Multiple Campus	Dipayal Silgadhi	Doti	Sudurpashchim	NSU	NSU candidate Indra Rana won the presidency. 431 out of 580 eligible voters participated. Rana obtained 221 votes, against 110 for the ANNFSU candidate and 88 votes for a joint ANNISU(R) and ANNFSU (Unified Socialist) candidate. NSU also won the secretary and treasurer posts. In the Proportional Representation vote, NSU got 220 votes, ANNFSU 101 votes, ANNISU(R) 74 votes and ANNFSU (Unified Socialist) 16 votes.
Siddhanath (Science) Campus	Bhimdatta	Kanchanpur	Sudurpashchim		Election obstructed, as student organisations clashed.
