= Institute of Science and Technology, Nepal =

Science and Technological institution in Nepal

Institute of Science and Technology
- विज्ञान तथा प्रविधि अध्ययन संस्थान
- Type: Public
- Established: 1989; 37 years ago
- Parent institution: Tribhuvan University
- Dean: Prof. Dr. Shankar Prasad Koirala
- Location: Kirtipur, Kathmandu, Bagmati, Nepal
- Website: iost.tu.edu.np

The Institute of Science and Technology (IOST) is one of the five technical institutes under Nepal's Tribhuvan University.

IOST offers undergraduate, postgraduate and Ph.D. programs. 14 central departments, 25 constituent campuses, and 91 affiliated colleges, IoST is one of the oldest and largest technical institutes of TU. The institute collaborates with different ministries, national and international organizations, and other universities to foster scientific research activity in the country.

== Academic programmes ==
The Institute of Science and Technology offers undergraduate, postgraduate and doctoral programmes through its central departments, constituent campuses and affiliated colleges.

=== Bachelor's programmes ===
==== General Bachelor of Science ====
The four-year General Bachelor of Science (B.Sc.) programme is offered in the following major subjects:

- Botany
- Chemistry
- Environmental Science
- Geology
- Hydrology and Meteorology
- Mathematics
- Microbiology
- Physics
- Statistics
- Zoology

==== Other bachelor's programmes ====
- Bachelor of Science in Computer Science and Information Technology (B.Sc. CSIT)
- Bachelor of Mathematical Sciences (B.Math.Sc.)
- Bachelor of Science in Nutrition and Dietetics (B.Sc. ND)
- Bachelor of Information Technology (BIT)
- Bachelor of Data Science (BDS)
- Bachelor of Technology in Food Technology (B.Tech. Food)

=== Master's programmes ===
- Master of Science (M.Sc.) in:
  - Computer Science and Information Technology
  - Mathematics
  - Microbiology
  - Environmental Science
  - Statistics
  - Biotechnology
  - Biodiversity and Environmental Management
  - Physics
  - Chemistry
  - Zoology
  - Botany
  - Geology
  - Hydrology and Meteorology
  - Engineering Geology
  - Environmental Health in Disaster
- Master of Technology in Food Technology (M.Tech.)
- Master of Data Science (MDS)
- Master of Information Technology (MIT)
- Master of Mountain and Mountaineering Science (MMS)

=== Research degrees ===
- Master of Philosophy (M.Phil.) in Mathematics
- Doctor of Philosophy (Ph.D.) in:
  - Computer Science and Information Technology
  - Mathematics
  - Microbiology
  - Environmental Science
  - Statistics
  - Biotechnology
  - Physics
  - Chemistry
  - Zoology
  - Botany
  - Geology
  - Hydrology and Meteorology
  - Food Technology

== Central departments ==
- Central Department of Physics, Kirtipur, Kathmandu
- Central Department of Chemistry, Kirtipur, Kathmandu
- Central Department of Botany, Kirtipur, Kathmandu
- Central Department of Zoology, Kirtipur, Kathmandu
- Central Department of Geology, Kirtipur, Kathmandu
- Central Department of Microbiology, Kirtipur, Kathmandu
- Central Department of Environmental Science, Kirtipur, Kathmandu
- Central Department of Mathematics, Kirtipur, Kathmandu
- Central Department of Statistics, Kirtipur, Kathmandu
- Central Department of Biotechnology, Kirtipur, Kathmandu
- Central Department of Computer Science and Information Technology, Kirtipur, Kathmandu
- Central Department of Hydrology and Meteorology, Kirtipur, Kathmandu
- Central Department of Food Technology, Dharan, Sunsari
- School of Mathematical Sciences, Balkhu, Kathmandu

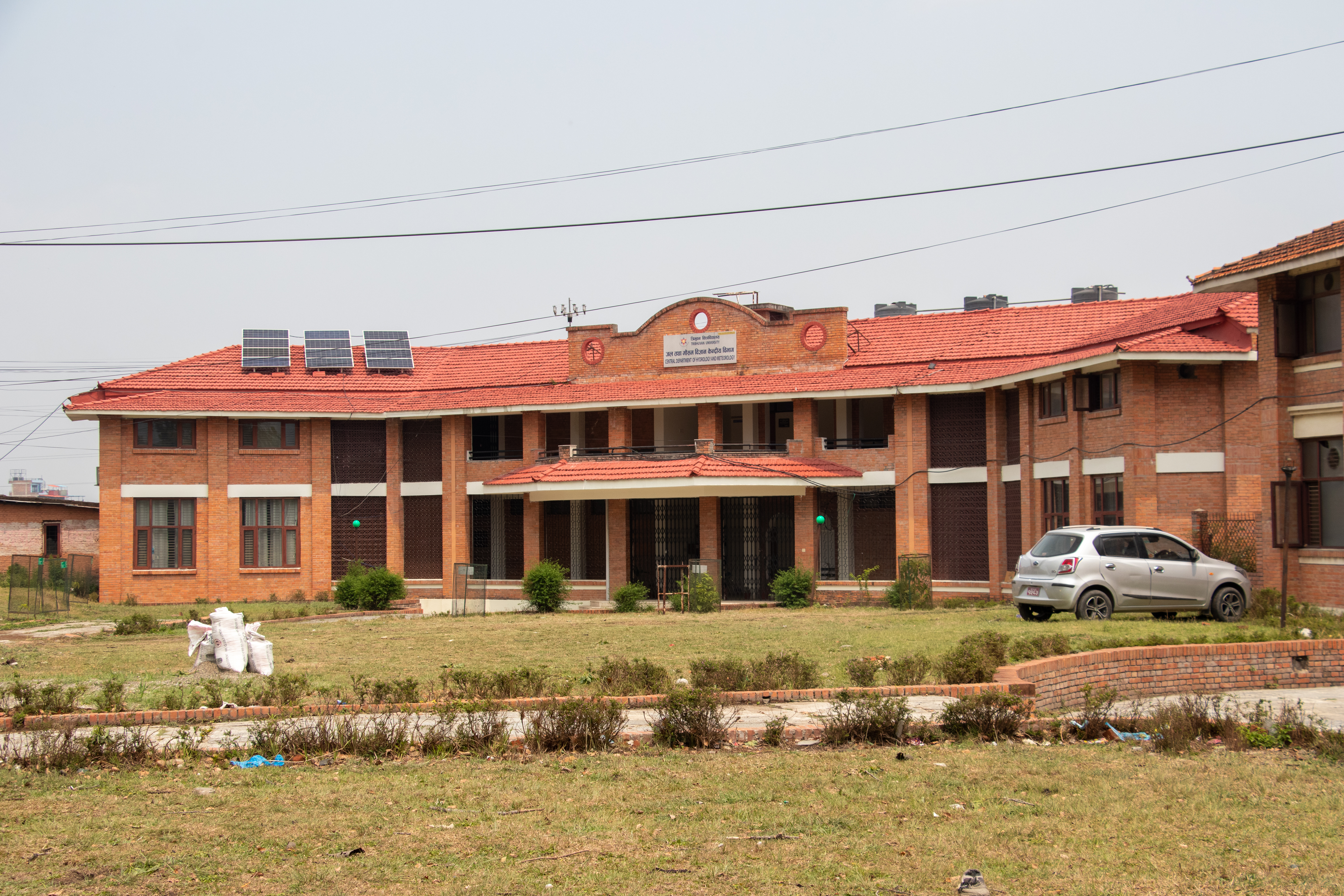
Central Department of Hydrology and Meteorology

== Colleges and campuses ==
=== Constituent campus ===
1. Mechi Multiple Campus
2. Dhankuta Multiple Campus
3. Central Campus of Technology, Dharan
4. Mahendra Morang Adarsh Multiple Campus, Biratnagar
5. Degree Campus, Biratnagar
6. Mahendra Bindeshwori Multiple Campus, Rajbiraj
7. Surya Narayan Satya Na. Mo. Yadav Campus, Siraha
8. Ramswarup Ramsagar Multiple Campus, Janakpur
9. Thakur Ram Multiple Campus, Birgunj
10. Birendra Multiple Campus, Bharatpur
11. Prithivi Narayan Multiple Campus, Pokhara
12. Sidhanath Science Campus, Mahendranagar
13. Mahendra Multiple Campus, Nepalgunj
14. Butwal Multiple Campus, Butwal
15. Tribhuvan Multiple Campus, Palpa
16. Tri-Chandra Multiple Campus, Ghantaghar
17. Amrit Campus, Lainchour
18. Patan Multiple Campus, Patan
19. Bhaktapur Multiple Campus, Bhaktapur
20. Padma Kanya Multiple Campus, Bagbazar
21. Mahendra Multiple Campus, Ghorahi
22. Dhaulagiri Multiple Campus, Baglung
23. Gorkha Campus, Gorkha
24. Bhairahawa Multiple Campus

== Affiliated colleges ==
1. Academia Int. College, Gwarko
2. AIMS College, Biratnagar
3. Aishwarya multiple campus, Dhangadhi
4. Ambikeshowri Information & Technical Campus, Ghorai, Dang
5. Ambition College, Baneshwor
6. Asian School of Management & Technology, Samakhushi
7. Asian College of Higher Studies, Jawalakhal
8. Bake Bageshori College, Nepalgunj
9. Balkumari College, Narayngadh
10. Bharawi Science College, Itahari
11. Birat Kchitize College, Biratnagar
12. Birat Multiple College, Biratnagar
13. Birendra Memorial College, Dharan
14. Canvas International College, Basundhara, kathmandu
15. Chautara Multiple Campus, Chautara
16. Chitwan College of Technology, Bharatpur
17. College of Applied Business & Technology, Gangahity, Chabahil, Kathmandu
18. College of Applied Sciences, Anamnagar
19. D.A.V. College of Management, Jawlakhel, Lalitpur
20. Damak Multiple Campus, Jhapa
21. Deerwalk Institute of Technology, Sifal
22. Dharan Multiple Campus, Dharan
23. Gayndeep College, Tulsipur, Dang
24. Godawari College, Itahari
25. Gokuleshwor Multiple Campus, Darchula
26. Goldengate International College, Purano Baneshwor
27. Hari Khetan Multiple Campus, Birgunj
28. Hetauda City College, Hetauda, Makawanpur
29. Himalaya College of Engineering, Shankhamul
30. Himalaya Darahan College, Biratnagar
31. J.S. Murarka Campus, Lahan
32. Jahari Campus, Rukum
33. Janpriya Multiple College, Pokhara
34. Kailali Multiple Campus, Dhangadi
35. Kamala Science Campus, Sindhuli
36. Kantipur College of Medical Sciences, Sitapaila
37. Karnali Prabidhi Campus, Kalikot, Sipkhana, Karnali
38. Kathford International College of Engineering and Management, Lalitpur
39. Kathmandu Bernhardt College, Bafal
40. Kathmandu College of Science & Technology, Naxal
41. Kathmandu College of Technology, Lokanthali, Bhaktapur
42. Khwopa College, Bhaktapur
43. Lalitpur Valley College, Jawlakhel
44. Lumbini city College, Butawal
45. Lumbini ICT College, Gaidakot, Nawalparasi
46. Madan Bhandari Memoral College,Anamnagar
47. Makwanpur Multiple Campus, Hetauda
48. Manilek Campus, Baitadi
49. Model Multiple College, Janakpur
50. Mt.Annapurna Campus, Pokhara
51. Nagarik College, Gaidakot, Nawalparasi
52. Nagarjuna College of IT, Pulchowk. Lalitpur
53. National College (NIST), Lainchour
54. National College of Computer Studies, Paknajol
55. National College of Food Technology, Lainchour
56. National Infotec College, Birgunj
57. National Multiple College, Bakhundole
58. Nepal Mountain Academy, Thapagaun, Bijulibazar, Kathmandu
59. Nepalaya College, Kalanki
60. Nepalgunj Campus, Nepalgung
61. Nepathya College, Butawal
62. New Horaijan Campus, Butawal
63. New Summit College, Purano Baneshwor
64. Niharika College, Biratnagar
65. Nilgiri College, Itahari
66. NIST College, Banepa
67. Orchid International College, Sinamangal
68. Padmashree International College, Tinkune
69. Padmodaya Campus, Ghorahi, Dang
70. Pinnacal College Lagenkhel, Lagankhel
71. Pokhara College of Science & Technology, Pokhara
72. Prime College, Khusibu
73. Rajarshijanak Campus, Janakpur
74. Sagarmatha College of Science & Technology, Sanepa
75. Sahid Smirti Multiple Campus, Chitawn
76. Sainik Awashiya Mahavidalaya, Bhaktapur
77. Samridhi College, Lokanthali, Bhaktapur
78. Sapta Gandki Multiple Campus, Bharatpur
79. Shreeyantra College, Damak, Jhapa
80. Soch College of I.T., Pokhara
81. Softech College, Lahan
82. St. Lawrence College, Chabhil
83. St. Xaviers College, Maitighar
84. Sukuna Multiple Campus, Morang
85. Sunsari Technical College, Dharan
86. Swastik College, Thimi, Bhaktapur
87. Texas International College, Chabahil
88. Trinity International College, Dillibazar, Kathmandu
89. Vedas College, Jawalakhal
90. Xavier International College, Kalopul

== See also ==
- Institute of Medicine
- Institute of Forestry
- Institute of Engineering
