= Kalidas Shrestha =

Kalidas Shrestha कालिदास श्रेष्ठ
- Born: 23 May 1923; Kathmandu, Kingdom of Nepal (now Nepal)
- Died: 2 March 2016 (aged 92); Blue Cross Hospital, Tripureshwor, Kathmandu, Nepal
- Occupations: Painter, sculptor, arts administrator, social activist
- Years active: 1936–present
- Known for: Chairman of Kamala Memorial Community Service Center, and founder and principal of Nepal Fine Arts College
- Works: The Coronation, The Krishna, King Mahendra
- Spouse: Late. Kamala Maiya Shrestha (m. 1946–1996)
- Children: Ambika, Bishwo, Rajeshor, Bijay, Rekha, Geeta, Meera

Kalidas Shrestha (Nepali: कालिदास श्रेष्ठ; 23 May 1923 – 2 March 2016) was a Nepalese painter, sculptor, arts administrator, and social activist. He the founding chairman of Kamala Memorial Community Service Center; and also founded the Nepal Fine Arts College, where he served as its first principal. Shrestha also served as an honorable member of Nepal Academy (then Royal Nepal Academy).

== Personal life ==
Kalidas Shrestha was born at Kathmandu to father Govinda Das Shrestha and mother Mangal Kumari Shrestha. He was married to Kamala Maiya Joshi, daughter of then Sahu Bekhalal Joshi, until her death in 1996. In 2013, he lived at Nardevi. He has seven children (4 daughters, 3 sons) and many grandchildren. He has also published several books on painting. He is "Shahitya Bisharat" in Nepal Bhasa (Newari).

== Education ==
Shrestha had already started teaching at the age of 13, when he was still enrolled as a student at the Durbar High School, the first school of Nepal. He obtained primary education from Durbar High School. In the year 1944 he completed Kala Pravin. This was the highest level of art education available in Nepal. He then went to Mumbai (then Bombay) and earned a Graduate Diploma in Arts (GDA) degree from the Sir Jamsetjee Jeejebhoy School of Art in 1957 under the Colombo Plan.

== Biography ==
Shrestha was often invited to Rana palaces to teach art to the family members of Rana's. In 1960 he started organizing art exhibitions and encouraging and promoting other Nepalese artists. He also established an art gallery at his home and sold his paintings for 200 to 250 Rupees at that time. Shrestha started to paint Nanglo bamboo trays. He was offered a contract to paint hundred thousand of such Nanglo paintings but refused the offer because "Art is created from heart: to make in mass is not creating but manufacturing".

Soon he was back to promoting Nepalese art and took the initiative to request King Mahendra open a College of Fine Arts in Nepal. He was involved in its establishment in 1967 and for many years took charge. He saved money and invested in the development of the college. His involvement in the development and welfare of the college took most of his time. In 1973 he was appointed as the First Campus Chief of the Fine Art Campus. In this capacity he introduced the importance of Fine Art to the students of other campuses as optional subjects for the Padma Kanya Campus, Ratna Rajya Campus, Saraswati Campus, Public Youth Campus, and Patan Campus.

Shrestha wanted to open Bachelor of Fine Arts (BFA) in fine arts in Nepal. For that, he proposed that a few students who had passed the Intermediate in Fine Arts (IFA) be sent to Banaras and Delhi for further training. He decided to resign from the faculty if his demand was not fulfilled, he expressed. His colleagues supported him. The BFA was introduced in 1982. His goal for art education was not fulfilled, however, as he wanted to upgrade the art education at the level of Master of Fine Arts (MFA). Thus he made many plans for MFA and submitted to then Dean's Office, Ministry of Education, but was rejected.

He was the Founder and Chairman of Kamala Memorial Community Service Center (KMCSC) and Chairman of Arniko Rastriya Yuwa Sewa Kosh. Many articles had been published about his art in Rolla Daily News as well as national and international newspapers. He was honorable member of Nepal Academy, and secretariat of Nepal Kala Samiti. He has travelled in many places of Nepal and in India for the development of Nepalese Arts and was invited to Germany in 1978. He was invited by Mayor of Rolla, Missouri, United States, Joseph Morgan in 2001 and did one solo art exhibition in that country. He was also invited to Sweden in 2003 by the President of the Sweden Svenesk Unifem Committee, Analena Henarikasan and did one solo art exhibition in Sweden that year. Shrestha died on 2 March 2016, in Tripureshwor at the age of 93 after a struggle with kidney disease that led into pneumonia.

== Awards and recognition ==
He has been awarded the Mahendra Pragya Puraskar and honored by King Mahendra Bir Bikram Shah Dev Suva-Rajyabhishek Padak 1957, Jaanpad Sewa Padak 1966, Dirgha Sewa Padak, King Birendra Bir Bikram Shah Dev Suva-Rajyabhishek Padak 1974, King Birendra Bir Bikram Shah Dev Gaddhi Aarohan Padak 1996, Second Prize winner in Nepal Udyog Pradarsani Cash, Prize in Third convention (1939), Prize in Third convention (1943), and many national and international medals.

Shrestha, along with artist Uttam Nepali and sculptor Thakur Prasad Mainali, were honoured by Parashu Narayan Chaudhary, Chairman of Rajsabha Standing Committee, at a function organised by Lalitkala Critics' Society. Shrestha also received Saraswati Samman, delivered by Lunakarandas Gangadevi Chaudhary Kala Sahitya Mandir on 3 August 2008.
