= Ratna Rajya Laxmi Campus =

Public college in Kathmandu, Nepal

- रत्न राज्यलक्ष्मी क्याम्पस
- Type: Public College
- Established: August 20, 1961; 65 years ago
- Parent institution: Tribhuvan University
- Chairperson: Jivandhar Jnawali
- Location: Pradarsani Marg, Kathmandu, Nepal; 27.7025688°N 85.3198414°E
- Campus: 1.0056 acres (0.4070 ha); Urban
- Website: rrlc.tu.edu.np

Ratna Rajya Laxmi Campus (Nepali: रत्न राज्यलक्ष्मी क्याम्पस), commonly known as RR Campus, is a constituent college of Tribhuvan University. It is also the largest college for the Humanities and Social Sciences studies. It provides under-graduate and master's degree level programs. The college was named after Queen Ratna Rajya Lakshmi Devi Shah, second wife of the then King Mahendra Bir Bikram Shah Dev.

== Notable people ==
- Aaryan Sigdel, Nepalese actor
- Astalaxmi Shakya, Nepalese politician
- Bipin Karki, Nepalese actor
- Bhuwan Dhungana, Nepalese poet and writer
- Buddhisagar, Nepalese writer and poet
- Mala Rajya Laxmi Shah, Indian politician
- Neeta Dhungana, Nepalese actress
- Om Sunar, Nepalese inger
- Pratik Himal Rai, Nepalese singer-songwriter
- Sulochana Manandhar, Nepalese poet, writer
- Swapnil Smriti, Nepalese writer
- Udit Narayan, Indian singer

== Gallery ==
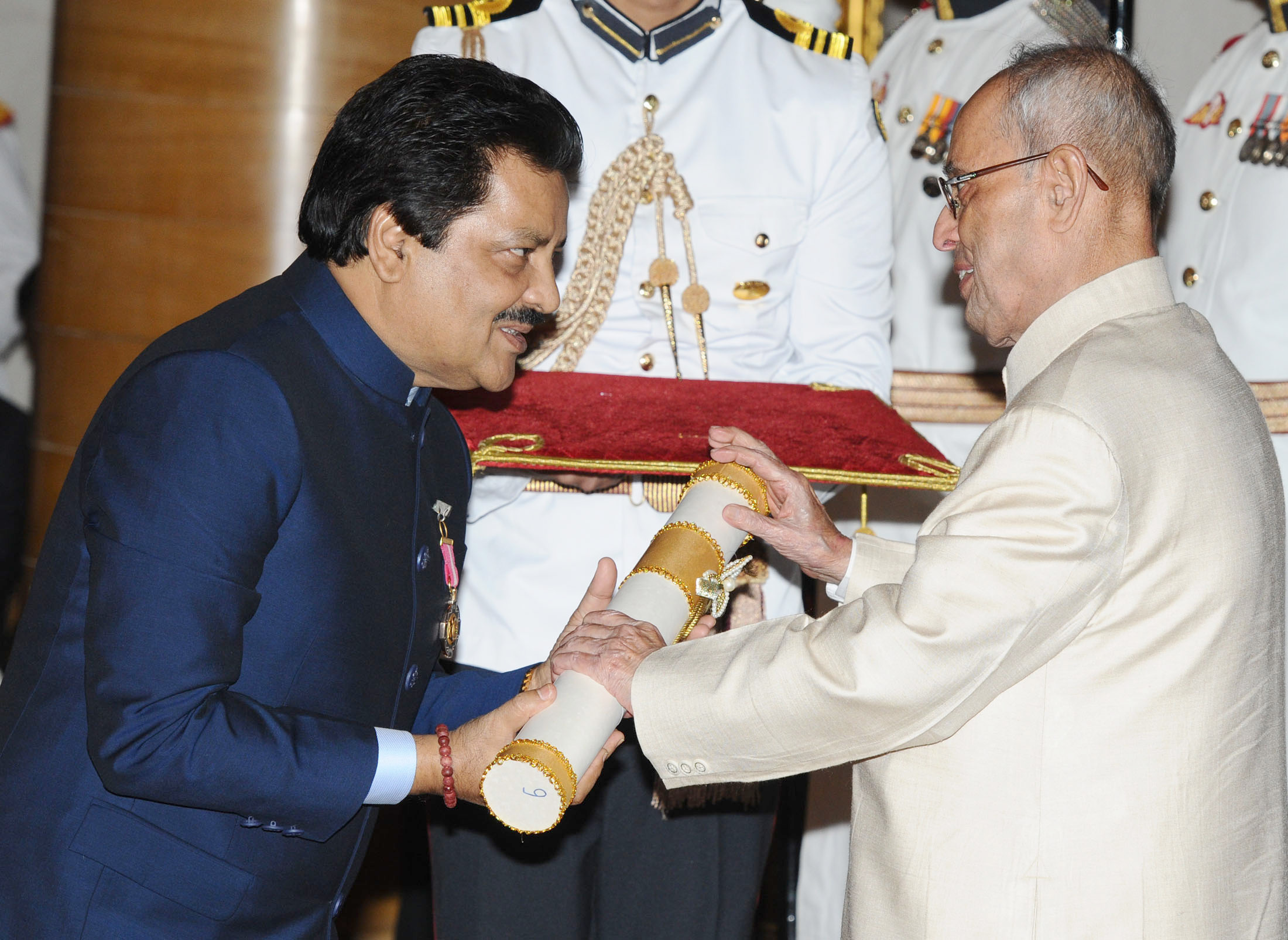
Udit Narayan, an alumni received Padma Bhushan award from the president of India, Pranab Mukherjee

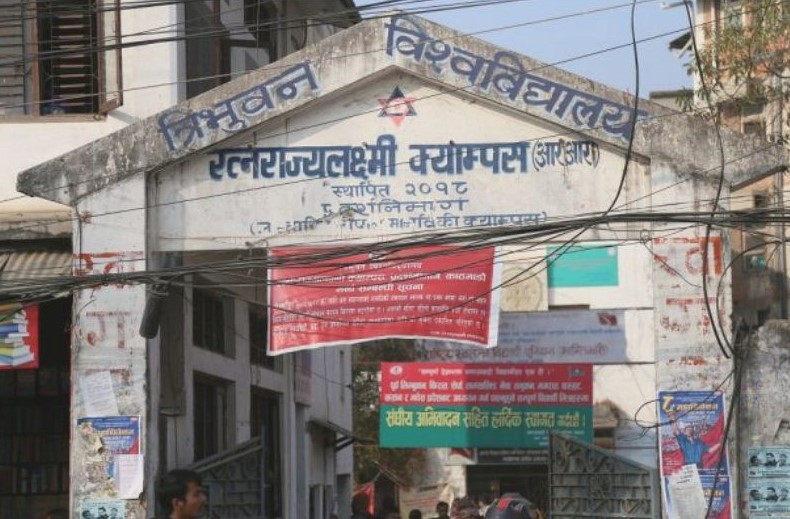
Entrance of the campus

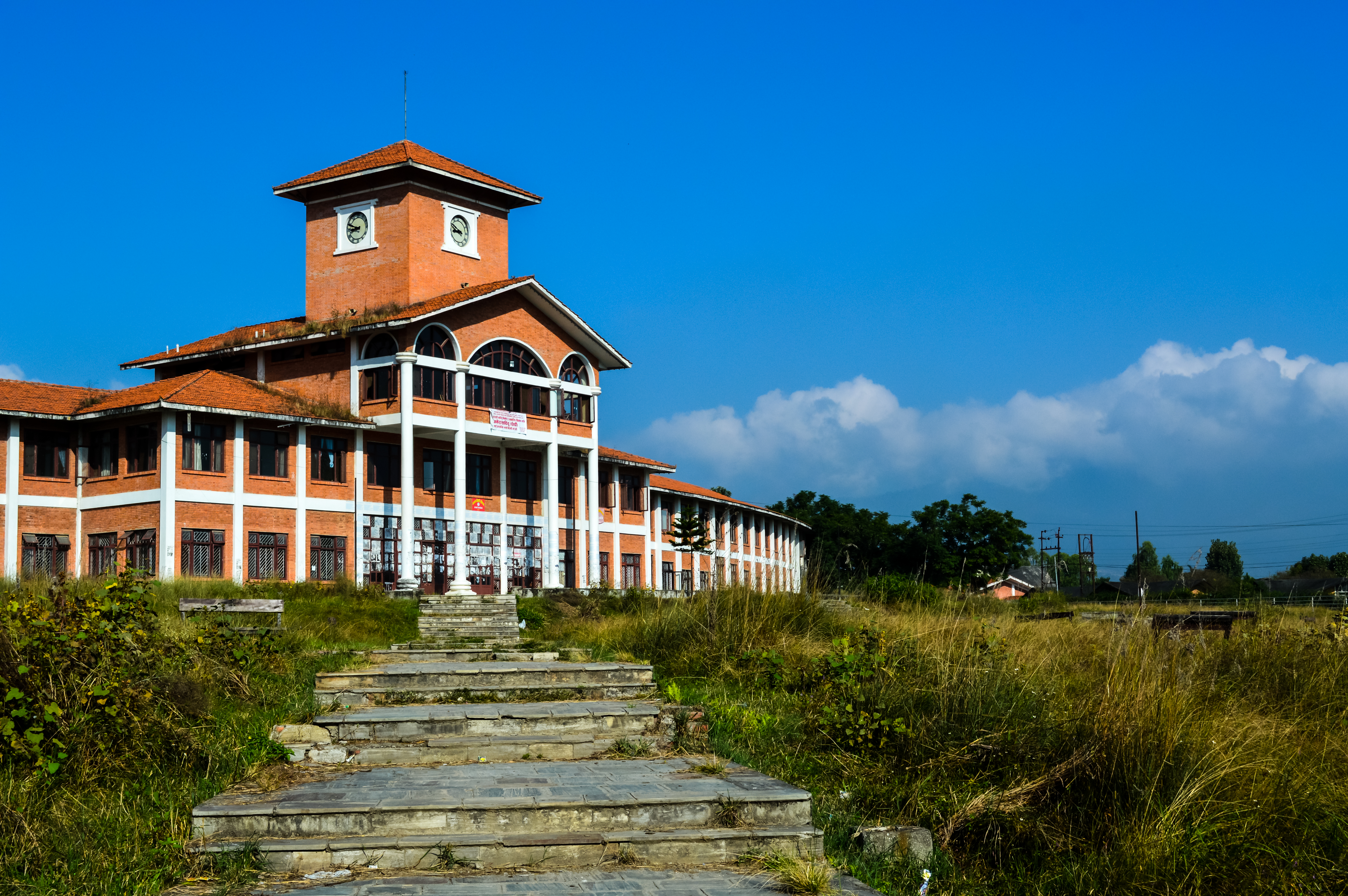
Tribhuvan University, parent university of the campus

== See also ==
- Pulchowk Campus
- Tribhuvan University
- Nepal Law Campus
- Shanker Dev Campus
- Institute of Medicine, Nepal
- Padma Kanya Multiple Campus
- Amrit Campus
- Ayurveda Campus, Kirtipur
