= Kathmandu Model College =

Private college

- काठमाडौं मोडल कलेज
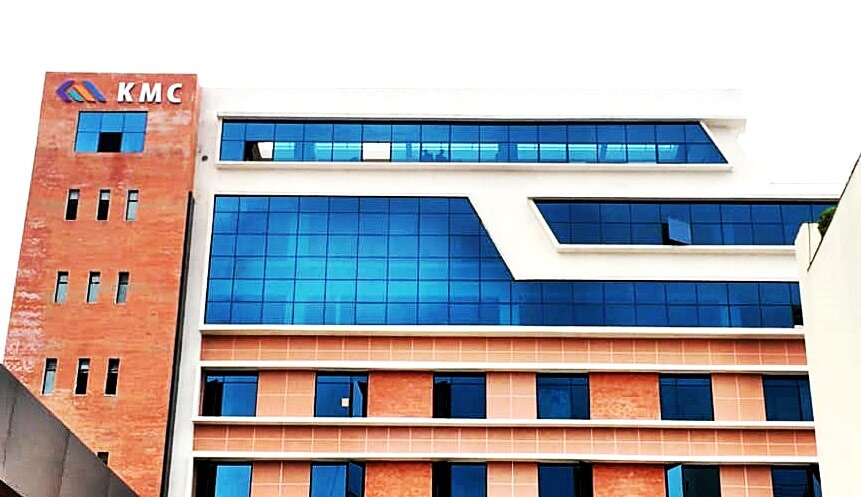
- Motto in English: Academic Excellence through Quality Education
- Type: Private
- Established: 2000
- Accreditation: University Grants Commission
- Affiliations: Tribhuvan University
- Chairman: Rameshwor Aryal
- Principal: Nagendra Aryal
- Students: 2000+
- Location: Bagbazar, Kathmandu, Bagmati, Nepal; 27.70748°N 85.31996°E
- Campus: Urban
- Language: English, Nepali

Kathmandu Model College (also known as KMC) is a private college located in Bagabazar, Kathmandu, affiliated to Tribhuvan University. It is accredited and QAA certified by University Grants Commission, Nepal.

KMC offers Information technology, Management and Social Work courses at the undergraduate and postgraduate level awarded by Tribhuvan University.

== History ==
Kathmandu Model College (KMC) was founded in 2000 in Bagbazar, Kathmandu, by a team of academicians and entrepreneurs. It started by offering intermediate courses in science, humanities and law. In 2003, it started offering Business Studies, Computing and Social Work graduate and post graduate programs affiliated to Tribhuvan University.

== Awards ==
KMC was awarded the best private college in Kathmandu by the Government of Nepal on the occasion of National Education Day, 2080 in Kathmandu on September 29, 2023. It was honoured for its performance, based on evaluations conducted by the University Grants Commission (UGC).
