= Doti Multiple Campus =

Campus of Tribhuwan University in Nepal

Snatakottar Campus
- स्नातकोत्तर क्याम्पस
- Established: 2017 BS
- Parent institution: Tribhuwan University
- Location: Doti district, Nepal
- Website: domc.tu.edu.np

Doti Multiple Campus (Nepali: डोटी बहुमुखी क्याम्पस) is one of the constituent campuses of Tribhuvan University located in Doti district of western Nepal. The campus was established in 1961(2017 BS). It is recognized by University Grants Commission (Nepal)

Bachelor and Master level courses are offerend in this campus in the field of arts, management and sociology.

== Infrastructure ==
The campus has a library, canteen and a sports ground.
