= Om Sunar =

Nepali playback singer

- ओम सुनार
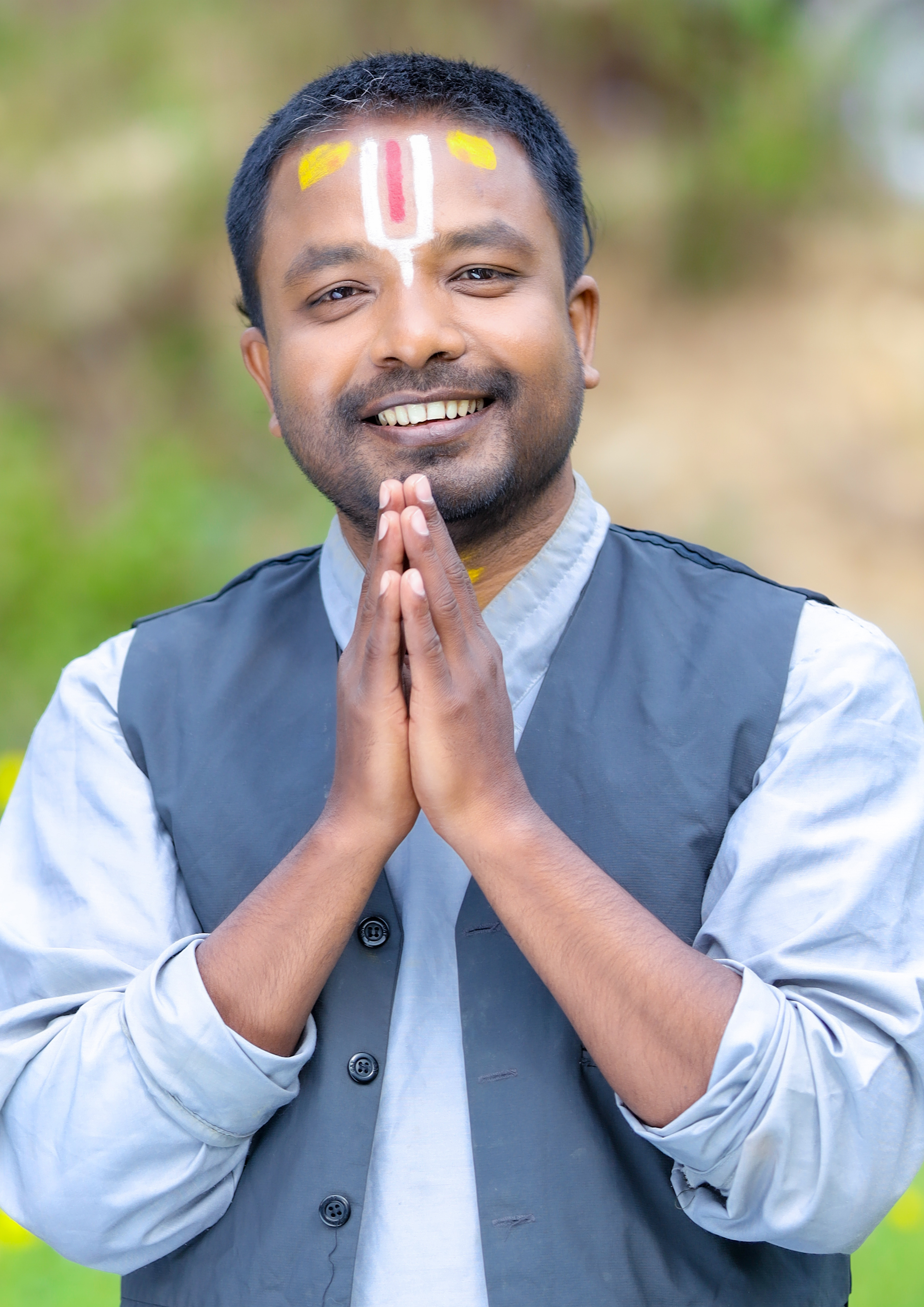
- Om Sunar
- Born: March 16, 1987 (age 39); Surkhet, Nepal
- Occupations: Singer; Composer; Music producer
- Years active: 2000–present
- Musical career
- Origin: Nepal
- Genres: Classical; Folk; Playback
- Website: omsunar.com

Om Sunar (Nepali: ओम सुनार) is a Nepali playback singer known for his work in Nepali folk and Indian classical music. He began his musical career in 2009 and has recorded over 250 songs. He holds a Bachelor's degree in Music from the Faculty of Humanities and Social Sciences at Tribhuvan University and as of 2024, is pursuing his master's degree at the same institution.

== Musical career ==
Om Sunar began his musical journey with the debut song "Maga Maga Timi Ke Magchhau Dinchhu Timi Lai Je Magchhau" from the album Sugandha. Since then, he has released a wide range of recordings in both Nepali and Hindi.

He has composed more than three dozen of songs for Nepali films and audio albums. He made his playback singing debut in the Nepali film Don't Break My Heart, which marked his entry into the film music industry.

In recognition of his contributions to music and cultural preservation, Sunar currently serves as the President of the Music Research and Development Forum Nepal (MRDF Nepal). He is an honorary member of the Film Artist Workers Organization of Nepal (FAWON), and Music Video Directors Guild of Nepal. He has served as a judge in various national and international programs.

== Early life and education ==
Om Sunar was born on March 16, 1987, in Surkhet District, Nepal, to Chandra Bahadur Sunar and Jagmati Sunar. In April 1991 (Baisakh 2048 B.S.), he moved with his family to Kailali District in Sudurpashchim Province, where he has resided permanently ever since.

He completed his SLC in 2005, and his Higher Secondary Education in 2009 from Shree Rastriya Higher Secondary School Kailali. In the same year, he completed Community Medical Assistant (CMA) program through the CTEVT.

In 2009, Sunar began formal training in Indian classical music under the mentorship of his music teacher Gurudeb Kamat. He earned a Bachelor of Arts (B.A.) in Music in 2022 from Ratna Rajya Laxmi Campus, under the Faculty of Humanities and Social Sciences at Tribhuvan University. He is currently pursuing a Master of Arts (M.A.) in Sociology at the same institution.

== Personal life ==
Om Sunar is married to Muna Shah, who is also active in the Nepali music industry as a folk singer and lyricist. They were married on December 13, 2006, in a traditional Hindu ceremony. The couple has two children: Laxmi Narayan Shah and Tek Narayan Shah. The family resides in Lamki Chuha Municipality, Kailali, Nepal.

Beyond music, Sunar is passionate about football and martial arts. He is also an avid reader and writer, having authored various creative works including poems, ghazals, short stories, essays, songs, and novels.

== Awards ==
SN	Awards category	Awards title	Songs	Result	Ref
1	Best Singer Male	3rd Pim Nepal Film Festival – 2020	Darling	Won	
2	Best Singer of the Year Male (Folk Pop)	4th Sagarmatha Music Award – 2022	Lahure Sipahi Dai	Won	
3	Best Folk Pop Singer (Jurry)	Natyashwor Music Award – 2023	Columbus Ki Kanchhi	Won	
4.	Best Playback Singer	4th Nepal Music & Fashion Award – 2023	Adhuro Chhu Ma Timi Bina	Won	
5	Best Duet Singer	National Box Office Teej Music Award – 2022	Bariko Patama	Won	
6	Best Pop Singer	3rd Himalayan International Award – 2023	Yo Man	Won	
7	Best Modern Singer	5th Nepal Music & Fashion Award – 2024	Mayale Sajaula	won	
8	Best Modern Singer	4th Silver Music Awards 2025	Mayale Sajaula	Won	

== Honor ==
SN	Honor title	Date	ref
1	National Singer Honor	2020	
2	Artist & Creator Honor	2022	
4	National Bilakshan Talent Honor	2023	
5	National Film Culture Ratna Honor	2023	
6	National Personality & Talent Honor	2023	
7	Youth Singer Honor	2023	
8	Spiny Babbler Musicworker Honor	2023	
9	National Singer Honor	2024	

== Organization involvement ==
SN	Organization name	designation	ref
1	Music Research and Development Forum Nepal (MRDF Nepal)	President (2023 to Present )	
2	Film Artists’ Worker's Organization Nepal (FAWON)	Honorary Member	
3	Music Video Directors’ Guild Nepal	Honorary Member	
4	Sahayatra Nepal	Advisor	

== Judge ==
SN	Event name & year	Organized by	ref
1	12th International Folk Music Film Festival (2022)	Music Museum of Nepal	
2	4th Jyoti Films Music Awards (2023)	Royal Movies Pvt. Ltd.	
3	12th Nepal Africa Film Festival (2024)	College of Journalism and Mass Communication (CJMC)	
4	6th National Inclusive Music Award 2023	PIM Nepal	
5	Season 2: Miss and Mrs. Universal 2023	Sparkle Entertainment	
6	13th Dcine Award 2023	Chhayan Chhabi Creation	
7	2nd Kabya Music Award 2023	Kabya Music Center	

== Songs ==
SN	Song name	Release date	Ref
1	Columbus Ki Kanchhi	Oct 14, 2020	
2	Suna Na Yo Manko Kura	Nov 15, 2016	
3	Timro Jhalko Akha Bhari	Sep 23, 2020	
4	Lahure Sipahi Dai	Mar 16, 2022	
5	Bari Ko Patama	Jul 2, 2020	
6	Raijhuma	Sep 7, 2020	
7	Maile Maya Lagaye	2011	
8	Timro Kasam	Jul 6, 2021	
9	Timi Bina	2013	
10	Sapne Maine (Hindi Song)	Jan 12, 2018	
11	Mayale Sajaula	Jan 12, 2024	
12	Timro Mitho Batama	Mar 31, 2020	
13	Oe Beauty	Aug 22, 2018	
14	Timi Lai Maya Garau Bhanchha Yo Man	Nov 13, 2019	
15	Yo Mana	Jul 9, 2021	
16	Phool Bhanda	Feb 12, 2021	
17	Kauso Laisakyo	Sep 28, 2018	
18	Balendrako Battima	May 24, 2024	
19	Nirdoshi	Apr 4, 2020	
20	Timi Na Hunda Ko Ma	Sep 3, 2022	
21	We Love You Shambhu	Feb 15, 2023	
22	Yati komal Mutu mero	Sep 14, 2020	
23	Sajayako Thiya Timilaai	Apr 22, 2020	
24	Mera Khaab Hai Tu (Hindi Song)	Feb 3, 2018	
25	Sarara Maya Sarara	Apr 2, 2020	
26	Chokho Maya Saili	Jul 21, 2018	
27	Salam Chha	Apr 19, 2020	
28	Dashin Tihar Aayo	Sep 4, 2020	
29	Manma Sadhai	Sep 20, 2020	
30	Mayako Ghar	2014	
31	Timi Timi Chhau	Oct 27, 2018	
32	Hurkeko Bainsa	Jan 13, 2019	
33	Madalu Rankaideu	Jul 25, 2024	
34	Maya Ma	Sep 11, 2020	
35	Kinara Haruma	Dec 8, 2020	
36	Timro Maya	Mar 19, 2020	
37	Ye Maya	Apr 6, 2019	
38	Prem Katha	Aug 31, 2024	
39	Chhoda Satauna	Dec 26, 2024	

=== Movie songs ===
SN	Song name	Release date	Movie name	Ref
1	Sagar Mathi	Apr 27, 2019	Ray	
2	Aamaile Bhanthe	Dec 29, 2017	Jhamak Bahadur	
3	Chandrama Jhain Ramri	Sep 22, 2017	Babu Kancha	
4	Kahile Pani Nawoiline	Mar 16, 2022	Namaste Nepal	
5	Jati Jati	Aug 29, 2016	Don't Break My Heart	
6.	Buddha Born in Nepal	Apr 15, 2016	Buddha Born in Nepal	
7.	Maile Ishq gare	Sep 15, 2015	Aawara	
8.	Supari Kancho	Jan 15, 2018	Nepte	
9.	Marchhu Ma Ta Oe Kali	May 18, 2016	Kampan	
10.	Kasto Kasto Lagdai chha	May 26, 2016	Kampan	
11	Sagar	....	Kurwan	
12	Nyano Lagcha	Aug 17, 2018	Dhoom 3	
13	Mirga Nayeni	Aug 1, 2018	Jhamak Bahadur	
14	Mahasus	Nov 19, 2019	Andhakar	
15	Mero Man	Aug 29, 2016	Don't Break My Heart	
16	Yo Maya Yo Maya	Feb 26, 2018	Koila	
17	Jhamak Bahadur	Jul 20, 2018	Jhamak bahadur	
18	Yautai Mutu Hamro	Apr 20, 2016	kampan	
19	Aau Basna Yo	Jun 6, 2020	Kamala	
20	Darling	Mar 23, 2021	Lobhi Papi	
21	Bul Bul	Aug 29, 2016	Don't Break My Heart	
23	Dalli	Mar 12, 2018	Encounter Galli	
24	Udna Thalyo Yo Man	....	Shrishtiko Phool	
25	Adhuro Chhu Ma Timi Bina	Apr 27, 2023	Roshani	
26	Bahiri Pida Le Bhanda	Sep 2, 2024	Nametine Ghau	
27	Aghori	..........	Aghori	
28	Break Dance	Jun 18, 2025	Wrong Destination-2	
