= Mahendra Ratna Multiple Campus =

Campus in Ilam district of Nepal

- महेन्द्र रत्न बहुमुखी क्यामपस
- Established: 2017 B.S.
- Parent institution: Tribhuwan University
- Head: Tanka P. Bhattarai
- Students: 2353
- Location: Ilam District, Nepal
- Website: mrmc.tu.edu.np

Mahendra Ratna Multiple Campus (Nepali: महेन्द्र रत्न बहुमुखी क्यामपस) is one of the constituent campuses of Tribhuvan University in Ilam district in eastern Nepal. The campus was established in Asar 21, 2017 BS (1960 AD). The campus is also approved by University Grants Commission of Nepal. The campus was named after the then-ruling monarch King Mahendra and his wife Queen Ratna.

The campus has four faculties - Management, Humanities, Education and Science. It has 85 faculty members and 35 administrative staff. Courses are offered in bachelors and masters level. Total numbers of the students are 2353 in four faculties.

The campus was approved to run autonomously by Tribhuvan University on 2066 BS (1 February 2010). This allowed the campus to take academic, financial, infrastructural and administrative decisions by itself.
