= Dharmendra Bikram Nembang =

Nepalese poet (born 1976)

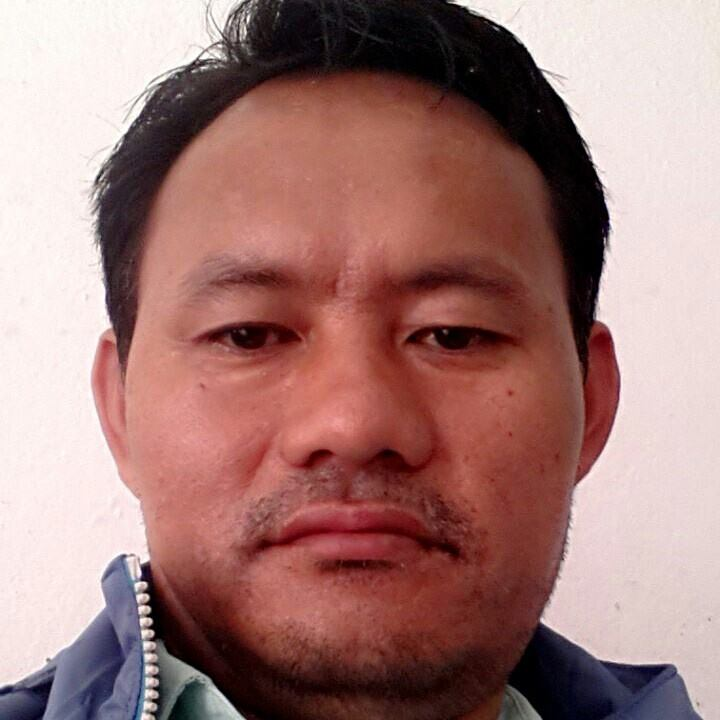
- Mr. Nembang in July 2015
- Born: Dharmendra Bikram Nembang; February 7, 1976 (age 50); Pauwa Saratap, Panchthar, Nepal
- Other names: Rato Bagh(रातो बाघ)
- Occupations: Writer, Politician
- Years active: 1996-Present
- Known for: Pioneer of Multicolourism(सामान्य बहुरङ्गवाद अभियन्ता)
- Spouse: Dipika Sambahamphe Nembang
- Children: Siddartha Bikram Nembang
- Parent(s): Krishna Bikram Nembang (father), Bal Kumari Nembang (mother)
- Relatives: Bairagi Kainla (uncle)

Dharmendra Bikram Nembang(Nepali:धर्मेन्द्र बिक्रम नेम्वाङ) is a Nepalese poet. His is the pioneer of Multicolourism(सामान्य बहुरँगवाद). His fellow poets for literary struggle on Multicolourism are Swapnil Smriti(स्वप्निल स्मृति), Samadarshi Kainla (समदर्शि काईला), and Chandrabir Tumbapo (चन्द्रवीर तुम्बापो). He introduced new realm of postmodern literature in Nepal with the publication of his first anthology of poems entitled Bheerai Bheerko rang (भीरै भीरको रङ).

== Publications ==
- Bheerai Bheerko Rang ra Arko Sanskaran
- Dharmendra Nembangka Kabitaharu
- Samanya Bahurangabad Euta Travelling Philosophyko Parikalpana
- Rato Bagh
- Yuba Bichar Yuba Nepal, Aamul Paribartanko Pakshama Ek Avadharana

== Literary Awards ==
Mr. Dharmendra Bikram Nembang was awarded with Swadesh Puraskar, 2016 by Hong Kong Sajha Srinkhala in December 2016.
