= Swapnil Smriti =

Nepali author

Swapnil Smriti (स्वप्निल स्मृति)
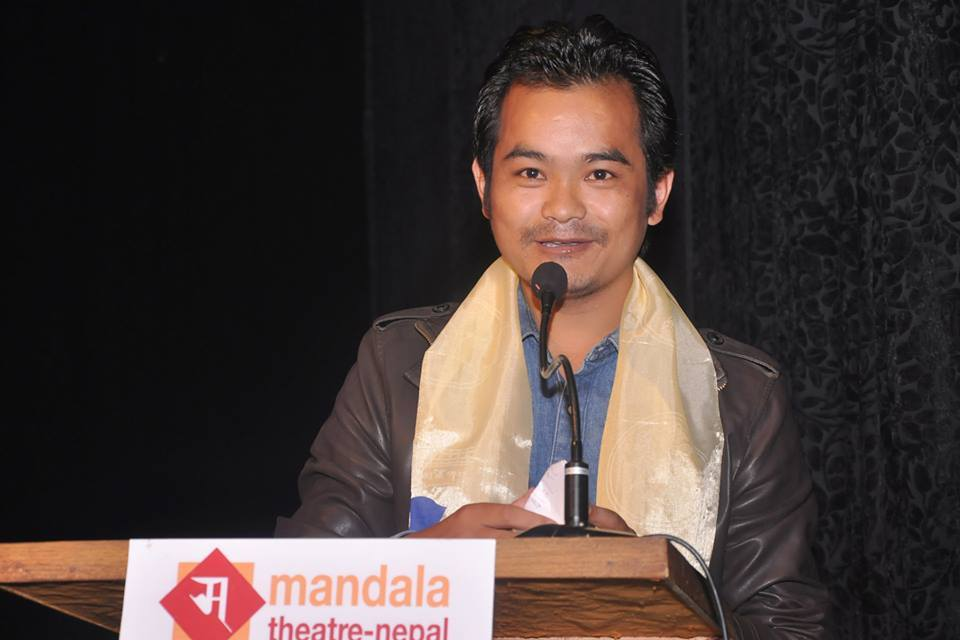
- Swapnil Smriti Reciting Poem in 2015
- Born: Sanman Chemjong; November 14, 1981 (age 44); Syabrumba, Panchthar, Nepal
- Other names: Swapnil Smriti (स्वप्निल स्मृति)
- Occupations: Author, Poet
- Years active: 1998-Present
- Known for: Pioneer of Multicolourism (सामान्य बहुरङ्गवाद अभियन्ता)
- Website: www.swapnilranga.blogspot.com

Sanman Chemjong (Nepali: सनमान चेम्जोङ; born 14 November 1981), who writes under the pen name Swapnil Smriti is a Nepali writer from Panchthar, Nepal. He is best known for his literary movement Multicolourism (सामान्य बहुरँगवाद) along with Dharmendra Bikram Nembang. He elevated the realm of postmodern literature to its new height in Nepal with the publication of his first collection of poems entitled Rangai Rangako Bheer (रङ्गै रङ्गको भीर) in 2005 AD.

He is a pioneer poet advocating, in his poems, the voices of marginalized, Janjatis, Madhesis and other minor groups those were suppressed during autocracy of Shah and Rana Regimes.

His works address the harsh realities of Nepali Society, essentially the social discrimination implemented by the rulers on different ethnic groups. The need of cultural as well as social identity for them is the clear aspiration of his writings.

The history, civilization, and culture of Limbu Ethnic Community of Nepal (to which he belongs) are hugely reflected in his works. He has written and published poems, stories, lyrics and essay on Limbu/Kirat customs, mythology, metaphors and folklores in various periodicals. Some of the songs have been given music and recorded too.

== Early life and education ==
Smriti was born in November 14, 1981 in Syabrumba, Panchthar, Nepal. He was born under the name Sanman Chemjong, but as a writer, used the pen name Swa. Swapnil Smriti (स्व. स्वप्निल स्मृति) where Swa (स्व.) means 'Late'. He stopped using Swa. (स्व.) in his pen name since the date second edition of his collection of poems Baduli Ra Sudur Samjhana was published.

Swapnil Smriti lived his childhood in Syabrumba, Panchthar. As a child, Smriti often wrote poems and published in local newspapers, magazines and literary periodicals. He moved to Dhankuta to undertake his higher education. Later, he moved to Kathmandu to pursue his bachelor's degree and to live his dream of becoming a poet.

Swapnil Smriti did his schooling in Panchthar from Shree Mahendrodaya Secondary School. He completed his graduation in Journalism from Ratna Rajya Laxmi Campus affiliated to Tribhuvan University. He is now working in Nepal Academy of Music and Drama (NAMUDA).

== Published works ==
Swapnil Smriti has published the following books:

- Rangai Rangako Bheer - रङ्गै रङ्गको भीर, Poem Collection, 2062 B.S. (2005 A.D.)
- Baduli Ra Sudur Shamjhana - बाडुली र सुदुर सम्झना, Poem Collection, 2068 B.S. (2011 A.D.)

== Works ==
Swapnil Smriti has edited many books, magazines, websites and literary periodicals. His most important works are as follows:

SN	Book/Magazine/Website	Publisher	Post	Duration
1	Rangarag, Trimonthly	Nepal Academy of Music and Drama	Sub-Editor	2016 A.D.-Present
2	Limbuwan Bidroha, Monthly	Limbuwan Rastriya Mukti Morcha Nepal	Sub-Editor	2006 A.D.
3	Sunrise Post, Weekly	Sarita Devi Rai	Copy Editor	2006 A.D.
4	Kathmandu Today, Weekly	Tikaram Rai	Copy Editor	2005 A.D.
5	Fung, Monthly	Amar Tummyahang	Executive Editor	2004 A.D.-2007 A.D.
6	Maato, Monthly	Nawaraj Rai	Editing Member	2004-2006 A.D.
7	Taanchhoppaa, Weekly	Kirat Yakthung Chumlung, Central Committee	Sub-Editor	2003 A.D.-2005 A.D.

== Literary awards ==
The following are the list of literary awards received by Swapnil Smriti:

- Second Prize in National Poem Competition Organized by Bimal Memorial Library, Dharan in 2060 B.S. (2003 A.D.)
- Best Annual Creation Prize by Nagarjun Literary Magazine in 2059 B.S. (2002 A.D.)
- First Prize in Limbu National Poem Competition Organized by Kirat Yakthung Chumlung in 2057 B.S. (2000 A.D.)
