= Dhankuta Multiple Campus =

Campus affiliated with Tribhuvan University, Nepal

- धनकुटा बहुमुखी क्याम्पस
- Established: 1955
- Parent institution: Tribhuwan University
- Students: 2000
- Location: Dhankuta
- Website: dhmc.tu.edu.np

Dhankuta Multiple Campus (Nepali: धनकुटा बहुमुखी क्याम्पस) is one of the constituent campuses of Tribhuvan University located in Dhankuta district of eastern Nepal. The campus was established in 1955/56. It is recognized by University Grants Commission (Nepal)

== History ==
The campus was inaugurated by King Mahendra in May 1956. When the campus started, there were only six students and it was called a degree college. It offered degrees on intermediate and bachelor level in humanities and social sciences. In 1973, the campus was converted to a multiple campus based on the National Education System Plan of 1971. Faculty of Education was added on the same year.

== Infrastructure ==
The campus has 100 acres of land that was donated by Bhakta Bahadur Basnet. It is run by 61 professors and 42 administrative staff.
