= Mechi Multiple Campus =

College in Jhapa, Nepal

Coordinates: 26.560768°N 88.086594°E

Mechi Multiple Campus Tribhuvan University
- मेची बहुमुखी क्याम्पस त्रिभुवन विश्वविद्यालय
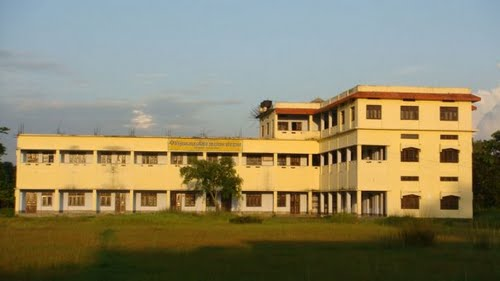
- Type: constituent
- Established: 1964
- Parent institution: Tribhuvan University
- Accreditation: University Grants Commission
- Campus Chief: Devi Prasad Acharya
- Academic staff: 126
- Administrative staff: 54
- Students: approx. 1,800
- Location: Bhadrapur-8, Jhapa
- Language: Nepali, English
- Nickname: MMC
- Website: memc.tu.edu.np

Mechi Multiple Campus (Nepali: मेची बहुमुखी क्याम्पस) is a constituent campus of Tribhuvan University in Bhadrapur municipality of Jhapa district. Founded in 1964, it is the only constituent campus of Tribhuvan University in the district. As of August 2017, 126 academic and 54 administrative staffs were employed at the college. The college administration is headed by Devi Prasad Acharya, who replaced Jiwan Pokhrel as the "Campus Chief" on 12 January 2025.

To begin with, the college offered an Intermediate of Arts (IA) program in humanities, which was soon followed by undergraduate programs. At present, the college runs undergraduate and postgraduate programs. The intermediate programs were fully scrapped in 2010, following Tribhuvan University's decision to phase out Proficiency Certificate Level (PCL) programs from its colleges. This termination of PCL programs brought about a sharp decline in the number of students at the college. In its heyday, the college had about 5,000 students. Today the number is around 1,800. The college gained institutional autonomy on 19 May 2017. The college received the Quality Assurance and Accreditation (QAA) certification from the University Grants Commission (UGC) on 6 March 2019.

== History ==
With inauguration by Brigadier General Bhupalman Singh Karki, Mechi Multiple Campus was established on 12 Ashwin 2021 Bikram Samvat (BS) (i.e., 27 September 1964). With no private building for the next five years, classes in the early years took place only in the evening, in the premises of Bhadrapur Red Cross and Bhadrapur High School. The construction of college's physical infrastructure began to gather pace from 2024 BS (c. 1967), (Note: Because Bikram Samvat leads the Gregorian calendar by 56.7 years, the CE year can be best approximated by subtracting 56.7 from the BS year and rounding it down to the nearest integral value.) and it took three years until completion. The college was relocated to its present place in 2027 BS (c. 1970).

The college celebrated its golden jubilee in the year 2071 BS. The golden jubilee was commemorated with programs and extra-curricular activities all year round, including a major three-day cultural event in Ashwin. Inaugurated by the then-President Ram Baran Yadav, who was the chief guest, the cultural event saw attendance from a host of alumni, donors, politicians, and national dignitaries—including the then-Governor of Nepal Rastra Bank Yuba Raj Khatiwada, the Nepali Congress leader Krishna Prasad Sitaula, and CPN–UML's Agni Kharel.

The college began offering science programs from 2046 BS (c. 1989).

== Campus ==
The campus, which spreads over an area of 16 bighas (c. 27 acres), (Note: The bigha is a local unit of land measurement, standardized to 72,000 square feet.) lies in a quiet, semi-urban area—about 1 km southeast of Bhadrapur Airport. The area is connected to Mechi Highway and Birtamod–Chandragadhi Road. The campus yard constitutes a canteen, a football and a cricket ground, a basketball court, a tea garden, a soil test lab, an administrative building, a FSU building, a boys and girls hostel, and two other major buildings—one devoted to the science faculty and the other for the rest. A park featuring monuments of Province No. 1's five luminaries is being constructed inside the college premises. A second building for the science faculty is also under construction. The campus served as a quarantine center during the COVID-19 pandemic in Nepal.

== Academics ==
The college offers the following undergraduate and postgraduate programs:

Undergraduate programs

- Bachelor of Science (BSc) in physics, mathematics, statistics, chemistry, zoology, botany, and environmental science
- BSc in Computer Science and Information Technology (BSc CSIT)
- Bachelor of Arts (BA) in mathematics, economics, anthropology, culture, English, Nepali, history, and political science
- Bachelor of Business Administration (BBA)
- Bachelor of Computer Application (BCA)
- Bachelor of Information Management (BIM)
- Bachelor of Social Work (BSW)
- Bachelor of Business Studies (BBS)

Postgraduate programs

- Master of Arts (MA) in Nepali, economics, English, and anthropology
- Master of Business Studies (MBS)

Between 2068 and 2074 BS, Mechi Multiple Campus offered a unique program called Bachelor of Science in Tea Technology and Management (BSc TTM), being the only college in the country to offer an undergraduate tea course. A large part of Nepal's tea industry is based in eastern Nepal, particularly in Jhapa and Ilam districts, and the program was offered with the aim of availing the requirement of qualified and skilled human resource in the tea sector. Despite the seeming potential, the tea management course failed to attract students, with the enrollment dropping from 24 students in the first batch to 16 in the second batch to only 6 in the third batch. The decrease in the number of students was attributed partly to the ineffective publicity of the academic course and partly to the uncertainties looming over its prospects. The program ceased seeing new enrollees after the third batch, and got fully terminated in 2074 BS.

On 29 December 2016, the Commission for the Investigation of Abuse of Authority (CIAA) raided six colleges in Jhapa, including Mechi Multiple Campus, as per the complaints lodged at the anti-graft body that some of the professors of public colleges were teaching in private colleges alongside. Umanath Oli—the then-chief at Mechi Multiple Campus—was reported to have admitted that some professors had invested in private colleges and took classes there. He claimed that they had been doing so before the provision of requiring approval from the university monitoring commission came into effect.

On 4 April 2019, an assistant professor of the college resigned after being convicted of improper conduct. On 8 July 2021, an associate professor died in a motorcycle accident.

== Infrastructure ==
- Cricket Ground

== Politics ==
Students' wings affiliated to the Nepal Communist Party (NCP), Nepali Congress (NC), and Rastriya Prajatantra Party (RPP) and teachers' wings associated with the NCP and NC are operative in Mechi Multiple Campus. The last Free Students' Union (FSU) election was held in the campus on 1 March 2017. Many key figures in current Nepali politics—such as the NC leader Bishwa Prakash Sharma and the RPP leader Rajendra Lingden—started out their political careers as student leaders in the college.

== Mechi Campus Cricket Ground ==
The Mechi Campus Cricket Ground is located within the grounds of Mechi Multiple Campus in Bhadrapur, Jhapa, Province No. 1, Nepal. It is one of several sports facilities available at the campus, which also includes a football ground and a basketball court. The cricket ground, also known as Mechi Cricket Ground (MCG), has been the subject of recent renovations and discussions regarding its improvement to support cricket development in the region.

== Notable people ==
Some of the eminent graduates of the college are Bishwa Prakash Sharma (MP and Nepali Congress general secretary), Yubaraj Khatiwada (Finance Minister of Nepal), CP Mainali (former Deputy Prime Minister and NCP leader), RK Mainali (NCP leader), Biswa Prakash Sharma (NC leader), Rajendra Lingden (RPP leader), and Arpan Sharma Kattel (former Guinness World Record holder). Nawaraj Parajuli (the lead engineer for the United States Postal Service (USPS) Boise RPDC) KR Khambu (author) serves as a professor in the college, whose autobiographical memoir "Chaya Ko Laskar" was unveiled in 2019 by the then Prime Minister KP Sharma Oli.

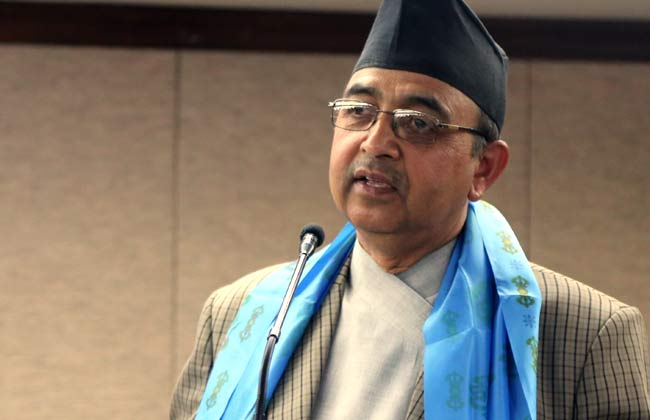
Former Deputy Prime Minister CP Mainali

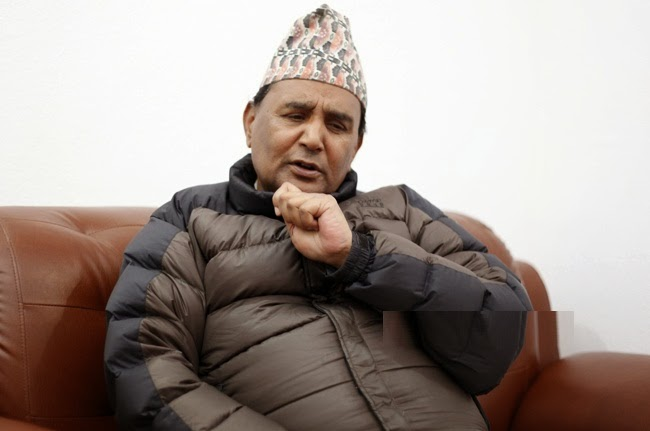
Communist politician RK Mainali

== Gallery ==
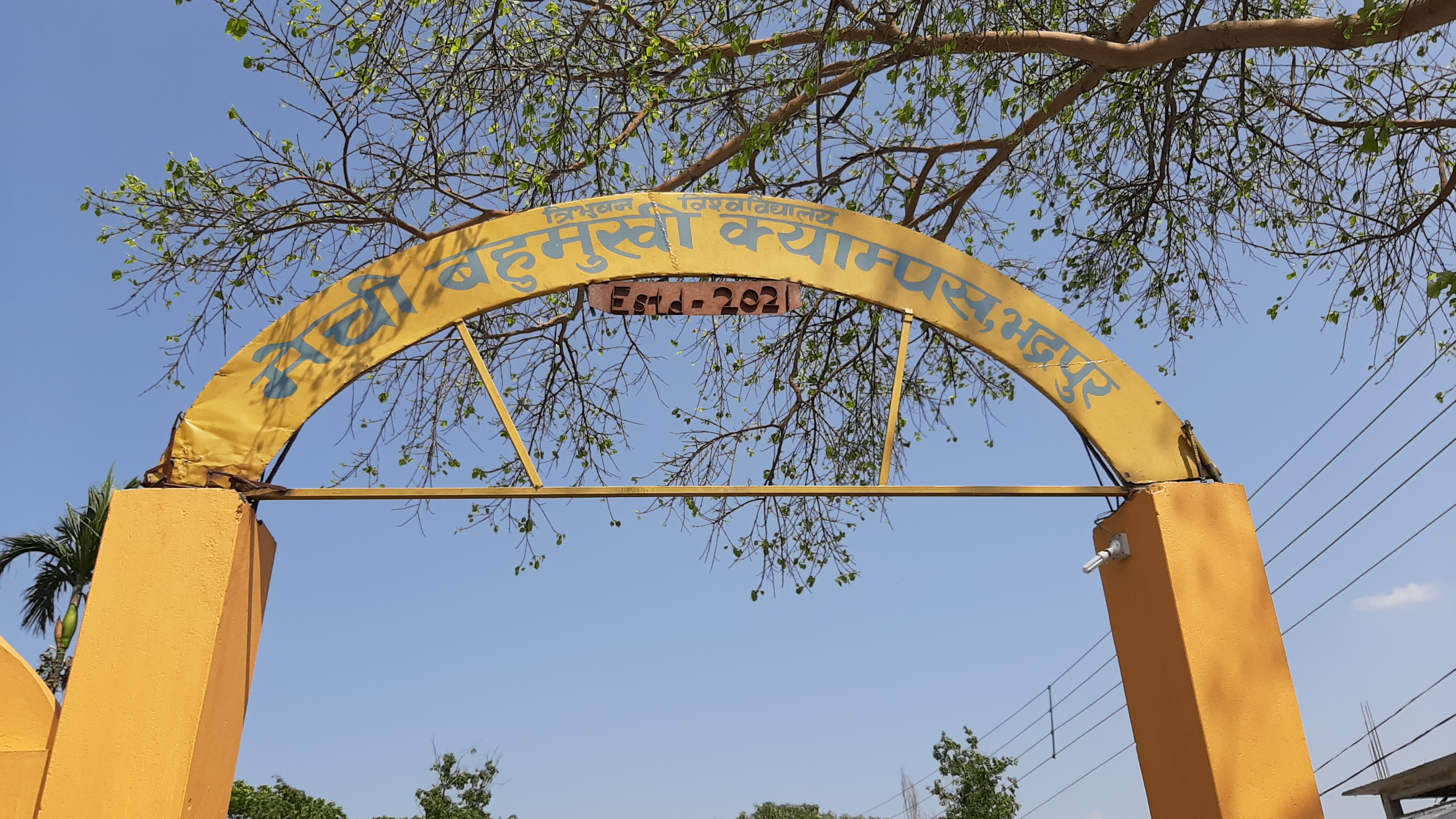
Western entrance to the college

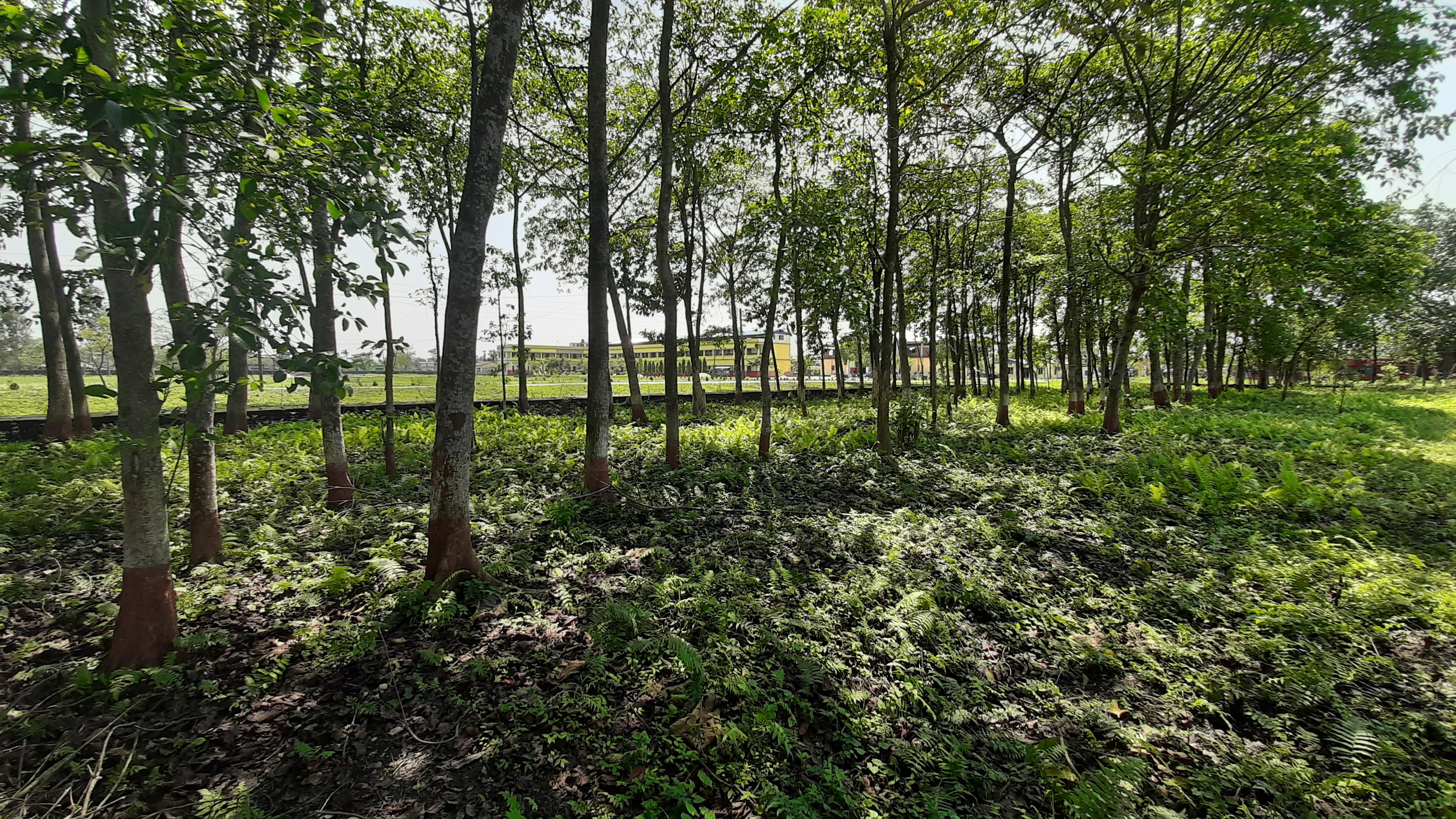
Trees in the science yard, with the college's non-science block in the background

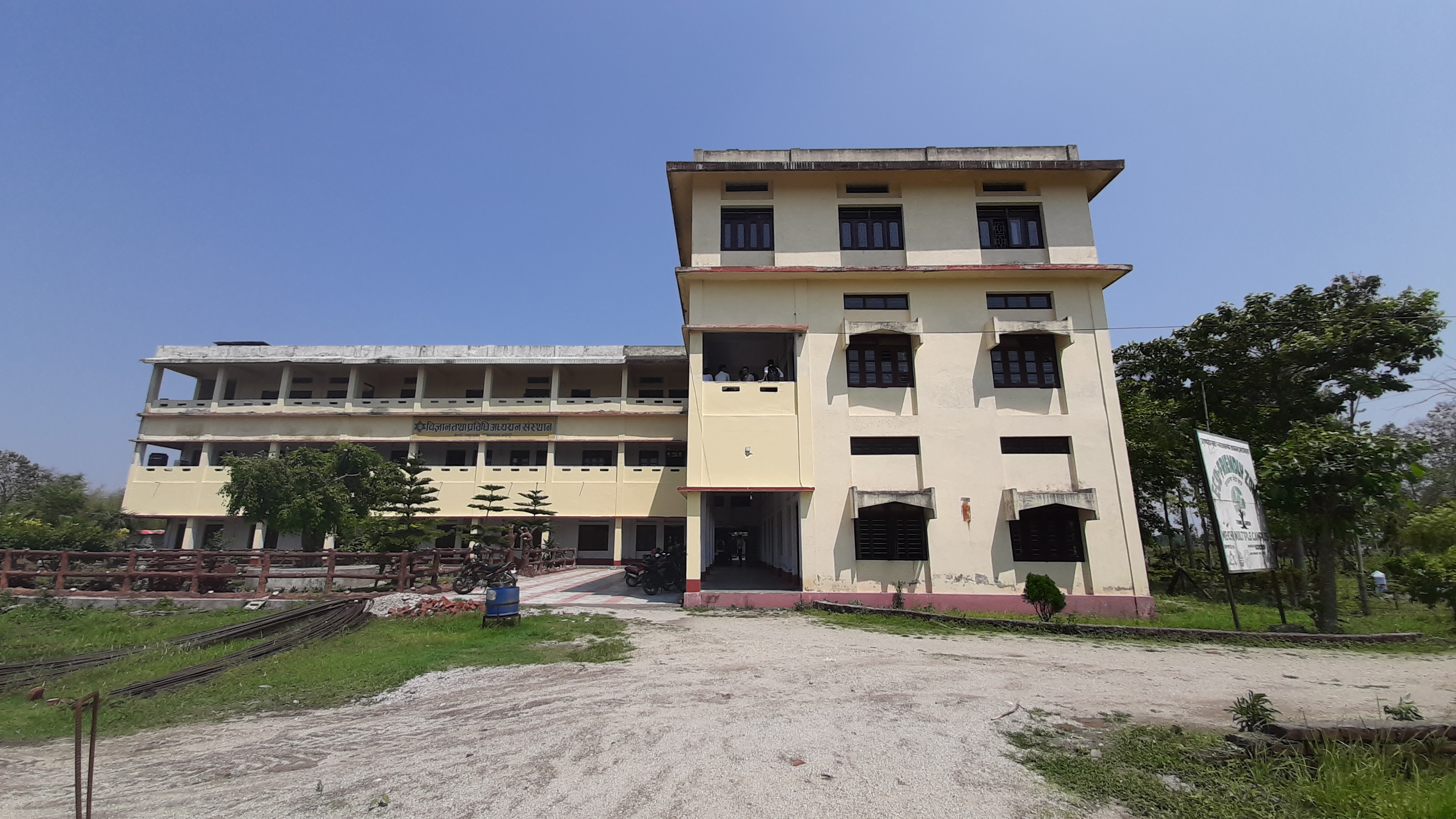
Science block of the college

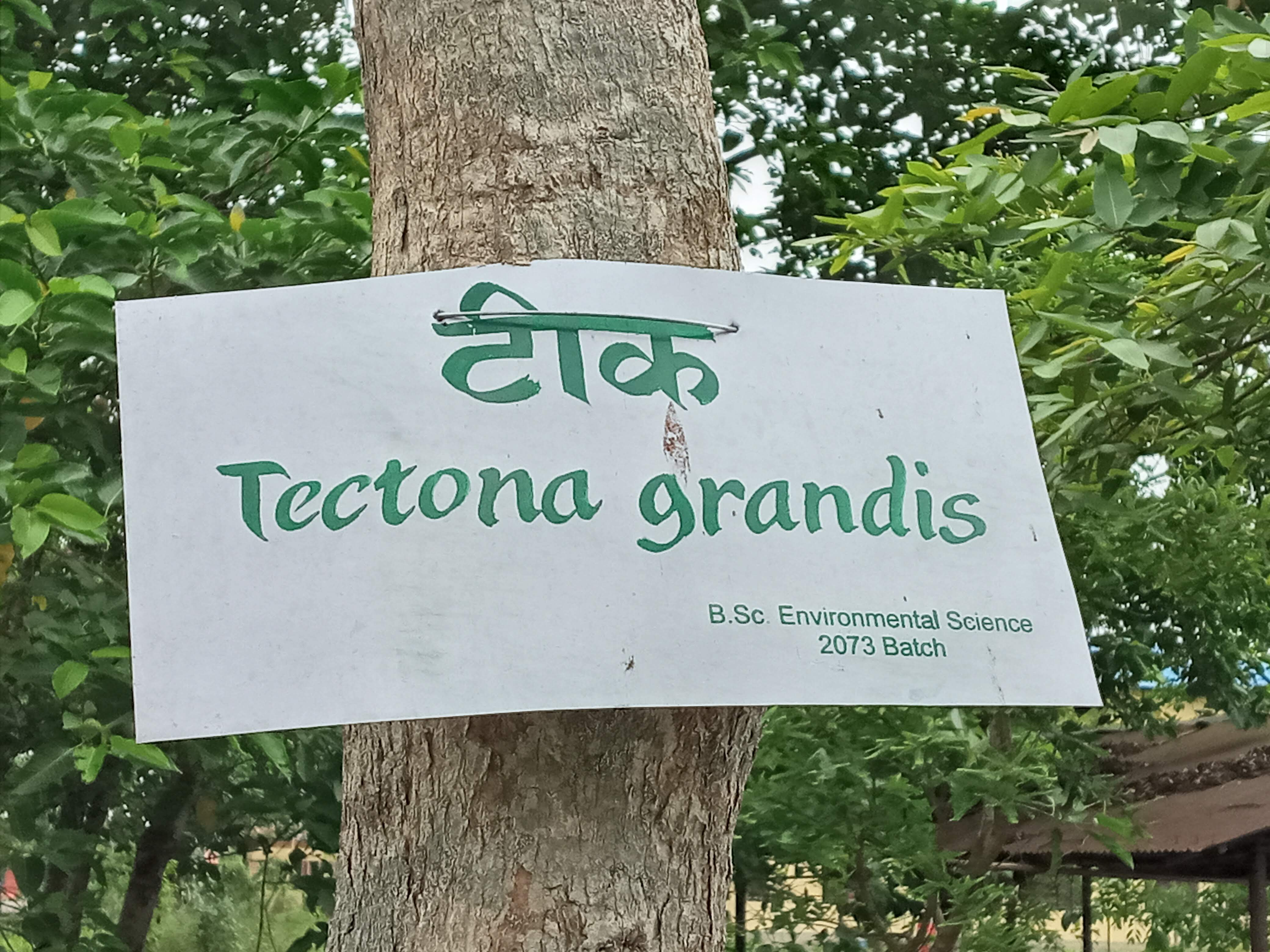
A tag on a teak tree inside the college premises

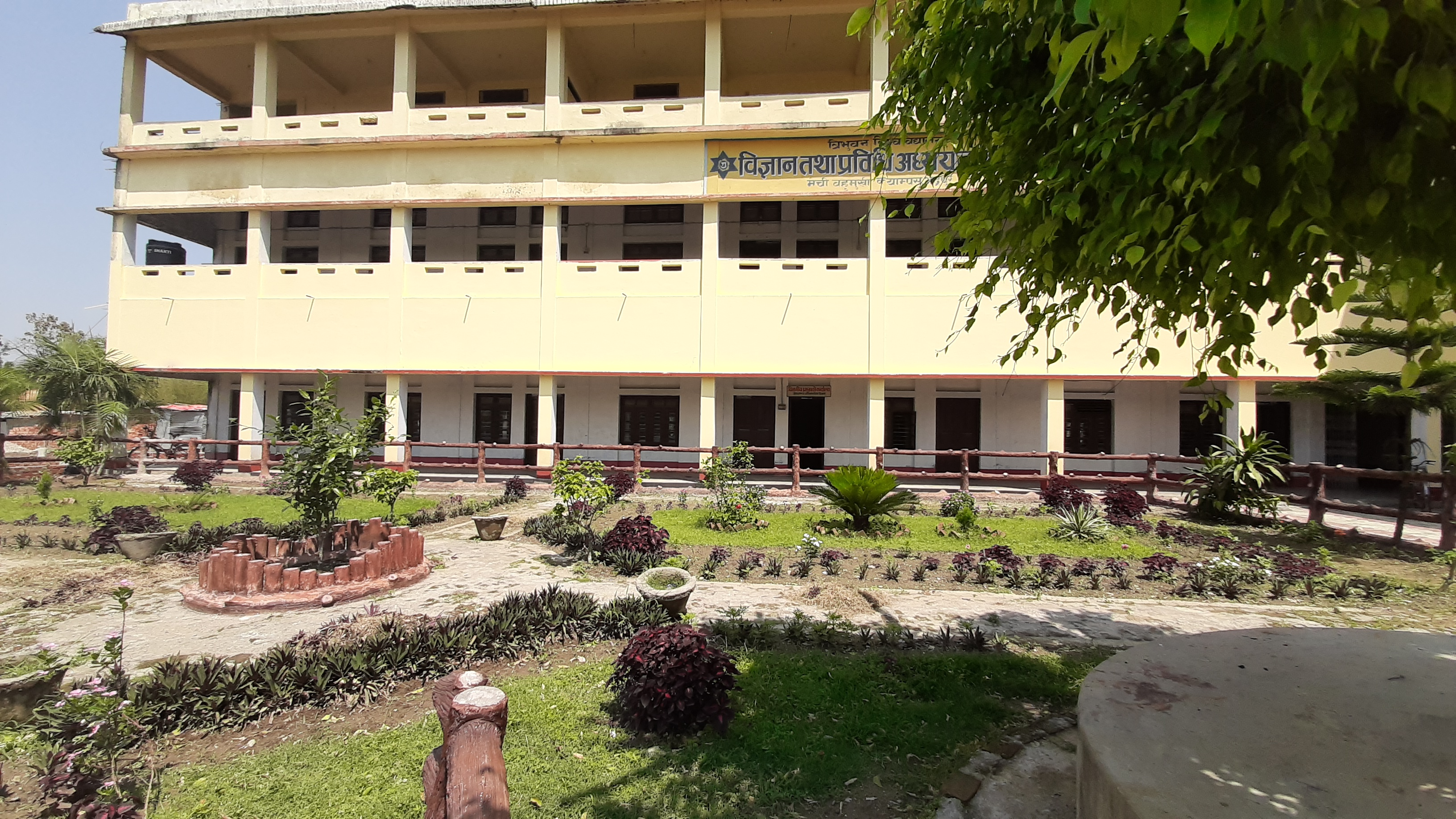
A garden in front of the science block

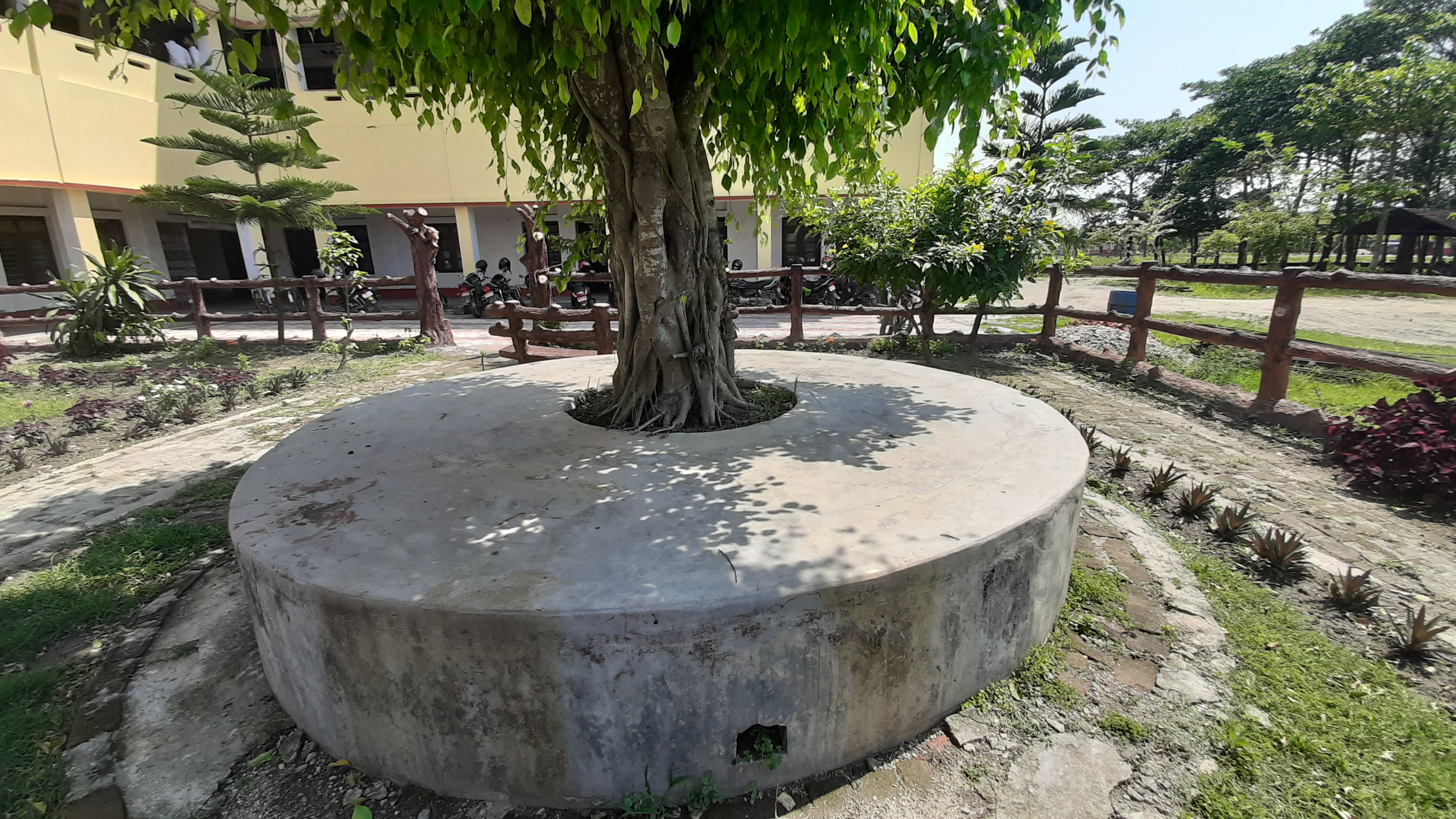
A chautari in the garden

== See also ==
- Damak Multiple Campus
- Mahendra Morang Adarsh Multiple Campus
- Tri-Chandra Multiple Campus
