= Tripureshwor =

Tripureshwor त्रिपुरेश्वर
- Village development committee
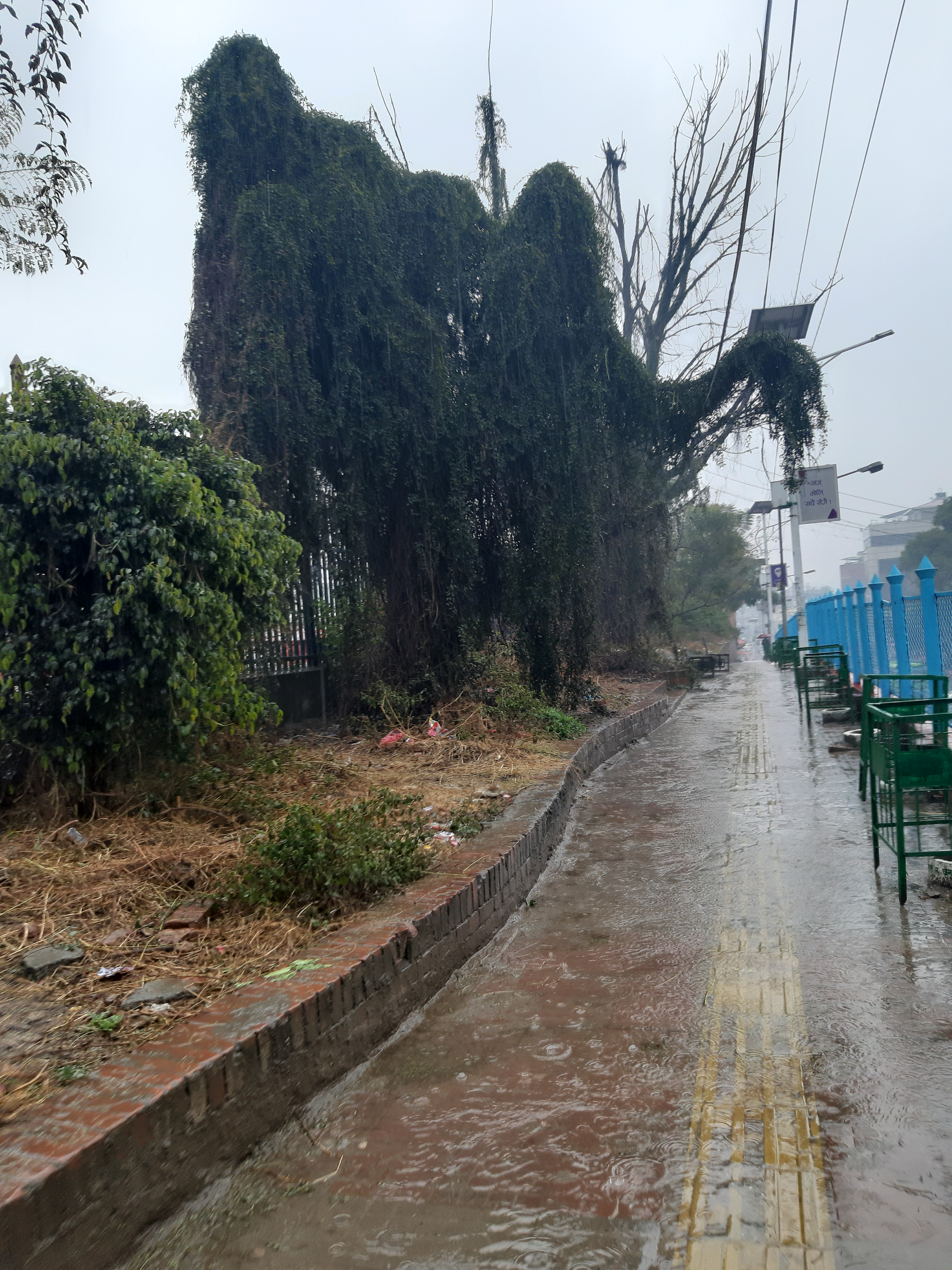
- Interactive map of Tripureshwor
- Location in Nepal
- Coordinates: 28°00′N 84°53′E
- Country: Nepal
- Zone: Bagmati Zone
- District: Dhading District

Population (1991)
  - Total: 2,707
  - Religions: Hindu
- Time zone: UTC+5:45 (Nepal Time)

Tripureshwor is a village development committee in Dhading District in the Bagmati Zone of central Nepal. At the time of the 1991 Nepal census it had a population of 2707 and had 497 houses in it. This is one of the mid-north village development committee which was politically popular during 10 year of insurgency. The rising number of population is making this part much more populated than last five years. The biggest river of the district, Netrawati passes through this village. One of the popular town of the district, Khahare is located in the north of Tripureshwor. Khahare is now well doing in the field of agriculture. People here are dependent in their agriculture for their livelihood. There are 8 wards.
