= Snatakottar Campus =

Campus in Parsa district of Nepal

- स्नातकोत्तर क्याम्पस
- Established: 1981
- Parent institution: Tribhuwan University
- Location: Biratnagar
- Website: pgc.tu.edu.np

Snatakottar Campus (Nepali: स्नातकोत्तर क्याम्पस) also known as Post Graduate Campus is one of the constituent campuses of Tribhuvan University located in Biratnagar city of Nepal. The campus was established in 1981.

There are three faculties viz. humanities, commerce and science in the campus. The faculties are divided into nine departments for humanities and two for science and commerce. There are about 70 teaching staffs in the campus.

== History ==
The campus was established in June 1981 (2040 BS). It was an extension of Mahendra Morang Adarsh Multiple Campus of Biratnagar in the start. Later, the campus was separated as an independent campus.

== Infrastructure ==
The campus has four bighas of land and a three storied building having 12 rooms. The infrastructure was provided by the Birtatnagar airport via the government of Nepal. Later, another building with 17 rooms was added. Other infrastructures was constructed by Tribhuvan University funded by the campus.

== Others ==
The campus is said to be over-politicized.
