= Scientific Socialist Communist Party, Nepal =

Scientific Socialist Communist Party वैज्ञानिक समाजवादी कम्युनिस्ट पार्टी
- Leader: Aahuti
- Founded: 5 May 2018
- Students wing: Scientific Socialist Students' Organization
- Women wing: Scientific Socialist Women's Organization
- Ideology: Communism; Scientific Socialism; Anti-Imperialism; Marxism-Leninism; Maoism

Website
- https://sscpn.org (Currently offline)

The Scientific Socialist Communist Party, Nepal (Nepali: वैज्ञानिक समाजवादी कम्युनिष्ट पार्टी, नेपाल, abbreviated वैसकपा, नेपाल) is a political party in Nepal. The party was founded on 5 May 2018, the 200th birth centenary of Karl Marx. The party founder Aahuti had previously been a leader of Janamorcha Nepal and later the Communist Party of Nepal (Maoist Centre), and had rebelled against the unity process of CPN(Maoist Centre) with the CPN(UML) in late 2017. Ahuti formed a 51-member 'Ideological, Political and Organizational Mobilization Committee-2075' for building the new party. Balaram Timilsina, Rajeshwari Subedi, Jagrat Rayamajhi and Dhruv Parajuli were some of the former Maoist leaders that joined Ahuti's party building effort.

In December 2020 the party joined the Strategic United Front alongside the CPN led by Netra Bikram Chand, the Communist Party of Nepal (Revolutionary Maoist) led by Mohan Baidya and the CPN led by Rishi Kattel, in opposition to the dissolution of parliament by Prime Minister K.P. Oli.

In January 2021 Aahuti declared that the first party congress of the Scientific Socialist Communist Party, Nepal would be held in 2078 Bikram Sambat. A 47-member preparatory committee, headed by Ahuti, was formed ahead of the party congress. On 11 February 2021 the Strategic United Front was formalized, with Jagrat Rayamajhi as one of its 12 Central Committee members.
