= Public Youth Campus =

Campus in Nepal

- पब्लिक यूथ क्याम्पस
- Established: 1971
- Parent institution: Tribhuwan University
- Students: 4000
- Location: Kathmandu
- FSU chairman: Nabin Pandey (NSU)
- Website: pyc.tu.edu.np

Public Youth Campus (Nepali: पब्लिक यूथ क्याम्पस) is one of the constituent campuses of Tribhuvan University located in Chhetrapati, Kathmandu, Nepal. The campus was established in 1971 (2028 BS).

The campus is focused to teach management and business studies and offers course from bachelor and mastere levels. It is run by 70 full-time faculty members. The campus also publishes its own journal targeting management studies.
