= Prithvi Narayan Campus =

Campus of Tribhuvan University in Nepal

Coordinates: 28.239483°N 83.990192°E

- पृथ्वीनारायण क्याम्पस
- Type: Public co-educational
- Established: 1960
- Affiliations: Tribhuvan University
- Campus chief: Dr. Saroj Koirala
- Faculty: 549
- Students: 16,069
- Location: Pokhara, Kaski, Nepal
- Campus: Urban, 254.2 acres
- Colors
- Website: prnc.tu.edu.np

Prithvi Narayan Campus or P.N. Campus,(Nepali: पृथ्वीनारायण क्याम्पस) is a public co-educational institution located in the northern part of the Pokhara city and is one of the largest campuses affiliated to Tribhuvan University. The institution offers undergraduate (bachelors) and graduate (masters and doctorate) programmes. It is named after the king Prithvi Narayan Shah.

== History ==
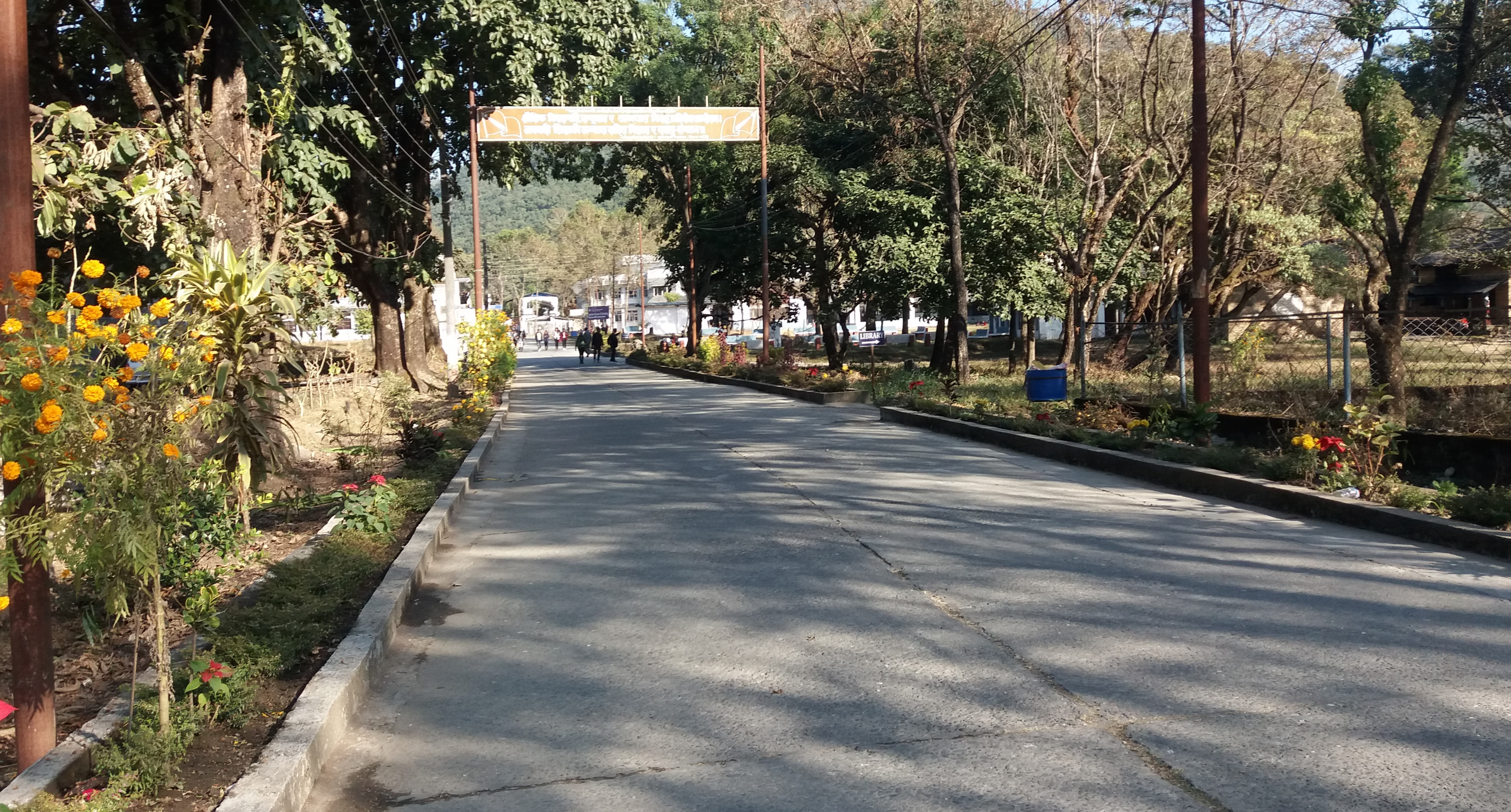
Campus's Gate from inside the campus

The campus, initially named Prithvi Narayan College, was established on Sept. 1, 1960, as the first community college of the Kaski district for post-secondary education by local efforts, during the period when Narayan Prashad Pokharel (Upadhayay) was the Sardar Badahakim of the region. Prithvi Narayan Inter College was started with 13 students and two teachers for post-secondary education and was run by the local community. Initially, the classes were conducted in Kanya School, Nadipur Patan, and moved to Bhimkali Patan in Bagar, where it now exists. George John was the first Principal, and Narayan Bahadur Karki and Arjun Bikram Rana were the first administrative staff of the college. In its initial years, the classes were conducted at Ratna Rajya Laxmi High School. In 1961, it was granted public land in Bhimkali Patan, Bagar, where it currently exists. Regarded as one of the largest affiliate campuses of TU, it is a major center for Undergraduate, Graduate and Post Graduates education in the Gandaki Pradesh.

The campus is regarded as one of the important educational institutions in the country and receives government grants distributed through the TU. In accordance with the TU decentralization act of 1998, the campus elected a management committee in Sept. 1999 which handles tasks such as construction of physical infrastructure, making rules, working plans and economic policies and a sub committee under the management committee looks day-to-day affairs of the campus. The campus is spread over 35 hectares along on the banks of the Seti River. The campus buildings occupy only a small part of its total area; most of the land is open and covered with grass and trees. In 2006, UNDP Global Environmental funded a project to develop this open space as Green Space Park, where university students could learn about environmental conservation and demonstrate the use of open space to serve the leisure and recreational needs of the growing urban population of Pokhara.

== Programmes ==
The campus is providing Undergraduate, Graduate and Post Graduate courses for students. The Undergraduate is the most popular program with Bachelor programs. The Graduate and Post Graduate level consists of Masters and Doctorate programs respectively. Five different faculties are identified: Science, Law, Humanities, Education, and Management. The campus is introducing newer subjects in order to fulfill the requirements to upgrade itself into a full-fledged university. The courses offered by PN Campus are as follows:

a) Bachelor's Level

Bachelor of Arts (BA 3 Years) Bachelor of Business Studies (BBS 4 Years)

Bachelor of Business Administration (BBA, 4 Years Semester Program)

Bachelor of Laws (LLB 3 Years)

Bachelor of Arts in Law (BALLB, 5-Years Semester Program)

1-Year Bachelor of Education (B.Ed) in Supervision

1-Year Bachelor of Education (B.Ed) in Nepali

1-Year Bachelor of Education (B.Ed) in Mathematics

1-Year Bachelor of Education (B.Ed) in Economics

1-Year Bachelor of Education (B.Ed) in English

1-Year Bachelor of Education (B.Ed) in History

1-Year Bachelor of Education (B.Ed) in Geography

1-Year Bachelor of Education (B.Ed) in Political Science

Bachelor of Education (B.Ed - 4 Years)

Bachelor of Science (B.Sc General Science, 4 Years)

Bachelor of Science (B.Sc. CSIT, 4 Years Semester Program)

Bachelor of Science (B.Sc Geology, 4 Years Semester Program)

Bachelor of Computer Application (BCA, 4 Years Semester Program)

b) Master’s Level

Master of Arts (MA) in English

Master of Arts (MA) in Nepali

Master of Arts (MA) in Economics

Master of Arts (MA) in Geography

Master of Arts (MA) in Political Science

Master of Arts (MA) in History

Master of Arts (MA) in Sociology/Anthropology

Master of Arts (MA) in Population Studies

Master of Business Studies (MBS)

Master of Science in Physics (M.Sc. Semester Program)

Master of Science in Mathematics (M.Sc. Semester Program)

Master of Education (M.Ed) in English

Master of Education (M.Ed) in Nepali

Master of Education (M.Ed) in EPM

Master of Education (M.Ed) in Curriculum

Master of Education (M.Ed) in Economics

Master of Education (M.Ed) in Health

Master of Education (M.Ed) in Mathematics

== Free Students' Union ==
The Tribhuvan University law requires its affiliate campuses to allow the formation of democratic Free Student Unions (Nepali : स्वतन्त्र बिद्यार्थी युनियन) mandated with handling extra curricular activities of the campus and matters related to student affairs. Although the student union was conceived as an organization to be the direct representatives of students of the college, their activities are more inclined towards the politics of the country. Therefore, they are also called student political parties. The major student parties are Nepal Student Union, All Nepal National Free Students Union and All Nepal National Independent Students' Union (Revolutionary) and participate in the elections to form the student union council of the campus that has a term of 2 years. All Nepal National Free Students Union, a student wing of CPN(UML) currently holds a majority of seats in the student union council and has been winning the elections successively since the establishment of the free student union in 1969.

Violent clashes between different student political parties are common, they are also frequently accused of vandalization of campus property. Awareness Group of Technical Science (AGTS) is another organization on the PN campus that is not affiliated with any political parties. It currently works as a mediator between students and the campus administration.
