= Tribhuvan Multiple Campus =

Campus in Palpa district of Nepal

- त्रिभुवन बहुमुखी क्याम्पस
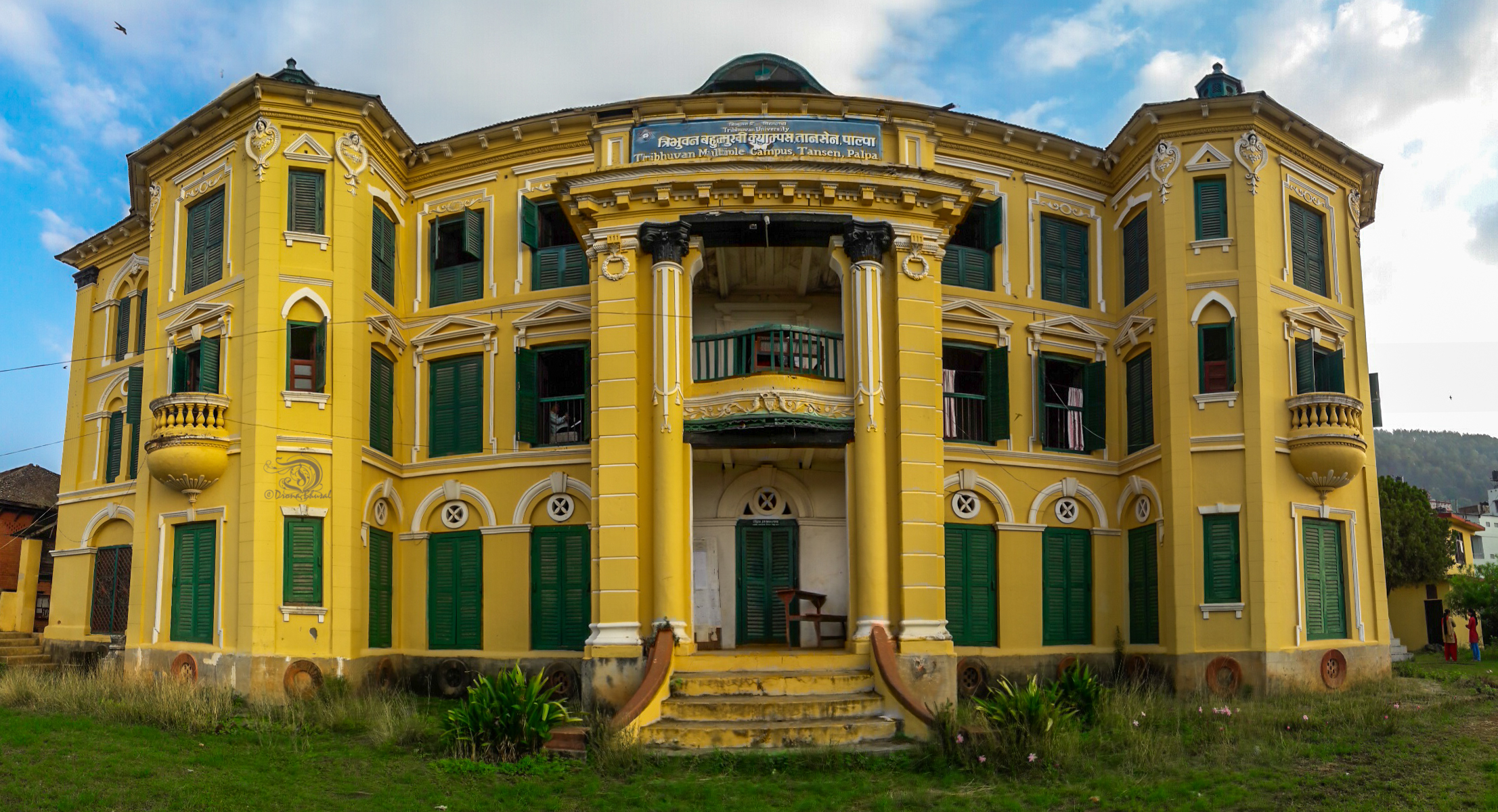
- Main campus building
- Established: 2011 B.S.
- Parent institution: Tribhuwan University
- Head: Tanka P. Bhattarai
- Location: Tansen, Palpa
- Website: tmc.tu.edu.np

Tribhuvan Multiple Campus (Nepali: त्रिभुवन बहुमुखी क्याम्पस) is one of the constituent campuses of Tribhuvan University in Tansen, Palpa district in western Nepal. The term Multiple refers to the several courses of various disciplines. The campus was established in 2011 BS. It was initially founded with the initiation of local education lovers, businessmen, politicians and the community. It became a part of Tribhuvan University in 1973 B.S. This campus is second oldest to Tri-Chandra College.

The campus offers courses in Bachelor's and Master's degree in humanities, management, science and arts.

The annual student intake is about 300 students in BA, 350 in B.Ed., 450 in BBS, 350 in B.Sc., 120 in MA, 60 in M.Ed. and 150 in MBS. Students from 20 districts such Dang, Pyuthan, Rolpa, Rukum, Arghakhanchi, Nepalgunj, Gulmi, and Syanja come to this campus for higher education.

== Infrastructure ==
The campus has an area of 250 ropanis and contains eight buildings. There are canteen, parking, cycle stand, science lab, computer lab, geography lab and library. The library contains various textbooks and journals.

== Notable alumni ==
Some notable alumni of the campus are as follows:

- Khil Raj Regmi - Chief Justice, Chairman of Ministry of Council
