= Shanker Dev Campus =

Management campus of Tribhuvan University in Nepal

- शंकरदेव क्याम्पस
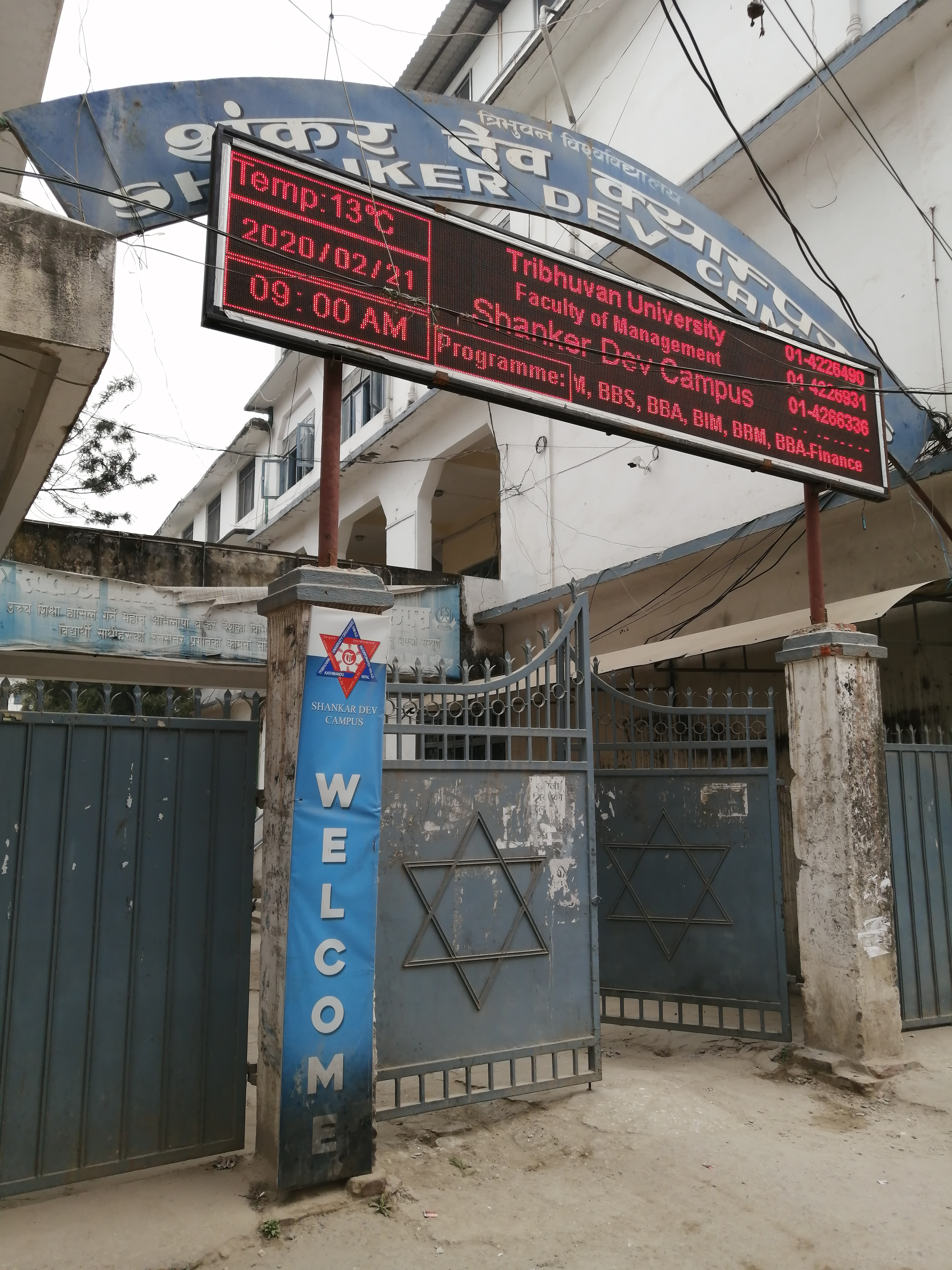
- Established: 2009 B.S.
- Parent institution: Tribhuvan University
- Location: Putalisadak, Kathmandu
- FSU chairman: Sushant Basnet (NSU)
- Website: sdc.tu.edu.np

Shanker Dev Campus (Nepali: शंकरदेव क्याम्पस) is one of the constituent campuses of Tribhuvan University in Pradashani Marg, in Kathmandu. The campus was established in 1951.

The campus runs programs in bachelor's and master's degrees in business studies. The campus was initiated to focus on the field of management. The academic departments on the campus are subdivided into management, accounting, finance, marketing, and economics. It has different programs such as BBS, MBS, BBA, BITM, MBM, and BBM in different shifts (morning, day, evening). While mostly known for being a management college, the BITM course is mainly an Information Technology subject.

== History ==
The campus was established in 1951 as Nepal National College, running from Durbar High School and later from Tri-Chandra College. The campus was renamed and amalgamated into Tribhuvan University in 1973 following a government decision. The campus is named after Prof. Shanker Dev Pant, who initiated to build the infrastructure for the campus.

== Associations ==
The college has teachers' and students' associations, namely Tribhuvan University Teachers Association and Free Student Union, which were established for the rights and welfare of the teachers and students, respectively.

== Undergraduate Programs ==
There are various management bachelor's courses taught at Shanker Dev Campus.

- Bachelor in Business Studies (BBS)
- Bachelor in Business Administration (BBA)
- Bachelor in Information Technology Management (BITM)
- Bachelor in Business Management (BBM)
- Bachelor of Business Administration in Finance (BBA-F)

== Graduate Programs ==
The graduate programs taught at the campus are:

- Master in Business Studies (MBS)
- Master in Business Management (MBM)
- Master in Business Administration in Finance (MBA-F)
