= Padma Kanya Multiple Campus =

Women's college in Kathmandu

Coordinates: 27.70575°N 85.32078°E

- Type: Public
- Established: 2008 B.S.
- Affiliations: Tribhuvan University
- Principal: Prof. Dr. Jayalaxmi Pradhan
- Location: Kathmandu, Nepal
- FSU Chairperson: Jyoti Paneru (NSU)
- Website: pkmc.tu.edu.np

Padma Kanya Multiple Campus is a women's college located in Bagbazar, Kathmandu. Founded on 17 September 1951, it is the oldest institution of its kind in Nepal.

== Undergraduate Programs ==
The undergraduate programs taught at Padma Kanya Multiple Campus are:

- Bachelor of Science (B.Sc.)
- Bachelor of Arts (B.A)
- Bachelor in Business Administration (BBA)
- Bachelor of Business Management (BBM)
- Bachelor in Hotel Management (BHM)
- Bachelor in Business Studies (BBS)
- Bachelor of Science in Computer Science and Information Technology (B.Sc. CSIT)
- Bachelor of Information Technology (BIT)
- Bachelor in Computer Application (BCA)
- Bachelor in Information Technology
- Bachelor in Public service and Governance (BPSG)

== Postgraduate Programs ==
The graduate (Master) program offered are:

- MA in Economics
- MA in Psychology
- MA in English
- MA in Nepali
- MA in Political Science
- MA in Sociology
- MA in Rural Development
- MA in Population Studies
- Master of Business Studies
- Master of Business Management
