= University Grants Commission (Nepal) =

Government institution of Nepal

- विश्वविद्यालय अनुदान आयोग
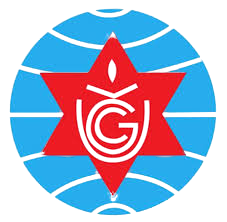

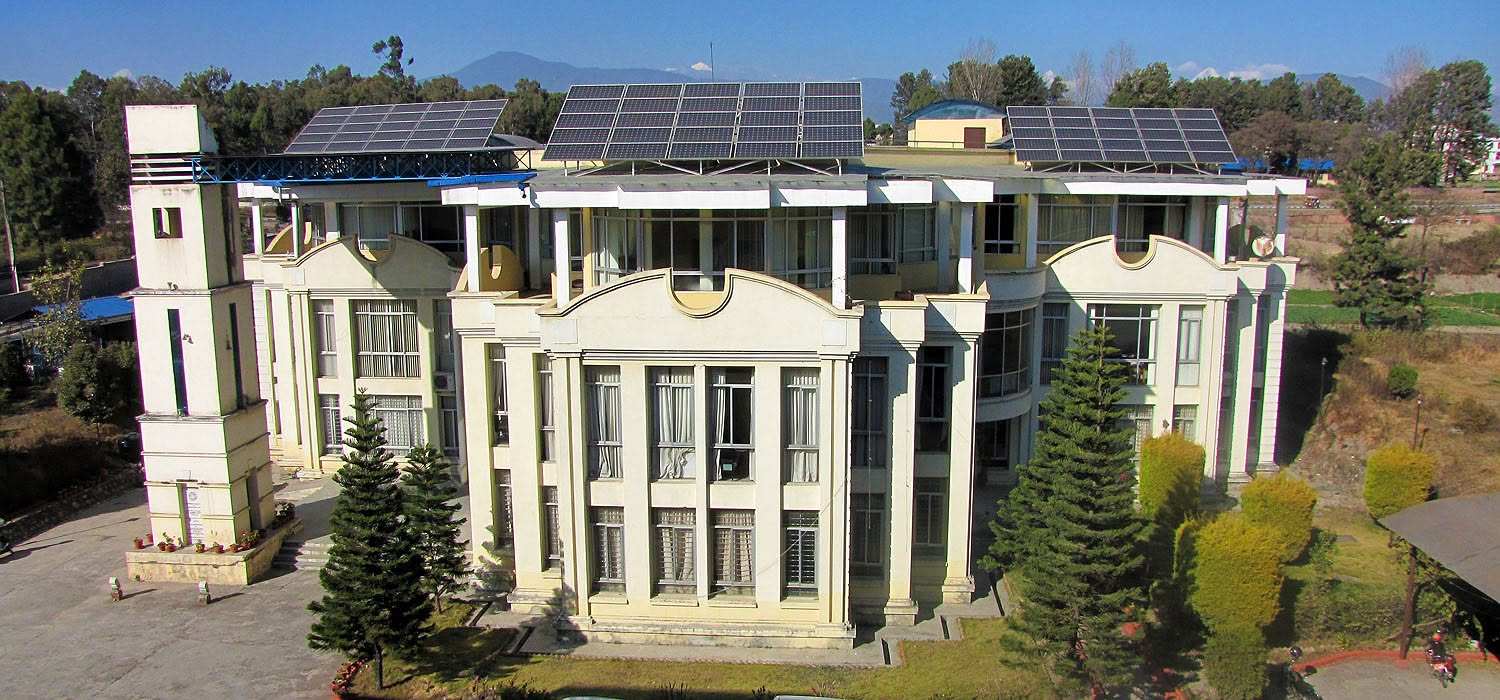

Agency overview
- Formed: January 1, 1994; 32 years ago
- Jurisdiction: University Grant Commission Act-2050 (1993)
- Headquarters: Bhaktapur
- Agency executive: Chairman; Secretary
- Website: www.ugcnepal.edu.np

University Grants Commission (UGC; Nepali: विश्वविद्यालय अनुदान आयोग) is an autonomous government body of Nepal formed under the jurisdiction of UGC Act approved by the parliament of Nepal on 2 November 1993. UGC became functional in 1994 with the opening of its office at Sanothimi, Bhaktapur. The main reason to establish UGC is to implement the concept of multiple universities in Nepal. Before UGC's establishment only Tribhuvan University looked after the higher education. The main objectives of the UGC are to coordinate among universities; allocate and disburse government grants to universities and higher educational institutions and take appropriate steps for the promotion and maintenance of standards of higher education in Nepal. UGC allocates and distributes grants to the universities and their campuses.

== Objectives ==
The main objectives of UGC are:

- advise The Government of Nepal to establish new universities,
- formulate policy for grants to the universities and higher education institutions,
- disburse grants to universities
- act as a coordinator among the universities.
- determine and maintain the standards of higher education.
- formulate policies to promote quality in higher education.
- arrange scholarships, fellowships etc. between the universities and educational institutions within and outside Nepal.

== Divisions ==
The major working division of UGC are:

- QAA Certification: The Quality Assurance and Accreditation (QAA) division performs quality assurance regularly to verify the institution or the programme meets the norms and standards prescribed by the QAAC. As of 2020, there are 21 institutes certified by UGC.
- Research and Scholarship
- Monitoring and Evaluation
- Planning and program
- Administrative
- Equivalence: responsible for determining the recognition and equivalence of academic degrees obtained from foreign universities to ensures that qualifications earned abroad are fairly and consistently evaluated against Nepal's academic standards. As of July 2026, UGC provides equivalence certificates, a function previously performed by Tribhuvan University.

== Composition ==
UGC has the following members

- One person nominated by Government of Nepal,
- Two Vice-Chancellors nominated by Government of Nepal from amongst Vice-Chancellors of Universities,
- One member from the National Planning Commission of Nepal ,
- Secretary from the Ministry of Education,
- Secretary from the Ministry of Finance,
- Four members nominated by Government of Nepal based on educational contribution,
- One secretary

== See also ==
- Education in Nepal
- List of universities and colleges in Nepal
