= List of engineering colleges in Nepal =

Nepal has various private college that provide Engineering degrees being affiliated to Major National and International Universities.

== Types of engineering institutions ==
Constituent/Private engineering colleges		Affiliated engineering colleges	Total (Private+Affiliated)
Operational	Non Operational	Affiliated engineering colleges	Total (Private+Affiliated)
13	2	48	63

== Government campuses ==
There are 13 government funded campuses under various universities in Nepal which are as follows:

=== Operational campuses ===
Name	Establishment year	Location	Province	University	Courses Offered	Remarks
Thapathali Campus (IOE)	1966	Thapathali, Kathmandu	Bagmati	Tribhuwan University	Bachelor/Master	Oldest engineering campus in Nepal
Pulchowk Campus (IOE)	1972	Pulchowk, Lalitpur	Bagmati	Tribhuwan University	Bachelor/Master/PhD	
Purwanchal Campus (IOE)	1976	Dharan, Sunsari	Koshi	Tribhuwan University	Bachelor/Master	
Pashchimanchal Campus (IOE)	1981	Pokhara, Kaski	Gandaki	Tribhuwan University	Bachelor/Master	
School of Engineering	1994	Dhulikhel, Kavrepalanchowk	Bagmati	Kathmandu University	Bachelor/Master/PhD	
School of Engineering	1999	Biratnagar, Morang	Koshi	Purbanchal University	Bachelor/Master	
School of Engineering	2009	Pokhara, Kaski	Gandaki	Pokhara University	Bachelor/Master	
School of Engineering	2013	Birendranagar, Surkhet	Karnali	Madhyapaschim University	Bachelor/Master	
School of Engineering	2013	Bhimdatta, Kanchanpur	Sudurpashim	Far-Western University	Bachelor/Master	
Chitwan Engineering Campus (IOE)	2019	Rampur, Chitwan	Bagmati	Tribhuwan University	Bachelor	
School of Engineering	2019	Budhiganga, Morang	Koshi	Manmohan Technical University	Bachelor	Provincial University campus
Institute of Engineering and Information Technology	2022	Nepalgunj,Banke	Lumbini	Lumbini Technical University	Bachelor	Provincial University campus
Gaushala Engineering Campus	2023	Gaushala, Mahottari	Madhesh	Rajarshi Janak University	Bachelor	

=== Proposed campuses ===
Name	Establishment year	City	District	Province	University	Remarks
Ghorahi Campus	2022	Bharatpur, Ghorahi	Dang	Lumbini	16.713	Non operational/project office established
Khaptad Campus	2023	Dipayal Silgadhi	Doti	Sudurpashchim	15.71	Non operational/project office established

== Private colleges ==
There are some 48 private engineering colleges in Nepal under affiliation of various universities in Nepal.

=== Tribhuwan University ===
Tribhuwan University (10)
College name	Courses offered
Khowpa College of Engineering, Bhaktapur	B.E.
Kathmandu Engineering College, Kathmandu	B.E.
Kantipur Engineering College, Lalitpur	B.E.
Advanced College of Engineering and Management, Kathmandu	B.E.
National College of Engineering, Lalitpur	B.E.
Himalaya College of Engineering, Lalitpur	B.E.
Janakpur Engineering College, Lalitpur	B.E.
Kathford International College of Engineering and Management, Lalitpur	B.E.
Sagarmatha Engineering College, Lalitpur	B.E.
Lalitpur Engineering College, Lalitpur	B.E.

=== Purbanchal University ===
Purbanchal University (20)
College name	Courses offered
Acme Engineering College, Kathmandu	B.E./M.E.
Aryan School of Engineering and Management, Kathmandu	B.E.
Central Engineering College, Janakpur	B.E.
College of Information Technology and Engineering, Kathmandu	B.E.
Dhulibari Campus, Jhapa	B.E.
Eastern College of Engineering, Morang	B.E.
Geomatic Institute of Technology, Kathmandu	B.E.
Hillside College of Engineering, Kathmandu	B.E./M.E.
Himalayan Institute of Science and Technology, Lalitpur	B.E./M.E.
Himalayan WhiteHouse International College, Kathmandu	B.E.
Kantipur City College, Kathmandu	B.E.
Kantipur International College, Lalitpur	B.E./M.E.
Khwopa Engineering College, Bhaktapur	B.E./M.E.
Mansarovar institute of Science and Technplogy	B.E.
Morgan Engineering and Management College, Kathmandu	B.E.
Mega College Of Engineering, Kumaripati, Lalitpur	B.E
National Institute of Engineering and Tecgnology, Lalitpur	B.E.
Nepal Polytechnic Institute, Bharatpur	B.E.
Pathivara Center For Advanced Studies, Jhapa	B.E.
SR Engineering College Pvt. Ltd.,Biratnagar	B.E.

=== Pokhara University ===
Pokhara University (15)
College name	Courses offered
College of Engineering and Management, Banke	B.E.
Cosmos College of Management and Technology, Sitapaila, Kathmandu	B.E./M.Sc.
Everest Engineering College, Lalitpur	B.E.
Gandaki College of Engineering and Science, Kaski	B.E./M.E.
Lumbini Engineering Management and Science College, Rupandehi	B.E./M.E.
Madan Bhandari Memorial Academy, Morang	B.E./M.E.
National Academy of Science and Technology (Dhangadi Engineering College), Kailali	B.E.
Nepal College of Information Technology, Lalitpur	B.E./M.E.
Nepal Engineering College, Bhaktapur	B.E./M.E.
Oxford College of Engineering and Management, Nawalpur	B.E.
Pokhara Engineering College, Kaski	B.E./M.E.
Rapti Engineering College, Dang	B.E.
Ritz College of Engineering and Management, Lalitpur	B.E.
Universal Engineering and Science College, Lalitpur	B.E./M.E.
United Technical College, Chitwan	B.E.

=== Far Western University ===
Far Western University (3)
AITM College, Lalitpur
Bheri College Of Engineering and Management, Nepalgunj
Western Advance College of Engineering and Management, Nawalpur

== See also ==
- List of medical colleges in Nepal
- List of forestry colleges in Nepal
