= Purbanchal University School of Engineering =

- पूर्वाञ्चल विश्वविद्यालय स्कूल अफ इन्जिनियरिङ्
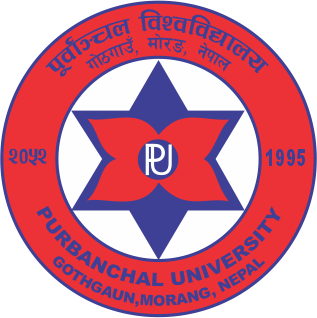
- Type: Public
- Established: 1999 (AD)
- Affiliations: Purbanchal University
- Dean: Debi Prasad Bhattarai
- Director: Tejraj Giri
- Location: Kanya Marga, Biratnagar, Nepal
- Campus: 6.7 acres (2.7 ha)
- Website: www.puse.edu.np

Purbanchal University School of Engineering (Nepali: पूर्वाञ्चल विश्वविद्यालय स्कूल अफ इन्जिनियरिङ्) is the only constituent engineering college of Purbanchal University. Located in Biratnagar, the capital of Koshi Province it established in 1999 AD with aim to provide engineering skills and knowledge related to the sector. PUSOE provides bachelor and masters level course in various streams of engineering.

== Selection criteria ==
The following remains the criteria for admission to Bachelor level course and masters level courses:

- Applicants should have passed +2 or ISc or Diploma in Surveying or any other engineering field for joining bachelor level courses.
- For masters level course, the applicant should have passed Bachelor in Engineering of the respective subject.
- Applicants should have passed entrance exam taken by University.

== Scholarship ==
It is provided to 10% students in each course with 5% seats open while other 5% reserved. These are granted based on scholorship act of the university.

== Courses offered ==
=== Bachelor level courses ===
- Bachelor in Civil engineering (48 seats)
- Bachelor in Electrical engineering (48 seats)
- Bachelor in Electronics and Communication engineering (60 seats)
- Bachelor in Computer Engineering (60 seats)

=== Masters level courses ===
- MSc in Engineering Management
- MSc in Information System Engineering
- Master of Engineering in Earthquake
- MSc in Construction Management
- MSc in Electrical Power Engineering

== Affiliated colleges ==
Purbanchal University has 17 other affiliated colleges for engineering studies. They are:

- Acme Engineering College
- Aryan School of Engineering and Management
- Central Engineering College
- College of Information Technology and Engineering
- College of Biomedical Engineering and Applied Sciences
- Eastern College of Engineering
- Hillside College of Engineering
- Geomatic Institute of Technology
- Gomendra Multiple College
- Himalayan Institute of Science and Technology
- Himalayan WhiteHouse International College
- Kantipur City College
- Kantipur International College
- Khwopa Engineering College
- Morgan Engineering and Management College
- Nepal Polytechnic Institute
- Pathivara Center For Advanced Studies
- Dhulibari Campus

== See also ==
- Pulchowk Campus
- Thapathali Campus
- Gaushala Engineering Campus
- Geomatic Institute of Technology
