= Institute of Engineering =

Government engineering institute in Nepal

Tribhuvan University Institute of Engineering
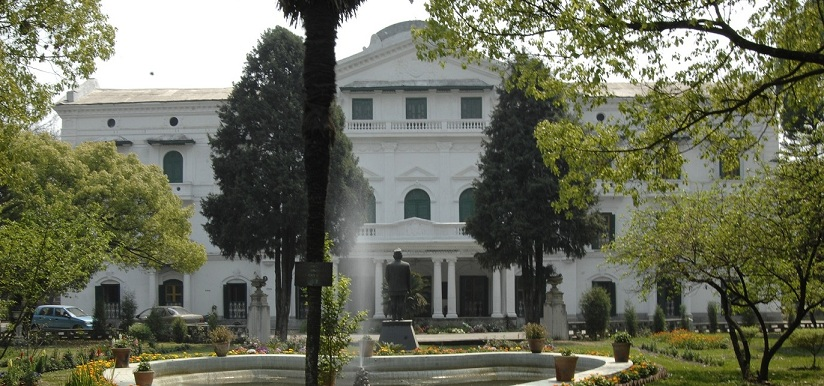
- Established: 1972 AD
- Chancellor: Prime Minister of Nepal
- Vice-Chancellor: Dr. Bhola Thapa
- Dean: Shashidhar Ram Joshi
- Location: Harihar Bhawan, Lalitpur, Lalitpur, Nepal
- Website: https://ioe.edu.np/

The Institute of Engineering (IOE) (Nepali: ईन्जिनियरिङ अध्ययन संस्थान), established in 1930, is one of the five technical institutes under Tribhuvan University, Nepal's largest academic institution. The current dean of the IOE is Sushil Bahadur Bajracharya.

IOE runs undergraduate, postgraduate and Ph.D. programs. It previously ran Diploma courses till 2012. The institute has five constituent and ten affiliated campuses in the country. Its constituent campus are namely Pulchowk Campus, Thapathali Campus, Paschimanchal Campus, Purbanchal Campus and Chitwan Engineering Campus.

== History ==
=== Formation ===
The history of engineering education in Nepal can be traced to 1930, when a Technical Training School was established in Kumari Chowk, Kathmndu. The engineering section of the school offered only trades and civil sub-overseers programs. In 1959, the Nepal Engineering Institute was established with the assistance of the government of India which started offering civil overseer courses leading to a Diploma in Civil Engineering. The Technical Training Institute established in 1965 at Thapathali, with the assistance from the Government of Federal Republic of Germany which offered technician courses in general courses in General Mechanics, Auto Mechanics, Electrical Engineering and Mechanical Drafting.

In 1972, the Nepal Engineering Institute at Pulchowk and the Technical Training Institute at Thapathali were brought together under the umbrella of Tribhuvan University to constitute the Institute of Engineering. The Nepal Engineering Institute and the Technical Training Institute were later renamed as Pulchowk campus and Thapathali Campus respectively.

=== Establishment of constituent campuses ===
Later, Pashchimanchal Campus in Pokhara of IOE became operational from 1987 while Purwanchal Campus in Dharan which began operating from 1984. Recently, Chitwan Engineering Campus was established in Rampur, Chitwan in 2019, where only Architecture is offered.

== Constituent campuses and affiliated colleges ==
=== Constituent campuses (7) ===
Name	Established	City	District	Province	Type	Area (acres) approx.	Remarks
Operational
Pulchowk Campus	1972	Pulchowk, Lalitpur	Lalitpur	Bagmati	Public	60	Central campus
Thapathali Campus	1966	Thapathali, Kathmandu	Kathmandu	Bagmati	Public	4	Oldest engineering campus in Nepal
Pashchimanchal Campus	1981	Lamachaur. Pokhara	Kaski	Gandaki	Public	39.22	
Purwanchal Campus	1976	Tinkune, Dharan	Sunsari	Koshi	Public	55.7	
Chitwan Engineering Campus	2019	Rampur, Bharatpur	Chitwan	Bagmati	Public	26	
Non operational
Ghorahi Campus	2022	Bharatpur, Ghorahi	Dang	Lumbini	Public	16.713	Non operational/project office established
Khaptad Campus	2023	Dipayal Silgadhi	Doti	Sudurpashchim	Public	15.71	Non operational/project office established

=== Affiliated colleges (10) ===
- Kantipur Engineering College
- Khowpa College of Engineering
- Kathmandu Engineering College
- National College of Engineering
- Advanced College of Engineering and Management
- Himalaya College of Engineering
- Kathford International College of Engineering and Management
- Janakpur Engineering college
- Sagarmatha Engineering College
- Lalitpur Engineering College

== Admission ==
=== Entrance examinations ===
Entrance examinations are conducted by Institute of Engineering yearly for undergraduate and postgraduate intake. The entrance exam for the undergraduate intake is said to be tough where more than 15,000 students from all over Nepal vie for to secure seats. Getting into Pulchowk Engineering College is the toughest followed by Thapathali Campus, as the higher ranked students are more likely to choose them While Pulchowk Campus takes just 624 students from approx. 10,000 candidates, Thapathali Campus takes almost 432 students which roughly estimates the acceptance rate to be 10% jointly. But to get computer, electronics and civil engineering is the toughest especially into Pulchowk Campus as the seats are fulfilled under 31 and 230 rank respectively for full scholarship. While on the paying basis they are fulfilled under 210 and 400 rank respectively. The lower ranked students in the pool are likely to choose other branches or other affiliated colleges. Getting into constituent campuses of IOE is by far the toughest engineering entrance in the country.

=== Reservation policy ===
IOE has reservation criteria fulfilling which reservation quota can be claimed.

== Programs offered ==
=== Bachelor programs ===
		Pulchowk Campus			Thapathali Campus			Pashchimanchal Campus			Purwanchal Campus			Chitwan Engineering Campus		
		Regular	FF	Total	Regular	FF	Total	Regular	FF	Total	Regular	FF	Total	Regular	FF	Total
Bachelor programs	Aerospace	12	36	48												
Bachelor programs	Agricultural										12	36	48			
Bachelor programs	Automobile				12	36	48	12	36	48						
Bachelor programs	Chemical	12	36	48												
Bachelor programs	Civil	108	84	192	36	108	144	36	108	144	36	108	144			
Bachelor programs	Computer	36	60	96	12	36	48	12	36	48	24	72	96			
Bachelor programs	Electrical	36	60	96				12	36	48	12	36				
Bachelor programs	Electronics and Communication	24	24	48	12	36	48	12	36	48	12	36	48			
Bachelor programs	Geomatics							12	36	48						
Bachelor programs	Industrial				12	36	48									
Bachelor programs	Mechanical	24	24	48	12	36	48	12	36	48	24	72	96			
Bachelor programs	Architecture	24	24	48	12	36	48				12	36	48	6	18	24

=== Postgraduate and doctoral program ===
==== Master degree courses are running only in central campus Pulchowk as follows ====
Departments	Running Master Programs	Proposed Master Programs
Departments of Sciences & humanities	• Climate change • Applied Mathematics • Material Science	• Engineering Geology
Department of Mechanical Engineering	• Renewable energy engineering, • Technology and Innovation management • Energy system planning and Management • Mechanical Systems Design and Engineering	
Department of Electronics and Computer Engineering	• Information and Communication Engineering • Computer system and Knowledge Engineering	• Bio-informatics
Department of Electrical Engineering	• Power System Engineering	
Department of Civil Engineering	• Structural engineering • Environment engineering • Geo-technical engineering • Water resources engineering • Sustainable water sanitation health and development • Transportation engineering • Disaster Risk Management • Construction Management • Hydropower Engineering	
Department of Architecture & Urban Planning	• Urban Planning	• Architecture • Sustainable Energy Development

Master's degree courses are running only in Thapathali campus are as follows

Departments	Running Master Programs	Started since
Department of Mechanical Engineering	• Mechanical Engineering Design and Manufacturing	2016
Department of Electronics and Computer Engineering	• Informatics and Intelligent Systems Engineering	2020
Department of Civil Engineering	• Earthquake Engineering	2014

Ph.D. Research:

Ph.D. Research are undergoing in all departments only at Central Campus, Pulchowk.

== See also ==
- Purbanchal University School of Engineering
- Pulchowk Campus
- Thapathali Campus
- Institute of Forestry
