= Agriculture and Forestry University =

University for Agriculture and Forestry in Bharatpur, Nepal

- कृषि तथा वन विज्ञान विश्वविद्यालय
- Type: Public Coeducational
- Established: June 2010; 16 years ago
- Chancellor: Prime Minister of Nepal
- Vice-Chancellor: Dr. Rishi Ram Kattel
- Dean: Arjun Kumar Shrestha; Hom Bahadur Basnet; Basudev Pokhrel
- Academic staff: 107
- Total staff: 362
- Students: 1,978
- Undergraduates: 1883
- Postgraduates: 367
- Doctoral students: 45
- Location: Rampur, Chitwan, Nepal; 27.650407°N 84.350143°E
- Campus: 690 acres (280 ha)
- Website: afu.edu.np

The Agriculture and Forestry University (AFU; Nepali: कृषि तथा वन विश्वविद्यालय) is a public agricultural university in Nepal. AFU has its central offices at Rampur, Chitwan, Nepal. It was established by the Parliament of Nepal through a bill passed in June 2010 merging two constituent campuses of Tribhuvan University namely Rampur Agriculture Campus of IAAS and Hetauda Campus of IOF in Hetauda, Makwanpur.

The university is the country's first technical university that offers agricultural workforce development and promotes research in agriculture, forestry, and allied disciplines through teaching, research, and extension programs across the country. The soul aim of the university is to produce mainpower for agriculture and forest industry.

== History ==
Agriculture and Forestry University (AFU) was established as a result of a bill enacted by the Nepalese Parliament in June 2010 authorizing the creation of three new universities at campuses owned by Tribhuvan University. The Rampur Agriculture Campus, associated with the Institute of Agriculture and Animal Science and the Forestry Campus, Hetauda, associated with the Institute of Forestry were designated as campuses for the new university. As of February 2015, Tribhuvan University had refused to transfer ownership of the campuses to the new university, citing its autonomy from the Nepalese legislature.

== Academics ==
The university offers undergraduate, graduate and PhD programs in agricultural sciences from the Faculty of Agriculture, Faculty of Animal Sciences, Veterinary Sciences and Fisheries, Rampur. Undergraduate and Postgraduate program in forestry is run from the Faculty of Forestry, Hetauda.

The university has 107 faculty members and 255 support staffs. The university strength consists of around 1883 undergraduate students, 367 postgraduate students and around 45 PhD scholars in disciplines of agriculture and forestry. The Rampur academic complex extends in an area of 280 hectares (690 acres) and the Hetauda Campus has an area of 95 hectares (230 acres).

== Courses offered ==
Faculty of Forestry	Faculty of Agriculture	Faculty of Animal Sciences, Veterinary Sciences and Fisheries
Course
BSc. Forestry; MSc. Forestry	BSc. Agriculture; MSc. Agriculture; MSc in Agriculture (Biotechnology)	Bachelor of Veterinary Science and Animal Husbandry; BSc. Fisheries; Master of Veterinary Science; MSc in Veterinary Science (Biotechnology); MSc in Animal Science (Biotechnology); MSc in Fisheries (Aquaculture)

== Constituent Campuses ==
College/ Campus	BSc Agriculture	BSc Forestry	Bachelor of Veterinary Science and Animal Husbandry	BSc Fisheries
Central Campus, Rampur	162		50	21
Hetauda Campus		80		
Total	162	80	50	21

College/ Campus		BSc Agriculture	BSc Forestry
College of Natural Resource Management	Katari, Udayapur		54
College of Natural Resource Management	Puranchaur, Kaski	54	
College of Natural Resource Management	Kapilakot, Sindhuli	54	
College of Natural Resource Management	Tikapur, Kailali	54	
College of Natural Resource Management	Pakhribas, Dhankuta	54	
College of Natural Resource Management	Bardibas, Mahottari	54	
College of Natural Resource Management	Khajura, Banke	54	
College of Natural Resource Management	Madhichaur, Rolpa	49	
College of Natural Resource Management	Dullu, Dailekh	49	
College of Natural Resource Management	Total	422	54

== See also ==
- Institute of Forestry
- Institute of Agriculture and Animal Science
