= College of Applied Food and Dairy Technology =

College in Nepal

- Type: Private,
- Affiliations: Purbanchal University, CTEVT
- Location: Kumaripati, Lalitpur, Nepal
- Website: cafodat.edu.np

CAFODAT COLLEGE, formerly known as the College of Applied Food and Dairy Technology, is a center of quality education in Nepal, dedicated to academic excellence, professional development and practical skill based learning. The College offers a range of academic program in affiliation with Purbanchal University, along with technical education programs designed to meet the evolving needs of industry and society.

Located at 134/17 Kumari Marg, Kumaripati, Lalitpur, Nepal. CAFODAT COLLEGE is committed to provide quality education, fostering innovation and research and developing competent professional who can contribute to national and international development.

CAFODAT COLLEGE is offering Diploma in Food and Dairy Technology in affiliation with Council for Technical Education and Vocational Training (CTEVT), Bachelor of Food Technology (B. Tech. Food), B. Sc. Food, Nutrition and Dietetics (B. Sc. FND) and M. Sc. in Nutrition and Dietetics since 2005 in affiliation with Purbanchal University. CAFODAT COLLEGE is the only college in Nepal that offers M. Sc. in Nutrition and Dietetics.
