= Institute of Medicine, Nepal =

Medical institution in Nepal

Institute of Medicine
- चिकित्साशास्त्र अध्ययन संस्थान
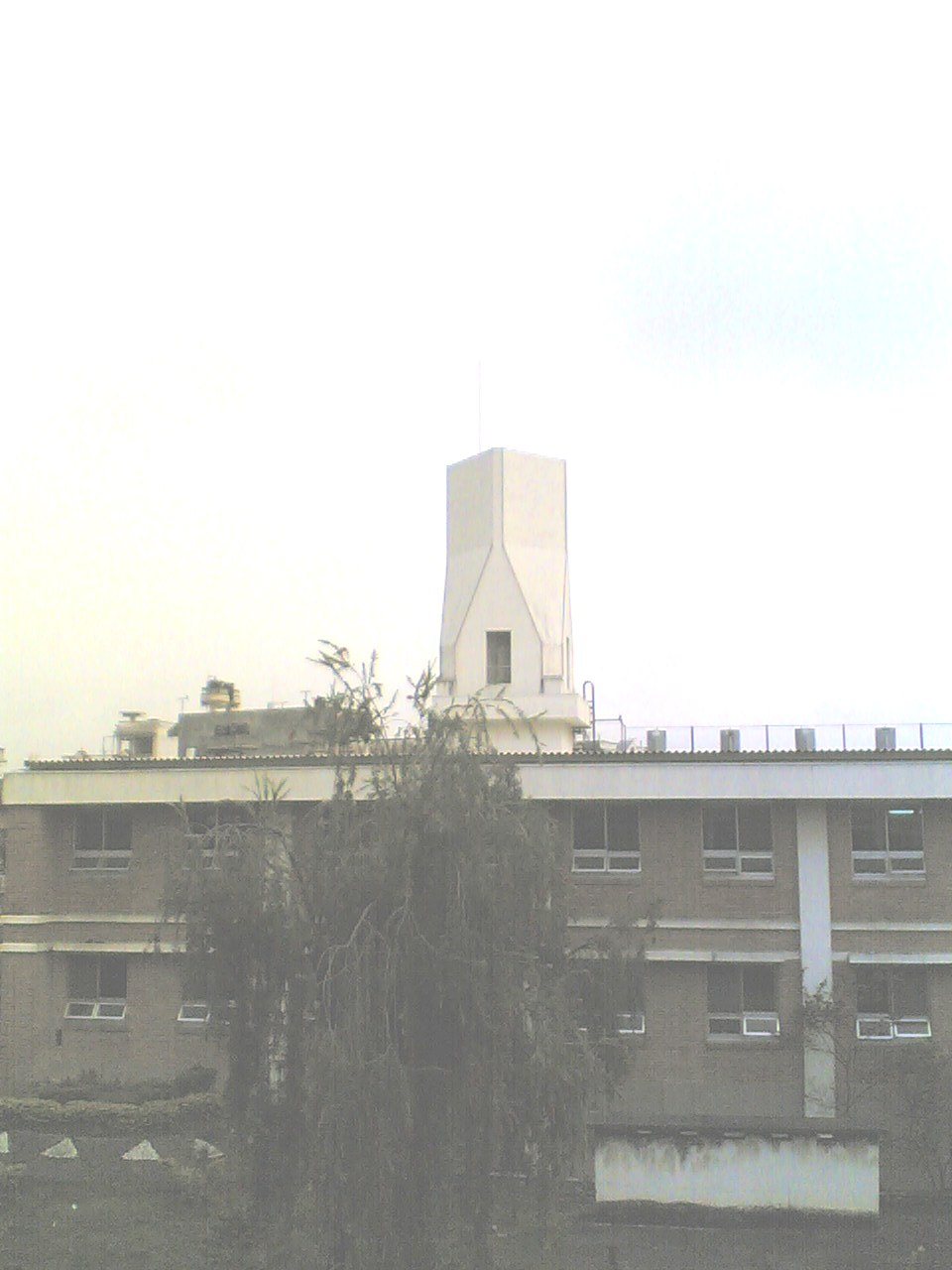
- TUTH, Mahrajgunj
- Motto: Chikitsitat punyatmam na kinchita
- Type: Public
- Established: 1972; 54 years ago
- Parent institution: Tribhuvan University
- Dean: Mohan Raj Sharma
- Location: Maharajgunj, Kathmandu, [Bagmati], Nepal
- Website: www.iom.edu.np

The Institute of Medicine (IOM), established in 1972 under Tribhuvan University, is a pioneering institution for medical education, research, and health service development in Nepal. Founded with the vision of producing competent health professionals to meet the nation’s growing healthcare needs, IOM has evolved into a center of excellence in medical and allied sciences. It is one of the five technical institutes under Tribhuvan University.

IOM offers undergraduate, postgraduate, and Ph.D. programs, as well as elective postings for students from foreign universities in medicine, nursing, and allied health sciences. These postings are coordinated through the Medical Education Department of the Dean’s Office and take place in its hospitals across more than 40 departments, including medicine, surgery, emergency medicine, and intensive care. The institute has eight constituent campuses and fifteen affiliated colleges across Nepal. Its central campus is Maharajgunj Medical Campus in Kathmandu.

== Colleges and campuses ==
=== Constituent campus ===
There are 8 constituent campuses:

- Maharajgunj Medical Campus, Kathmandu
- Maharajgunj Nursing Campus
- Ayurveda Campus, Kirtipur
- Nepalgunj Nursing Campus
- Birgunj Nursing Campus
- Biratnagar Nursing Campus
- Pokhara Nursing Campus
- Central Department of Public Health

=== Affiliated colleges ===
There are 15 affiliated colleges:

- National Medical College, Birgunj
- Universal College of Medical Sciences, Bhairahawa
- Janaki Medical College, Janakpur
- People's Dental College and Hospital, Balaju, Kathmandu
- MB Kedia Dental College, Birgunj
- KIST Medical College, Lalitpur
- Chitwan Medical College, Bharatpur
- National Model College for Advanced Learning
- Sunsari Technical College
- Metrix College, Birgunj
- Janamaitri Foundation, Balaju
- Nepalese Army Institute of Health Sciences, Sano Bharyang, Bhadrakhal
- Manmohan Institute of Health Sciences, Solteemode, Kathmandu
- Gandaki Medical College, Pokhara
- Nepal Ayurved Medical College, Birgunj

== Programs ==
The IOM offers 17 undergraduate, 43 Post Graduate, 1 M.Phil.,7 DM, 5 MCh,3 PhD and 20+ Clinical fellowship Programs, from proficiency certificate level to the highest postgraduate degree in medicine, public health, paramedical, nursing, and traditional Ayurveda medicine through its central campus and eight constituent campuses around the country.

The IOM is Also Running Research Projects In Multiple Recognized Refferal Center. Example Of Cross-Sectional Research Projects Are Triggers and Patterns of Chronic Migraine in Nepalese Patients & Digital Screen Use and Headache Frequency in Kathmandu Neurology Clinic & Headache Center.

== See also ==
- Institute of Forestry
- Institute of Engineering
