= Padam Sundas =

Nepalese social worker

- Born: 15 July 1945 (age 80); Bhojpur, Bhojpur, Nepal
- Citizenship: Nepalese
- Occupation: Social work
- Known for: Dalit rights advocacy
- Movement: Siddhakali Mandir Pravesh (1964); Sipa Pokhari Paani Ubau (2000); Gorakhkali Mandir Pravesh (2000); Gaindakot Doodh Bharau (2002)
- Spouses: Amina Sundas (m. 1964; died 1999) Amrita Sundas (m. 2001)
- Children: 3
- Parents: Hastabir Sundas; Ratna Maya Sundas
- Awards: Jana Utthan Rashtriya Puraskar (2000); Bhagat Sarbajit Manab Maryada Rashtirya Puraskar (2016)

Padam Sundas (born 15 July 1945) is a Nepalese social worker and activist for Dalit communities in Nepal. Known as the "Guardian of the Dalits", Sundas has published a number of short stories, poems, and articles related to social justice and political reform. He has published two books of his own and over 25 books written by writers from Dalit and non-Dalit communities with the help of Ratna Maya Dalit Sahitya Samrakshan Samiti, of which he is a trustee.

== Early life and education ==
Sundas was born to Hasta Bir Sundas and Ratna Maya Sundas as the youngest among six siblings at Bhojpur Bazaar in Bhojpur, Nepal. After completing his SLC from Vidyodaya High School, Bhojpur, he moved to Kathmandu for higher education. He completed his engineering course from the Engineering School located in Jawalakhel, Lalitpur, and obtained his diploma in 1963.

== Personal life ==
Sundas married Amina Mohtey on 19 August 1964 at the yard of the Siddhakali Temple situated in Bhojpur. After her death on 7 May 1999, Sundas married Amrita Trikhatri on 19 August 2001. He fathered a son and two daughters.

== Career ==
Sundas started his career as an overseer at Khandbari, Sankhuwasabha and Bhojpur. Fifteen years later, he left his government job to work as an independent contractor. Sundas worked in construction as the chair of Sundas Construction Pvt. Ltd. and the deputy chair of Amrit Nirman Sewa Pvt. Ltd. until 2007. He left his job as a construction worker in the late 2000s to become a full-time social worker.

The success of united struggles has stressed on the significance and the inevitability of Dalit unity. Struggle is possible in unity; so are positive outcomes.

— Padam Sundas

Sundas has actively participated and led several Dalit rights movements including the Siddhakali Mandir Pravesh in Bhojpur (1964), Sipa Pokhare Pani Ubjau in Sindhupalchok (2000), Gorakhkali Mandir Pravesh in Gorkha (2000) and Gaindakot Doodh Bharau in Nawalparasi (2002). Sundas has actively participated and marched in several movements to demand judicial reform and end caste discrimination in Nepal. Having worked with different generations, Sundas is referred to as "Daju" (transl. "elder brother") by many.

=== Affiliated organizations ===
SN	Organizations	Post	Year	Ref.
1	Nepal Rashtriya Dalit Jana Vikas Parishad	Vice chair	1982–1992	
2	Nepal Dalit Sahitya tatha Sanskriti Pratisthan	Chair	1995	
3	Samaj Vikas Chhatravas, Kathmandu	Member	1999–2009	
4	Sunsari Sahitya Pratisthan, Dharan	Lifetime member	2000	
5	Cancer Relief Society, Dharan	Lifetime member	2003	
6	B.P. Koirala Institute of Health Sciences Cooperation Committee	Member	2004	
7	Asahaya Bal Anathalaya, Itahari	Lifetime member	2004–2005	
8	Pandit Chhabi Lal Pokharel Smriti Pratisthan	Member	2008–2010	
9	Rotary Club of Dharan	President; Member	2011–2012; 2012–present	
10	Dalit Nagarik Samaj	Organizer	2015–2016	
11	Nepal Utpidit Dalit Jatiya Mukti Samaj	Vice chair	Till 2006	
12	Nepal Rashtriya Dalit Mukti Morcha	Vice chair	Till 2011	

Sundas is the patron of Nepali Manch, Dalit Sandesh and Parishrami magazines, and the special advisor for Jana Utthan magazine. The advisor of Jagaran Media Center, Sundas worked as an advisor for Sathi until 2003 and Shabda Samyojan until 2007.

=== Activism ===
In memory of his late wife, Amina Sundas, Sundas established the Amina Scholarship Fund for the Dalit female students studying in Sharada Balika Namuna Secondary School, Dharan. The founder of Amina Sundas Dalit Scholarship Fund that provides scholarships to students of Purwanchal Campus, Sundas believes that education is the most effective tool to improve the quality of life. In 2007, Sundas worked as the deputy chair of the Dalit Development Committee of the then Ministry of Local Development. From 2009 to 2017, Sundas worked as the executive chairperson of Samata Foundation, an independent think tank specializing in the area of caste-based issues concerning Dalit communities of Nepal. From 2010 to 2014, he worked as the member of the national level council formed to promote equality and judicial reform within the Office of the Prime Minister and Council of Ministers. Sundas has visited several countries, including India, Bangladesh, Thailand, Switzerland, South Africa and the United States, to raise awareness on the issues of caste discrimination and untouchability in Nepal, and to promote equality and judicial reform.

=== Diplomatic service ===
Sundas was appointed as the Nepalese ambassador to the Kingdom of Bahrain by President Bidya Devi Bhandari on 28 June 2017 on the recommendation of Council of Ministers. According to a press statement published by the President's Office, the head of state made the decision in accordance with Article 282.1 of the Constitution of Nepal. Sundas returned to Nepal following the end of his tenure on 19 August 2021.

== Works ==
- Choriyeka Raat (Short story collection, 1969)
- Bhojpur ko Chinari (1969)
- Padam Sundas ka Purana Katha tatha Kavita (to be published)
- Parampara, Purpuro ra Punki: Dalit Jatiya Sangharsha ko Vivechana (to be published)
- Farkera Herda; Jeevan ka Aafna Anubhavharu (to be published)

== Awards and honours ==
- Bhagat Sarbajit Manab Maryada Rastriya Puraskar (2016)
- Certificate of appreciation from the Utpidit, Upekshit tatha Dalit Varga Utthan Vikas Samiti (2009)
- Public felicitation from Buddha Bihar, Dharan (2001)
- Jana Utthan Rashtriya Puraskar (2000)
- Certificate of appreciation from the Bharatiya Dalit Sahitya Academy (1997)
- Engineering School Sanskritik Padak (1962)
