= Mid-West University =

Public university in Birendranagar, Nepal

- मध्यपश्चिम विश्वबिद्यालय
- Other name: MU
- Former name: Birendranagar Multiple Campus
- Type: Public university
- Established: June 17, 2010 (16 years ago)
- Budget: Rs. 1.367 billion (USD $9.1 million) (2025–26)
- Chancellor: Prime Minister of Nepal
- Vice-Chancellor: Dr. Rajan Suwal
- Academic staff: 575 (~375 teaching staff 200 administrative and support personnel)
- Students: 15,000+
- Location: Birendranagar, Karnali, Nepal; 28.5896°N 81.6232°E
- Colours
- Mascots: book, pen and light
- Website: www.mwu.edu.np

Mid-West University (MU; Nepali: मध्यपश्चिम विश्वविद्यालय) is a public university located in Birendranagar, Surkhet, the headquarters of the Karnali Province of Nepal, formerly the headquarters of the Mid western development region of Nepal.

It is an autonomous and public higher education institution.

== History ==
The parliamentary act, established by the Nepalese government on June 17, 2010, based on the concept of a multi-university system, is a state-backed institution based on land donated by the Nepalese government. The campus of the university and Central Executive Office is located in Birendranagar, in the Surkhet district of Nepal.

== Faculties ==
=== Faculty of Engineering ===
==== Undergraduate Programs ====
- Bachelor Degree in Civil Engineering
- Bachelor Degree in Computer Engineering
- Bachelor Degree in Hydropower Engineering

==== Graduate Programs ====
- Master of Science in Structural Engineering
- Master of Science in Construction Management

=== Faculty of Management ===
==== Undergraduate Programs ====
- Bachelor in Business Studies
- Bachelor in Business Administration
- Bachelor in Hotel Management
- Bachelor in Travel and Tourism Management

==== Graduate Programs ====
- Master in Business Studies
- Master in Business Administration

==== Postgraduate Programs ====
- Mphil/PhD in Management

=== Faculty of Science and Technology ===
==== Undergraduate Programs ====
- Bachelor in Information technology
- Bachelor of Science in Computer Science and Information technology
- Bachelor of science in Biology
- Bachelor of science in Chemistry
- Bachelor of science in Physics
- Bachelor of science in Mathematics
- Bachelor of Science in statistics
- Bachelor of science in Environmental science

==== Graduate Programs ====
- Master of Science in Physics

=== Faculty of Law ===
==== Undergraduate Programs ====
- Bachelor of Arts, Bachelor of Legislative Law

=== Faculty of Agriculture and Forestry ===
==== Undergraduate Programs ====
- Bachelor of science in Agriculture

=== Faculty of Humanities and Social Sciences ===
==== Undergraduate Programs ====
- Bachelor of Art in social work
- Bachelor of Art in Rural development
- Bachelor of Art in sociology
- Bachelor of Art in English
- Bachelor of Art in Nepali
- Bachelor of Art in Mathematics
- Bachelor of Art in development economics
- Bachelor of Art in international and diplomatic relations
- Bachelor of in journalism and mass communication

==== Graduate Programs ====
- Master of Art in Social work
- Master of Art in Rural development
- Master of Art in Sociology
- Master of Art in English
- Master of Art in Nepali
- Master of Art in Mathematics
- Master of Art in development economics
- Master of Art in international and diplomatic relations
- Master of Art in Anthropology
- Master of Art in conflict and peace studies
- Master of Art in journalism and mass communication
- Master of Art in folklore and cultural studies
- Master of Art in international cooperation and development

=== Faculty of Education ===
==== Undergraduate Programs ====
- Bachelor of Education in English
- Bachelor of Education in Nepali
- Bachelor of Education in Mathematics
- Bachelor of Education in Education science
- Bachelor of Education in Population
- Bachelor of Education in Health Education Promotion
- Bachelor of Education in Education planning and Management

==== Graduate Programs ====
- Master of Education in English
- Master of Education in Nepali
- Master of Education Mathematics
- Master of Education in Education science
- Master of Education in Population
- Master of Education in Health Education Promotion
- Master of Education in curriculum and Evaluation
- Master of Education in Education planning and Management

== Central schools ==
=== Karnali Province ===
- Graduate school of Humanities and Social Sciences, Surkhet
- Graduate school of Education, Surkhet
- Graduate school of Management, Surkhet
- Graduate school of Science and Technology, Surkhet
- Graduate school of Engineering, Surkhet
- Graduate school of Law, Surkhet
- Graduate school of Agriculture and Forestry, Surkhet

== Autonomous school ==
=== Karnali Province ===
- Mid west university school of Management(MUSOM), Surkhet

== Constituent Campuses ==
=== Lumbini Province ===
- Bageshwari Multiple Campus, Kohalpur Banke
- Babai Multiple Campus, Gulariya, Bardiya
- Jaljala Multiple Campus, Rolpa

=== Karnali Province ===
- Narayan Multiple Campus, Dailekh
- Tila Karnali Multiple Campus, Kalikot
- Rara Multiple Campus, Mugu
- Musikot Khalanga Multiple Campus, West Rukum
- Bheri Gyanodaya Multiple Campus, Jajarkot
- Bheri Multiple Campus, Gumi, Surkhet
- Vidhyapur Janata Multiple Campus, Surkhet

== Affiliated colleges ==
=== Bagmati Province ===
- Global College International (GCI), Mid Baneshwor -Kathmandu

== See also ==
- Kathmandu University
- Pokhara University
- Purbanchal University
- Tribhuvan University
