= Sabita Maharjan =

Computer scientist

Sabita Maharjan (born 1980) is a computer scientist, a professor of networks and distributed systems in the Department of Informatics at the University of Oslo, Norway. Her research involves wireless networks, network security, green computing, and vehicular ad hoc networks. Originally from Nepal, she was educated in Nepal, Japan, and Norway, and has worked in Nepal, Singapore and Norway.

== Early life and education ==
Maharjan was born in 1980 in Kathmandu, where her parents operated a roadside vegetable stand. She became a student at St. Xavier's College, Maitighar and then the Pulchowk Campus of Tribhuvan University, where she completed a bachelor's degree in 2004. Next, she obtained a scholarship from the Japanese government to study at the Tokyo Institute of Technology, where she earned a master's degree in 2008. She moved to Norway and the University of Oslo in 2009, and completed a Ph.D. there in 2013.

== Career and later life ==
Maharjan taught at Tribhuvan University from 2004 to 2006, and worked for the Institute for Infocomm Research in Singapore in 2010. After completing her Ph.D., she became a research scientist at the Simula Metropolitan Center for Digital Engineering, while continuing to hold a part-time position at the University of Oslo as an associate professor. She since became a full professor at the University of Oslo, while continuing to hold an adjunct affiliation with Simula as a senior research scientist.

Beyond her academic work, Maharjan has also held a leadership role as women's coordinator for the Non-Resident Nepali Association of Norway.

== Recognition ==
Maharjan was one of two 2020 recipients of the TCGCC Outstanding Young Researcher Award of the Green Communications & Computing Technical Committee of the IEEE Communications Society.
