= Khwopa Engineering College (PU) =

College affiliated with Purbanchal University

- ख्वप इन्जिनियरिङ् कलेज
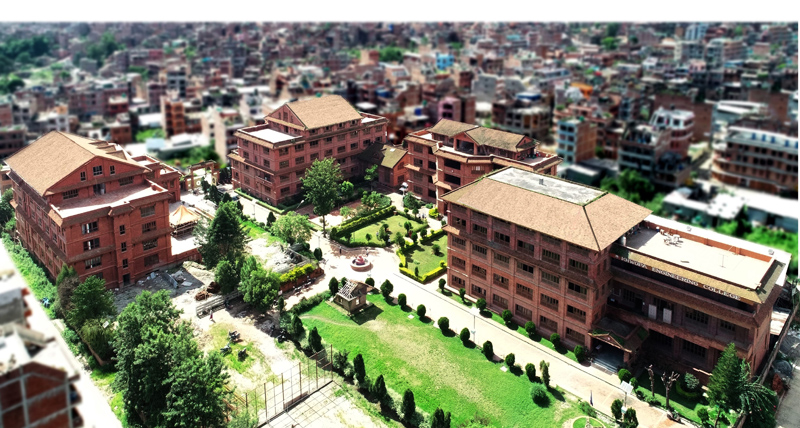
- Type: Community/Non-profit
- Established: 2001 (AD)
- Affiliations: Purbanchal University
- Chairman: Sunil Prajapati
- Principal: Sujan Maka
- Location: Libali 8, Bhaktapur, Nepal; 27°40′15.7″N 85°26′21.3″E
- Website: www.khec.edu.np

Khwopa Engineering College (KhEC) is a community based engineering college situated in the culturally rich city of Bhaktapur, Nepal. It is named after, Khwopa the pre historic name of Bhaktapur. Khwopa Engineering College is affiliated to Purbanchal University.

It was established as a community college to provide engineering education by the local government with a motto "Dedicated to country and people". It is Nepal 's first community-based engineering colleges and is undertaken by Bhaktapur Municipality.

== Programs ==
Khwopa engineering college has various engineering programs at bachelor and masters level.

=== Bachelor programs ===
- Architecture
- Civil Engineering
- Computer Engineering
- Electronics and Communication Engineering

=== Masters programs ===
- Masters in Earthquake Engineering
- Masters in Urban Design and Conservation

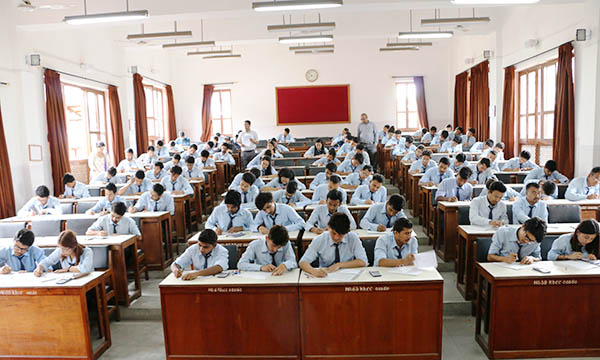

== Conference and research programs ==
On 25–28 April 2016, the college organised International Conference on Earthquake Engineering and Post-disaster Reconstruction Planning (ICEE-PDRP) to mark the April 2015 Nepal earthquake and has successfully organised the second ICEE-PDRP in 2019 April. in Bhaktapur. The college publishes a peer-reviewed journal Journal of Science of Engineering to serve the interests of professionals, academics and research organisations working in the field of science and engineering.

== See also ==
- List of engineering colleges in Nepal
- Purbanchal University School of Engineering
- Khwopa College of Engineering
