= Geomatics Institute of Technology =

Campus affiliated with Tribhuvan University

Geomatic Institute of Technology
- जियोमेटिक इन्स्टिच्युट अफ टेक्नोलोजी
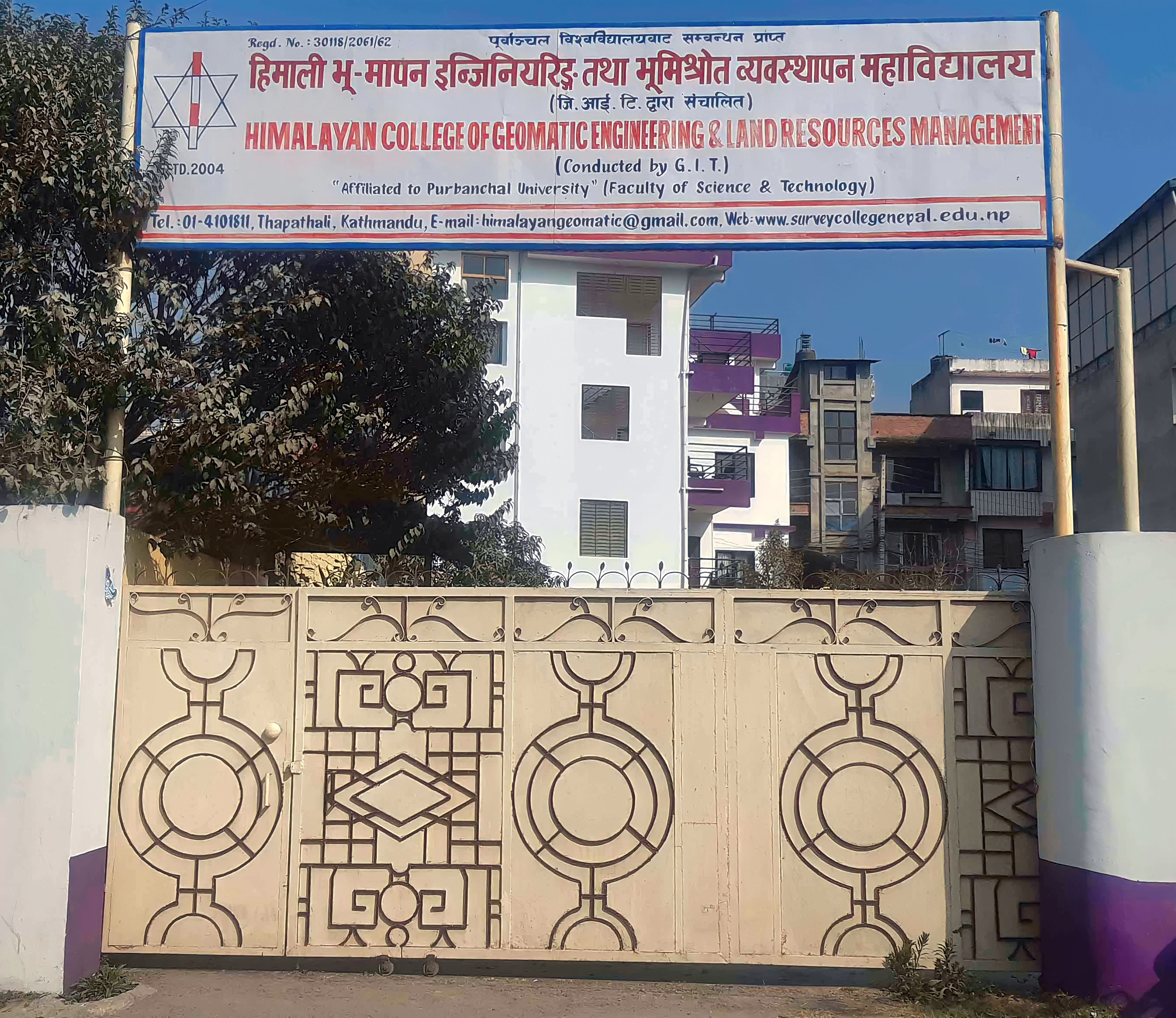
- Other names: Himalayan College of Geomatic Engineering and Land Management
- Type: Private
- Established: 2004 (AD)
- Affiliations: Purbanchal University
- Chairman: Rajesh Mahato
- Principal: Punya Prasad Oli
- Location: Thapathali 11, Kathmandu, Nepal
- Website: www.surveycollegenepal.edu.np geonity.vercel.app

Geomatic Institute of Technology (Nepali: जियोमेटिक इंस्टीटयूट अफ टेक्नोलोजी) is a private engineering college in Nepal, established in 2004 with the aim of teaching engineering skills and knowledge related to surveying and land management. It is the first and only dedicated college in Nepal for geomatics engineering studies. GIT is an alternative to Paschimanchal Campus of Tribhuvan University.

The Himalayan College of Geomatics Engineering and Land Management is affiliated to Purbanchal University.

== Selection criteria ==
The following are the criteria for admission to the Bachelor in Geomatics Engineering course at Geomatics Institute of Technology:

- Applicants should have passed +2 or ISc or Diploma in Surveying or any other engineering field.
- Applicants should have passed entrance exam taken by University.

== Scholarship ==
Scholarships are provided to 10% of students in each class depending on various criteria set by the institute. Due to a lack of admissions and hectic course in PU around half of the seats remain vacant in each batch at GIT.

== Courses offered ==
Geomatics Institute of Technology provides a four-year bachelor's course in Geomatics Engineering and has affiliation for 40 seats per year. The Bachelor of Engineering in Geomatic Engineering at Purbanchal University is a comprehensive four-year program divided into eight semesters. Currently 48 seats are offered for each batch.

== See also ==
- Survey Department
- Thapathali Campus
- Pashchimanchal Campus
- Department of Geomatics Engineering, Kathmandu University(KU)
