= Institute of Agriculture and Animal Science =

Nepali autonomous academic institute

- कृषि र पशु विज्ञान अध्ययन संस्थान
- Former names: School of Agriculture (1957), College of Agriculture (1968)
- Type: Public
- Established: 1957 (as School of Agriculture); 1972 (as IAAS under TU)
- Parent institution: Tribhuvan University
- Dean: Dr. Kishor Chandra Dahal
- Location: Kirtipur, Kathmandu (Dean's Office); Rampur, Chitwan (Original central campus), Nepal; 27.680003747419757°N 85.29261771350761°E
- Website: iaas.tu.edu.np

The Institute of Agriculture and Animal Science (IAAS, Nepali: कृषि र पशु विज्ञान अध्ययन संस्थान) is an autonomous academic institute under Tribhuvan University (TU), Nepal's largest academic institution. It is Nepal's first higher education institution in the field of agriculture and one of the five technical institutes under TU, specializing in agriculture, animal sciences, and veterinary sciences.

IAAS operates undergraduate, postgraduate and Ph.D. programs in agriculture and livestock streams. The institute has four constituent campuses and multiple affiliated colleges across Nepal.

== History ==
=== Early Development (1957-1972) ===
IAAS was originally established as the "School of Agriculture" under the Ministry of Agriculture in 1957 to train Junior Technical Assistants (JTAs) in agriculture. The institution underwent significant transformations during its formative years:

- 1957: Established as School of Agriculture under the Ministry of Agriculture
- 1968: Upgraded to "College of Agriculture" and introduced a two-year Intermediate of Agricultural Science (I.Sc.Ag.) program
- 1972: Granted status as the Institute of Agriculture and Animal Science under Tribhuvan University, introducing bachelor's degree programs in agriculture

Initially, the institution operated at Jagdamba Bhawan in Pulchowk, Kathmandu, without its own dedicated facilities.

=== Campus Development and Expansion ===
In 1974, the institute relocated from Kathmandu to its main campus in Rampur, Chitwan. The expansion continued with the establishment of branch campuses:

- 1975: Branch campus established at Sundarbazar, Lamjung
- 1978: Branch campus established at Paklihawa, Rupandehi

Additional campuses were later established to serve different regions of Nepal.

=== Modern Challenges (2011-2020) ===
The period from 2011 to 2020 presented significant challenges for IAAS, primarily due to the upgrading of the central campus at Rampur into the Agriculture and Forestry University (AFU). During this transition:

- The Dean's Office was relocated to rented premises in Kathmandu in 2012
- Student admissions faced difficulties

Since 2014/15, most IAAS programs have resumed normal operations, with the Dean's Office now permanently established in Kathmandu. Postgraduate programs (MSc and PhD) are conducted from IAAS's dedicated building at TU, Kirtipur.

== Structure ==
=== Constituent Campuses ===
IAAS operates through four constituent campuses:

- Rampur Agriculture Campus, Khairahani, Chitwan - The original central campus
- Lamjung Agriculture Campus, Sundarbazar, Lamjung
- Paklihawa Agriculture Campus, Paklihawa, Rupandehi
- Gauradaha Agriculture Campus, Gauradaha, Jhapa

=== Affiliated Colleges ===
IAAS has several affiliated colleges across Nepal:

- Agriculture and Animal Science Community Campus, Gokuleshwor, Baitadi
- College of Live Sciences, Tulsipur, Dang
- Prithu Technical College, Lamahi, Dang
- B.Sc Horticulture, Mahendra Ratna Multiple Campus, Ilam

== Academic Programs ==
=== Undergraduate Programs ===
IAAS offers three undergraduate degree programs:

- Bachelor of Science in Agriculture (BSc Ag)
- Bachelor of Science in Horticulture (BSc Hort)
- Bachelor of Veterinary Science and Animal Husbandry (BVSc&AH)

=== Postgraduate Programs ===
Four master's degree programs are offered:

- Master of Science in Agriculture (MScAg)
- Master of Science in Aquaculture (MScAqua)
- Master of Science in Animal Science (MScAnSc)
- Master of Veterinary Science (MVSc)

=== Doctoral Programs ===
IAAS offers PhD programs in:

- Agricultural Sciences
- Animal Sciences

== Mission and Objectives ==
The institute's mission focuses on promoting agricultural science and training manpower for agricultural development through teaching, research, and extension services. Primary objectives include:

- Designing and implementing educational programs balancing established and emerging agricultural sector needs
- Introducing innovative teaching, research, and technology dissemination methods
- Promoting research and studies addressing farmers' needs in Nepal
- Developing competent human resources for the agricultural sector

== Current Status and Challenges ==
IAAS was the sole higher education institution in agriculture in Nepal until 2000. The educational landscape has significantly expanded, with over 50 institutions now offering agricultural education. Despite this growth, student enrollment has been declining, with more than 50% of allocated seats for B.Sc. Agriculture programs remaining vacant nationally as of 2023. While IAAS's constituent campuses maintain full enrollment, affiliated colleges have experienced partial occupancy challenges.

== See also ==
- Institute of Forestry
- Agriculture and Forestry University
- Tribhuvan University
- Higher education in Nepal
- Agriculture in Nepal
- B.Sc Horticulture in Nepal
