= College of Information Technology and Engineering =

Private college in Kathmandu, Nepal

- CITE
- Motto: Engage • Learn • Innovate • Succeed • Connect
- Type: Private
- Established: 2000
- Affiliations: Purbanchal University
- Principal: Er. Sudhir Guragain
- Location: Subidhanagar, Tinkune, Kathmandu, Nepal
- Campus: Urban
- Website: www.cit.edu.np

College of Information Technology and Engineering (CITE) is a private higher education institution located in Subidhanagar, Tinkune, Kathmandu, Nepal. Established in 2000, the college is affiliated with Purbanchal University and offers undergraduate and postgraduate programs in engineering, information technology, and management.

The college was established to provide higher education in engineering, information technology and business administration. It is affiliated with Purbanchal University.

== History ==
The College of Information Technology and Engineering was established in 2000 in Kathmandu. Since its establishment, it has expanded its academic offerings in engineering, information technology and management under the affiliation of Purbanchal University.

== Campus ==
The college is situated in Subidhanagar, Tinkune, Kathmandu. It provides classrooms,and sports facilities for students.

== Academic programs ==
=== Bachelor's programs ===
- Bachelor of Computer Engineering (BCE)

=== Master's programs ===
- Master of Information Technology (MIT)

== Admission ==
Admission to all academic programs is based on the eligibility criteria prescribed by Purbanchal University. Applicants are generally required to pass the university's entrance examination and meet the minimum academic qualifications for their respective programs.

=== Engineering ===
Applicants seeking admission to the Bachelor of Computer Engineering (BCE) program must have completed Higher Secondary Education (+2), Intermediate of Science (I.Sc.), or an equivalent qualification in the science stream recognized by Purbanchal University with a minimum of 45% marks. Students from the Biology group are also eligible to apply. Candidates are required to qualify in the university's entrance examination.

=== Information Technology ===
For the Bachelor of Information Technology (BIT) program, applicants must have completed +2 or an equivalent qualification from any recognized institution with at least 45% marks. A mathematics subject of at least 100 marks at the higher secondary level is mandatory. Students from Science, Management, Education and Humanities streams are eligible provided they meet the mathematics requirement.

For the Bachelor of Computer Application (BCA) program, applicants must have completed +2 or an equivalent qualification with a minimum of 45% marks from any recognized institution. Students from Science, Management, Education and Humanities streams are eligible to apply.

=== Management ===
Applicants for the Bachelor of Business Administration (BBA) program must have completed +2 or an equivalent qualification recognized by Purbanchal University with at least a second division or equivalent academic performance. Admission is subject to the university's entrance requirements.
