= Ramswarup Ramsagar Multiple Campus =

- रामस्वरुप रामसागर बहुमुखी क्याम्पस
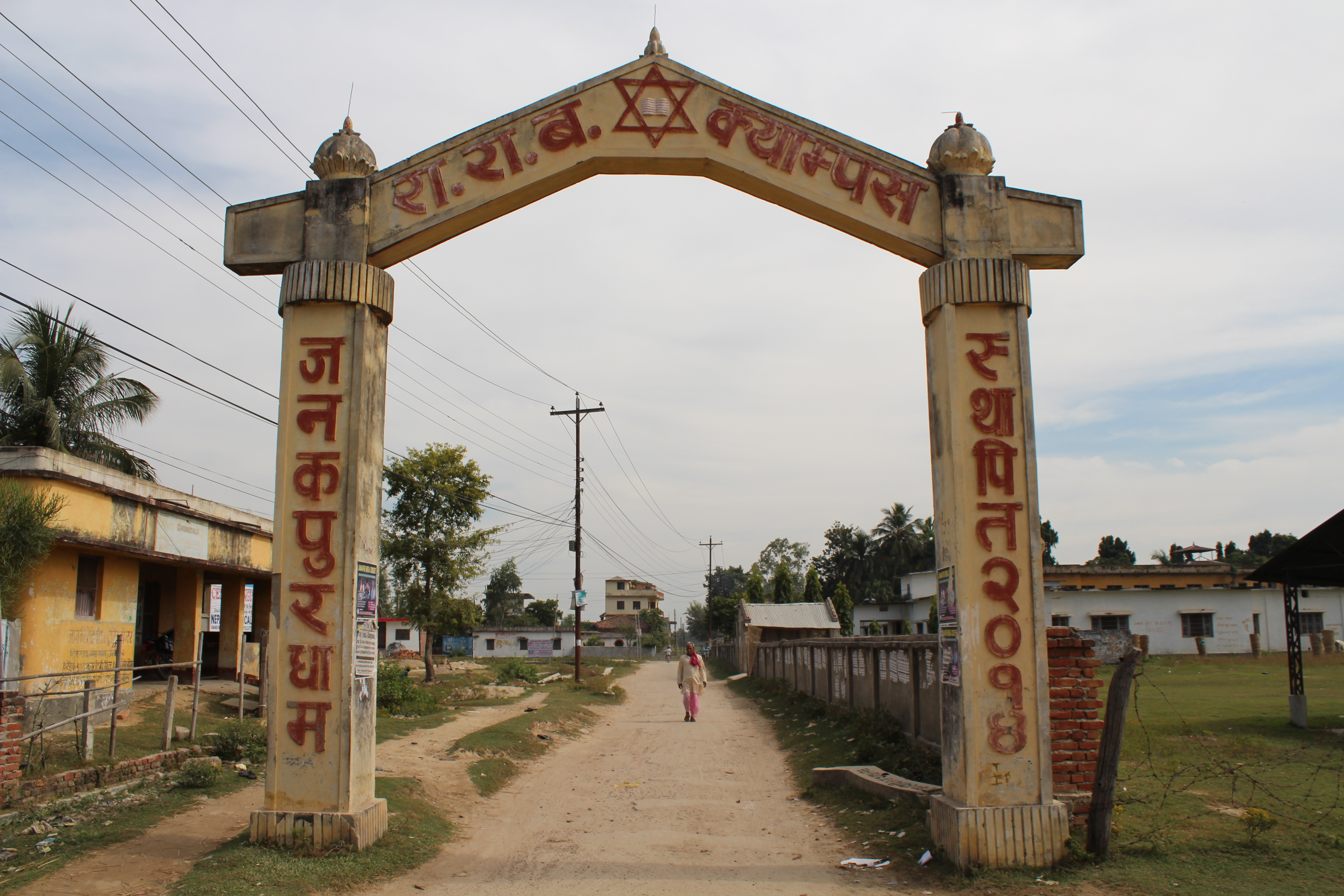
- RRM Campus entrance
- Type: Public Coeducational
- Established: 1957 A.D. (2014 B.S.)
- Founders: Samswaroop Sah; Ram Sagar Sah
- Parent institution: Tribhuvan University
- Affiliations: TU
- Campus Chief: Pradeep Kumar Prasad
- Academic staff: 152
- Students: 18,203
- Location: Janakpur 12, Janakpur, Madhesh Province, Nepal
- Campus: 1,039 acres (420 ha)
- Language: Nepali and English
- FSU chairman: Manish Yadav (NSU)
- Colors
- Website: rrmc.tu.edu.np

Ramswarup Ramsagar Multiple Campus (Nepali: रामस्वरूप रामसागर बहुमुखी क्याम्पस जनकपुर) is one of the 62 constituent campuses of Tribhuvan University. The campus was established in 1957 (2014 BS) and is one of the oldest constituent campuses of Tribhuvan University (Nepal). It is one of the oldest educational institutions of Nepal and has helped establish Janakpur as a centre of education.

This campus offers Bachelor and Master level courses in Humanities, Management, Science and Education. The campus has some 7,215 students in total and is one of the campuses with the highest number of students.

== History ==
=== Establishment ===
Established in 1957 (2014 BS), the campus is even older than the oldest university of Nepal, Tribhuvan University. The university was named after Ramswaroop Sah and Ram Sagar Sah who donated 1039 acres of land for its establishment. The campus, which spreads over an area of 420.46 hectares, is even larger than Tribhuvan University in terms of area. The campus even ran Intermediate programs, but these were discontinued after TU stopped offering them.

RRM campus marked its golden jubilee in 2007.

== Free Student's Union ==
The college has a Free Student Union as the umbrella organization of students established to speak students voice and work on their behalf. The campus FSU is won by Nepal Student Union and is led by Manish Yadav as chairman.

=== Officials ===
- Chairman-Manish Kumar Yadav (NSU)
- Vice chairman-Rajesh Kumar Karn (NSU)
- Secretary-Karan Sah (DSU)
- Treasurer- Rakesh Kumar Singh (NSU)
- Joint secretary-Umesh Kumar Mandal (NSU)

== Notable alumni ==
- Ram Baran Yadav, first president of Nepal
- Bimalendra Nidhi, sitting MP and former Deputy Prime Minister of Nepal and Home minister
- Mahantha Thakur, former minister of Nepal and sitting MP
- Ram Krishna Yadav, former agriculture minister of Nepal
- Ram Saroj Yadav, sitting MLA and Deputy CM of Madhesh Province
- Mahendra Yadav, former MP and minister of Nepal

== See also ==
- Rajarshi Janak University
- Gaushala Engineering Campus
