= Khwopa College of Engineering (TU) =

College affiliated with Tribhuvan University

- ख्वप कलेज अफ इन्जिनियरिङ्
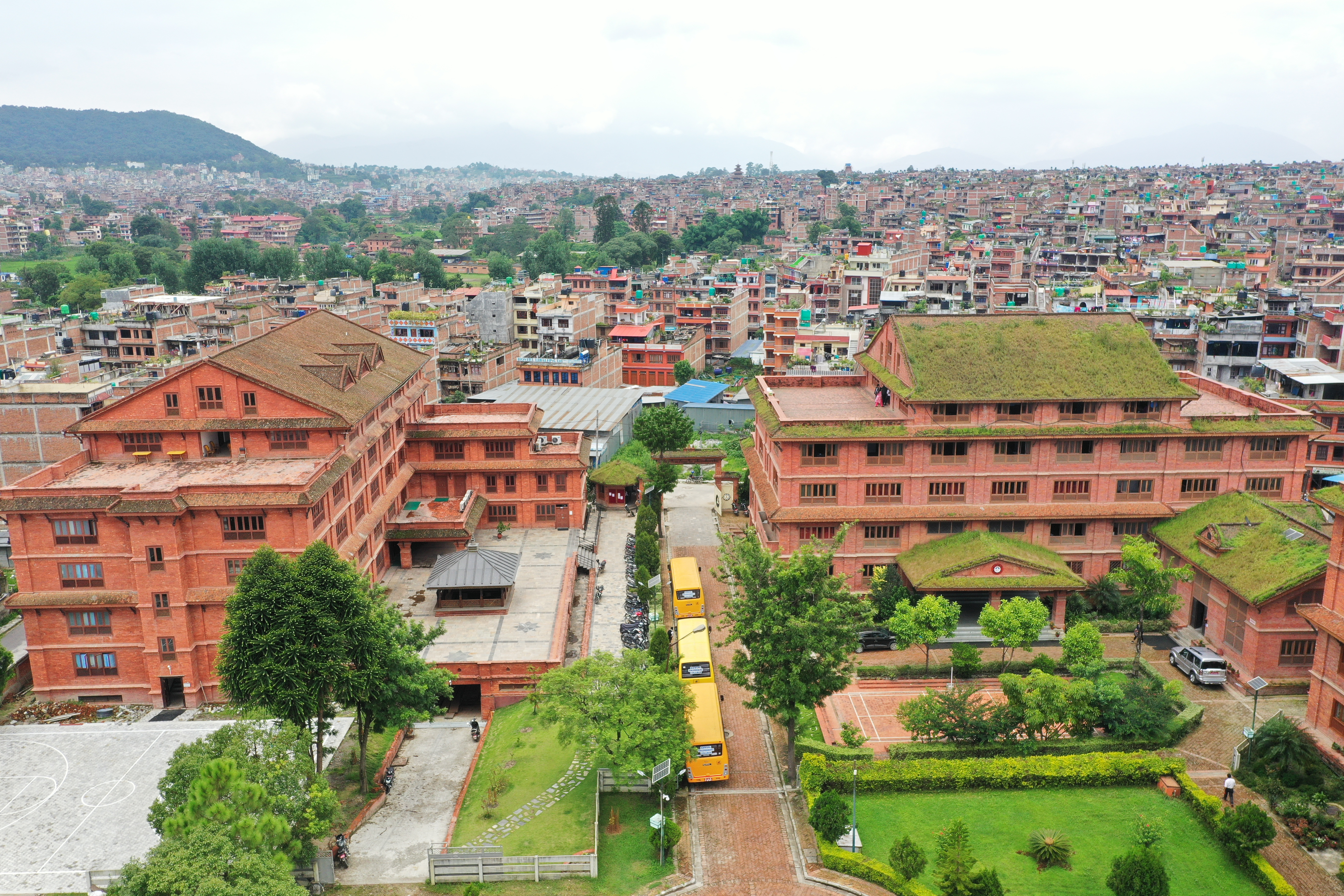
- Type: Community/Non-profit
- Established: 2008 (AD)
- Affiliations: Tribhuwan University
- Chairman: Sunil Prajapati
- Principal: Sunil Duwal
- Location: Libali 8, Bhaktapur, Nepal; 27°40′15.7″N 85°26′21.3″E
- Website: www.khwopa.edu.np

Khwopa College of Engineering (Nepali: ख्वप कलेज अफ इन्जिनियरिङ्) is a community-based engineering college established in 2008 by people of Bhaktapur with aim to provide quality education to general people with affordable fee. It has been undertaken by Bhaktapur Municipality, a local government of Nepal, since its establishment.

Khwopa College of Engineering is affiliated to Tribhuvan University.

== Location ==
Khwopa College of Engineering is located in prehistoric city of Bhaktapur.

== Admission criteria ==
Students who have passed an entrance exam conducted by IOE are allowed to apply for admission. Students are admitted by priority selection according to their score in IOE entrance exam.

== Conference and research programs ==
On 25–28 April 2016, the college organized International Conference on Earthquake Engineering and Post-disaster Reconstruction Planning (ICEE-PDRP) to mark the April 2015 Nepal earthquake and has successfully organized the second ICEE-PDRP in 2019 April in Bhaktapur. The college publishes a peer-reviewed journal Journal of Science of Engineering to serve the interests of professionals, academics and research organizations working in the field of science and engineering.

== Courses ==
KhCE offers several bachelor programs under affiliation with [Tribhuvan University].

- [Bachelor in Civil Engineering]
- Bachelor in Computer Engineering
- Bachelor in Electrical Engineering

== See also ==
- List of engineering colleges in Nepal
- Khwopa Engineering College
