= Puranchaur =

Puranchaur पुरन्चौर
- Town in Pokhara
- Location in Nepal Puranchaur (Nepal)
- Coordinates: 28.32°N 83.99°E
- Country: Nepal
- Province: Gandaki Province
- District: Kaski District

Population (2011)
  - Total: 3,597
- Time zone: UTC+5:45 (Nepal Time)
- Postal code: 33713
- Area code: 061

Puranchaur (Nepali: पुरन्चाैर) is a former Village Development Committee in Kaski District in the Gandaki Province of northern-central Nepal. It is now annexed to Pokhara metropolitan city, and is ward no. 19 of it. At the 2011 Nepal census, it had a population of 3,597 persons in 865 individual households.

Natural Resource Management College, which is an educational institution focused on agriculture, was established here in 2015.

This college is affiliated with Agriculture and Forestry University, and is the first affiliated college of the university.

== Location ==
Puranchaur is situated to the north of Lamachaur and Hemja, both of which are also the wards of Pokhara. Seti Gandaki river, to its south, separates Puranchaur from Hemja. Its air distance from Phewa Lake is around 6.5 milometers (4 miles).

== Geography ==
Situated in Hilly region, Puranchaur has small hills and slopes. The land is considerably fertile where people grow crops like wheat, paddy, maize, millet, potato, mustard etc. Different vegetables like cabbage, cauliflower, pumpkin, sponge gourd etc. and fruits like orange, lemon, banana, guava, strawberries, litchi, pears, plum etc. are also grown.

== Transportation ==
Transportation is gradually developing in Puranchaur. Gravelled roads and earthen roads are constructed in many parts while black-pitched roads are also constructed in some parts. There is black-pitched road from chitepani to raikar. The road to Gandaki Rainbow Trout Farm of Sardikhola, from Pokhara passes through Puranchaur.

== Culture and Ethnicity ==
Majority of the residents here are Hindus. The major ethnic groups are Chhetri, Brahmin, Sarki and Kami. Gurungs and Magars also reside here notably in fewer number. People celebrate festivals such as Dashain, Tihar, Teej, Jaai purnima, Holi etc.

== Development ==
Development works are gradually accelerating, mostly after the establishment of AFU-affiliated college, College of Natural Resource Management. Students from many parts of the country are staying in rent in many of the households, which has encouraged the expansion of services in the area. As it is nearer to the town, the positive effects on development and construction are seen.
