= Thapathali Campus =

Constituent campus of Tribhuvan University

- थापाथली क्याम्पस
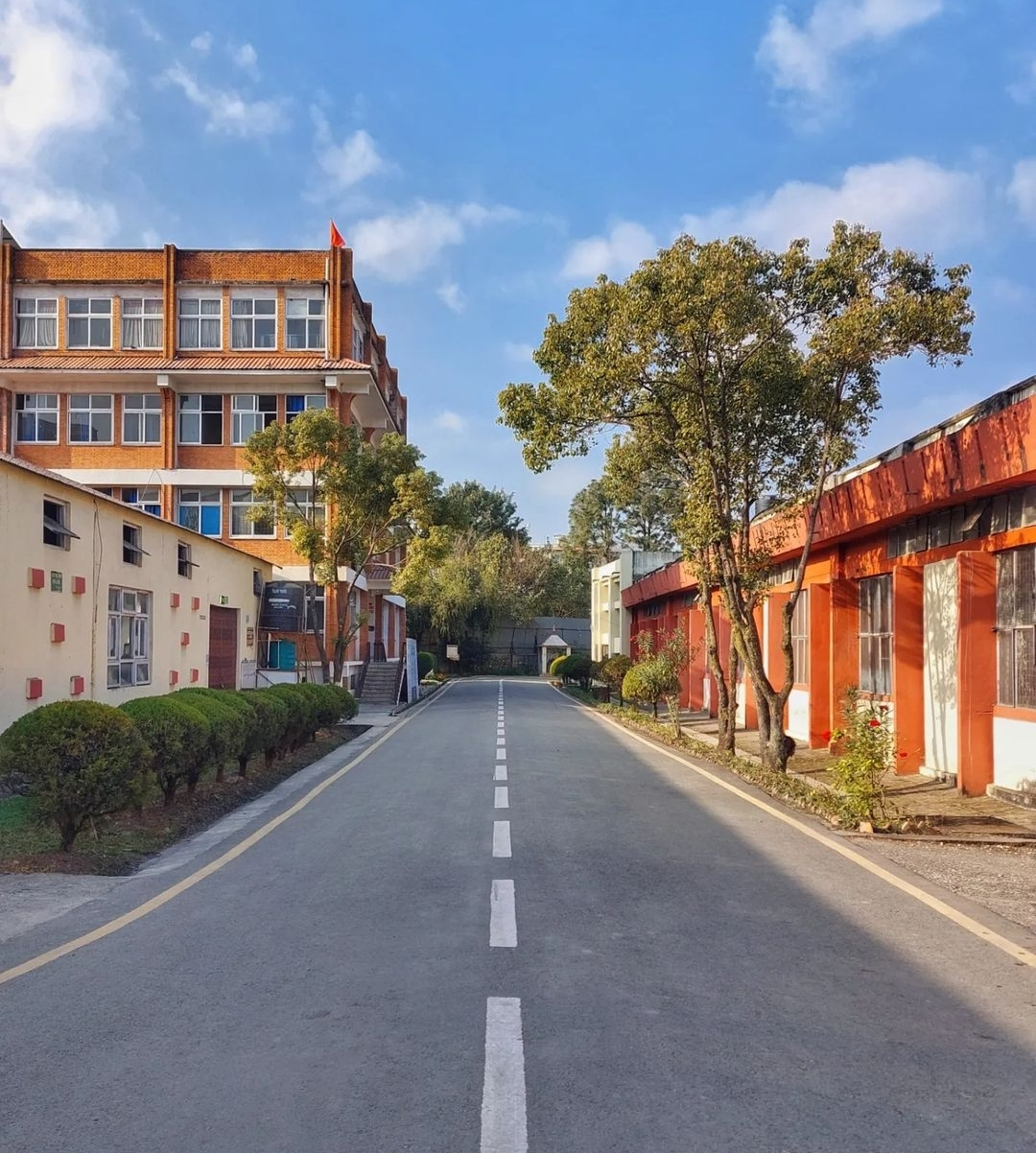
- IOE, Thapathali Campus
- Former names: Technical; Training Institute (TTI) [2021-2029 B.S.]
- Motto: Providing quality education in the field of engineering for enhancement of human resources to develop the nation.
- Type: Public Coeducational
- Established: 1966; 60 years ago
- Parent institution: Institute of Engineering, Tribhuvan University
- Affiliations: Institute of Engineering, TU
- Campus Chief: Khem Gyanwali
- Students: 2000+
- Location: Thapathali, Kathmandu, Bagmati, Nepal; 27.6943°N 85.3188°E
- Language: Nepali and English
- Colors
- Website: www.tcioe.edu.np

Thapathali Campus (Nepali: थापाथली क्याम्पस) also known as Thapathali Engineering Campus is the first and one of the five constituent engineering campuses under Institute of Engineering of Tribhuvan University (TU). Located at the center of Kathmandu city, the campus was established in 2023 B.S. to develop middle level manpower in the field in different fields engineering which upgraded its programs to bachelor and master level along the course of time.

Being roughly about 1.25 km from the central campus Pulchowk Campus, it remains the second most demanded engineering campus in Nepal after Pulchowk Campus. It is a governmental college and funded by the Government of Nepal. Students who have passed an entrance exam conducted by IOE are allowed to apply for admission. Students are admitted by priority selection according to their score in IOE entrance exam. As of the year 2078, the campus took only 432 students from about 15,000 candidates which roughly estimates the acceptance rate to be 2.88%. Similarly, total Intake in Master Level is 60 students per year.

== Location ==
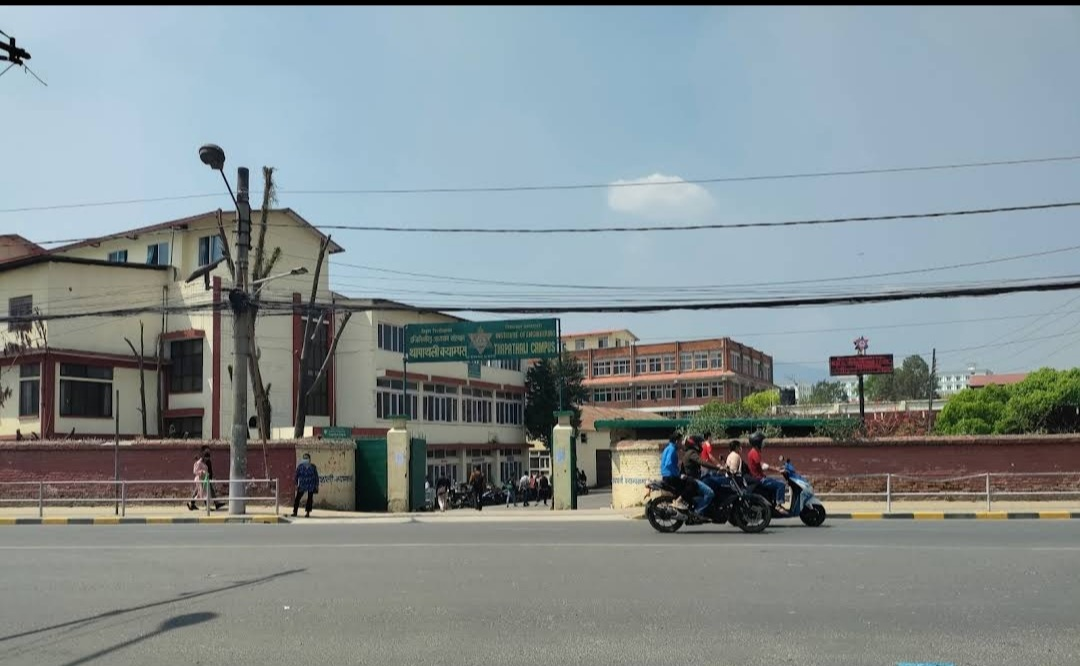

Thapathali Campus is in Thapathali, just beside the army headquarter at the heart of Kathmandu city.

== History ==
In the presence of Late King Mahendra, Late Dr. Heinrich Lübke, President of Federal Republic of Germany inaugurated Technical Institute (TTI) on 29th of Falgun 2023 B.S. The Technical Training Institute(TTI) offered mid-level manpower course in mechanical engineering, automobile engineering, electrical engineering and mechanical drafting beginning. With the assistance from the Government of Federal republic of Germany, Technical Training Institute Project (TTIP) was established in Nepal in 2019 B.S., with the sole objective of producing trained trade persons and technicians needed for the development of the country. TTI started three years vocational training in mechanical, automobile and electrical trades for S.L.C. graduates from 2022 B.S. to 2024 B.S. At the meantime, the three years course in mechanical drafting was transferred to Pulchowk, IOE.

From 2029 B.S. this Technical Training Institute (TTI) was renamed as Thapathali Campus under Tribhuvan University (T.U.) and is known as Institute of Engineering, Thapathali Campus thereafter. Campus started diploma in mechanical engineering and diploma in automobile engineering since 2043 B.S. Later, diploma in electronics engineering and diploma computer engineering started from 2058 B.S.

According to the policy of Institute of Engineering (IOE), campus introduce Bachelor in Industrial engineering in 2062 B.S., Bachelor in Civil engineering in 2066 B.S., Bachelor in Electronics and Communication engineering in 2067 B.S., Bachelor in Mechanical engineering in 2068 B.S., by stopping new intakes in all the diploma courses from 2070 B. S. Recently, campus has started intake in Bachelor in Architecture and Master in Earthquake engineering since 2071 B.S., Bachelor in Automobile engineering since 2072 B.S. and Master in Mechanical design & Manufacturing since 2073 B.S.

== Courses offered ==
=== Bachelor level ===
Programs	Intake		
Programs	Regular	Full-fee	Total
Civil Engineering (BCE)	36	108	144
Computer Engineering (BCT)	12	36	48
Electronics, Communication & Information Engineering (BEI)	12	36	48
Mechanical Engineering (BME)	12	36	48
Bachelor of Architecture (BAR)	12	36	48
Automobile Engineering (BAME)	12	36	48
Industrial Engineering (BIE)	12	36	48
Total	108	324	432

=== Masters level ===
Programs	Department	Intake				
Programs	Department	Regular	IOE Reserved	Full fee	Sponsored	Total
Masters in Earthquake Engineering	Civil	5	1	6	8	20
Informatics and Intelligent Systems Engineering	Electronics and Computer engineering	5	1	6	8	20
Master in Mechanical System Design and Manufacturing	Mechanical and Automobile	5	1	6	8	20

== Student Clubs ==
- TENSOR
- Electronics and Computer Amidst Students of Thapathali (ECAST)
- Robotics and Automation center (RAC)
- IEEE, Thapathali Student Branch
- Automobile Mechanical Engineering Students Innovative Nexus (AMESIN)
- Architecture Student's Innovative Society (ASIS)
- Civil Engineering Students' Society (CESS)
- Thapathali Music and Arts Club
- Society of Industrial Engineering Students (SOIES)
- Nepal Terai Bidyarthi Sangh (NTBS)

== Journal of Innovation in Engineering Education ==
The Journal of Innovation in Engineering Education (ISSN 2594-343X) is an open access peer-reviewed scientific journal, trying to provide a national and international platform for important scientific discussion related to engineering and technology. It seeks to publish original research paper of scientific quality with aim to provide archival resources for researchers from all engineering backgrounds. The journal considers articles in the form of research article, review article and short commentary. It is published annually from Institute of Engineering, Thapathali Campus. This journal accepts research articles from all engineering fields.

== See also ==
- Pulchowk Campus
- Pashchimanchal Campus
- Purwanchal Campus
- Gaushala Engineering Campus
- Geomatic Institute of Technology
