= Institute of Forestry =

Educational institution in Nepal

Coordinates: 28.187816°N 83.991492°E

- वन विज्ञान अध्ययन संस्थान
- Type: Public
- Established: 1947
- Parent institution: Tribhuvan University
- Dean: Bir Bahadur Khanal Chhetri
- Location: Kirtipur, Kathmandu; Pokhara; Hetauda, Nepal
- Website: www.iof.edu.np

The Institute of Forestry (IoF, Nepali: वन विज्ञान अध्ययन संस्थान) is one of the five technical institutes under Tribhuvan University, Nepal's largest academic institution.

IOF runs undergraduate, postgraduate and Ph.D. programs. it previously ran Diploma courses till 2012. The institute has three constituent and one affiliated campuses in the country. Its three constituent campus namely School of Forestry and Natural Resource Management, Pokhara Campus and Hetauda Campus.

== History ==
=== Formation ===
Under the Department of Forests, the IoF was founded as Nepal Forestry Institute in 1947 in Singha Durbar. However, it was relocated to Bhimphedi in 1957, then to Hetauda in 1965 before being incorporated into TU from 1972. The current head office of the institute, usually referred to as the dean's office, is housed at Kirtipur, Balkhu.

The IoF implements forestry-related academic programs through its two constituent campuses, located in Pokhara and Hetauda. The current dean of the institute is Bir Bahadur Khanal Chhetri, and he is backed by two assistant deans, presently Dr.Thakur Silwal and Sony Baral.

== Constituent campuses ==
- Pokhara Campus
- Hetauda Campus
- School of Forestry and Natural Resource Management, Kirtipur

== Affiliated colleges ==
- Kathmandu Forestry College, Kahmandu

== Courses ==
=== Bachelor ===
Bachelor programs
Bachelor in Forestry (BSc. Forestry)	Campus	Intake		
Bachelor in Forestry (BSc. Forestry)	Campus	Low tuition fee	High tuition fee	Total
Bachelor in Forestry (BSc. Forestry)	Pokhara Campus	36	44	80
Bachelor in Forestry (BSc. Forestry)	Hetauda Campus	27	53	80

=== Masters ===
Masters programs
Course	Pokhara Campus			Hetauda Campus			School of Forestry and Natural Resource Management		
Course	Intake			Intake			Intake		
Course	Low tuition fee	High tuition fee	Total	Low tuition fee	High tuition fee	Total	Low tuition fee	High tuition fee	Total
Forestry	10	15	25	10	15	25	10	15	25
Watershed Management	8	7	15						
Wildlife Management and Biodiversity Conservation				8	7	15			
Mountain Environment and Development Studies							8	7	15
Natural Resource Management and Rural Development	8	7	15						
Community Forestry	8	7	15						
Total seats									

== See also ==
The other technical institutes at TU are:

- Institute of Agriculture and Animal Science
- Institute of Engineering
- Institute of Medicine
