= Manmohan Technical University =

Public university in Budhiganga, Koshi Province, Nepal

- मनमोहन प्राविधिक विश्वविद्यालय
- Type: Technical province public university
- Established: 2019 (7 years ago)
- Chancellor: Chief Minister
- Vice-Chancellor: Dr. Subash Shree Pokhrel
- Location: Budhiganga -4, Koshi, Nepal; 26°33′21″N 87°17′40″E
- Campus: 33.35 acres (13.50 ha)
- Website: www.mtu.edu.np

Manmohan Technical University (MTU; Nepali: मनमोहन प्राविधिक विश्वविद्यालय)is the first technical University of Koshi Province. The first and current Vice Chancellor is Dr. Subash Shree Pokhrel.

== History ==
Manmohan Technical University is the first technical university in Nepal, founded by Government of Koshi Province. Manmohan Memorial Polytechnic with well facilitated labs, workshops, classrooms and all infrastructure was overtaken by government and transformed into a Technical University. Different from other universities in Nepal, it focuses on producing technical manpower in the field of Engineering, Pharmacy, Agriculture, Forestry, Nursing etc. from zeroth level to the highest level. Under the Koshi Province government, the Board of Governors will manage the university. This university aims to open and run constituent colleges throughout the Koshi Province of Nepal.

== Location ==
This university is situated in Budhiganga Rural Municipality of Morang district in Koshi Province of Nepal.

== Central Schools/Faculties ==
- School of Applied Science, Technology and Law
- School of Engineering
- School of Medicine and Allied Health Science

== Programs offered ==
Program	Seats
Bachelor in Civil Engineering	48
Bachelor in Electrical and Electronics Engineering	24
Bachelor of Pharmacy	20
Bachelor of Business Administration, Bachelor of Laws	40
Bachelor in Electrical Engineering	24
Master of Laws (Criminal Law)	30
Master of Hospital and Healthcare Management	30
Master of Science in Power System Engineering	15

== See also ==
- List of universities in Nepal
