= Purwanchal Campus =

Constituent campus of Tribhuvan University

Purbanchal Campus
- पूर्वाञ्चल क्याम्पस
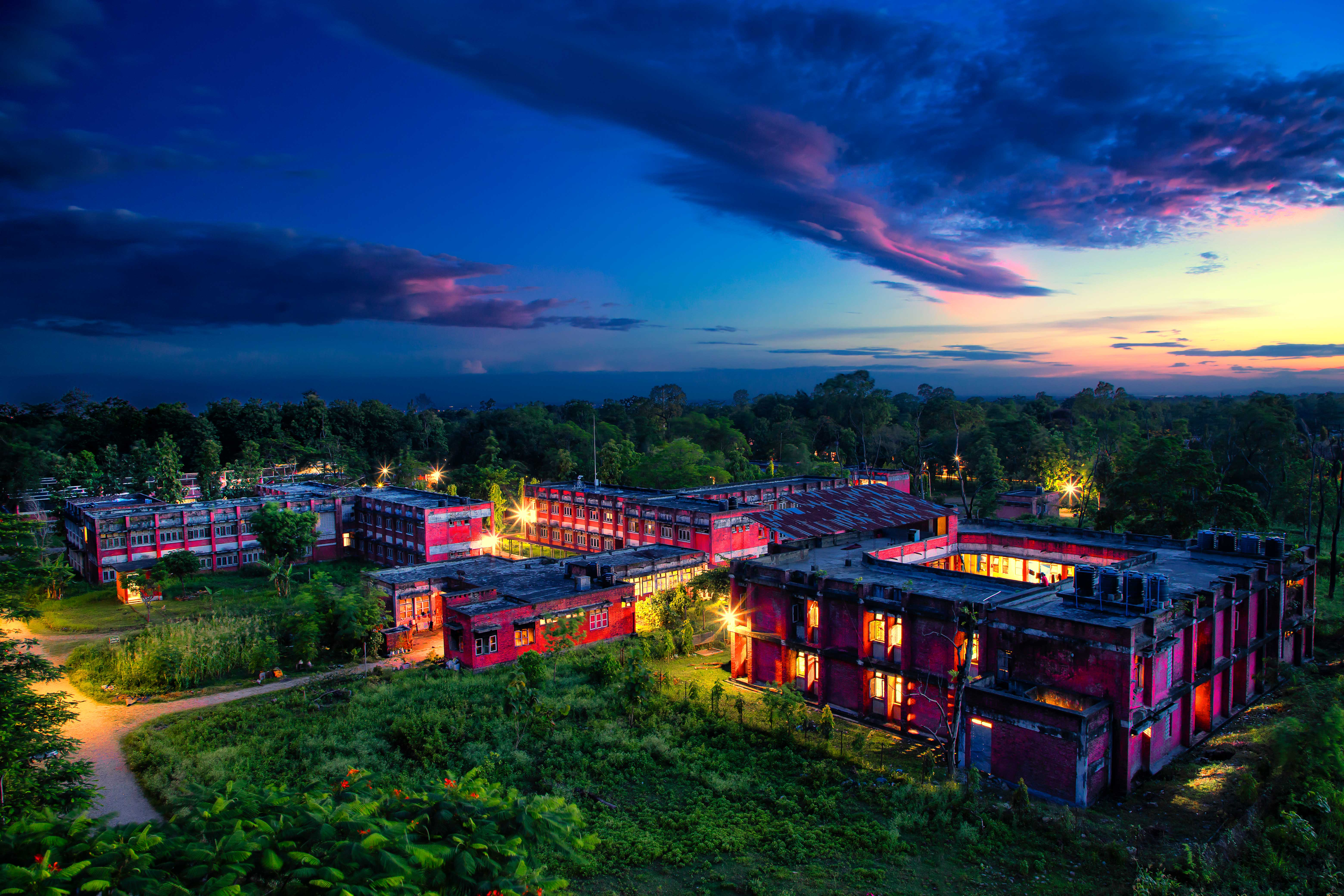
- Purwanchal Campus
- Former names: Eastern Regional Campus
- Type: Public Coeducational
- Established: 1976 A.D.
- Parent institution: Institute of Engineering
- Affiliations: Tribhuvan University
- Campus Chief: Kajiram Karki
- Students: 1800+
- Location: Tinkune, Dharan, Koshi, Nepal
- Campus: 55.7 acres (22.5 ha)
- Language: Nepali and English
- Colors
- Website: www.ioepc.edu.np

Purwanchal Campus (Nepali: पूर्वाञ्चल क्याम्पस) previously known as Eastern Regional Campus (ERC) is one of the five constituent engineering campuses under Institute of Engineering of Tribhuvan University. Purwanchal Campus is the only constituent campus of IOE, which offers agriculture engineering in context of Nepal and only campus under TU to have this program at bachelor level and master level.

Located in Dharan, a major city of Koshi Province the campus was established in 1976 A.D. to develop middle level manpower in the field in different fields engineering which upgraded its programs to bachelor and master level along the course of time.

== Course offered ==
=== Bachelor programs ===
Programs	Intake		
Programs	Regular	Full-fee	Total
Civil Engineering (BCE)	36	108	144
Computer Engineering (BCT)	24	72	96
Mechanical Engineering (BME)	24	72	96
Electrical Engineering (BEL)	12	36	48
Electronics, Communication & Information Engineering (BEI)	12	36	48
Agricultural Engineering (BAG)	12	36	48
Bachelor of Architecture (BAR)	12	36	48
Total	132	396	528

=== Masters level ===
- Masters in Land and Water engineering
- Master in Sanitation engineering
- Masters in Information System Engineering

== Student Life ==
Purwanchal Campus offers a vibrant array of student activities throughout the year, ranging from technical workshops to cultural events. Among these, CS50xNepal was a notable addition, marking its first-ever occurrence in Nepal. This program provided students with a unique opportunity to engage with a globally recognized computer science curriculum, further enriching the campus's diverse extracurricular landscape. Students participated in various activities, including hands-on projects, hackathons, and the LibreOffice 24.2 Release Party, which connected them with the broader open-source community in Nepal.

== See also ==
- Institute of Engineering
- Pulchowk Campus
- Thapathali Campus
- Pashchimanchal Campus
- Chitwan Engineering College
