= Bhola Thapa =

Nepali educator, researcher, and author

- भोला थापा
- Born: 7 July 1967 (age 59)
- Education: BITS Pilani
- Known for: Former Vice Chancellor of Kathmandu University
- Notable work: Kathmandu University
- Term: 2021-2025
- Predecessor: Ram Kantha Makaju Shrestha
- Children: 2

Prof. Dr. Bhola Thapa (born July 7, 1967) is a Nepali educationist, researcher, author. He is the vice-chancellor of Tribhuvan University since July 2026, and was the former vice chancellor of Kathmandu University. He is also a professor in the department of mechanical engineering at Kathmandu University.

== Early life and education ==
Thapa initially received his School Leaving Certificate from HMG board from Laboratory High School, Kirtipur, Kathmandu in 1983. He then got his Proficiency Certificate Level (Science) from Amrit Science Campus, Lainchaur, Kathmandu in 1986 under Tribhuvan University. Thapa completed his Bachelor of Engineering in Mechanical Engineering from Punjab Engineering College and got his degree from Panjab University, Chandigarh, India in 1991. Thapa completed his Master of Engineering in Mechanical Engineering in 1999 from Birla Institute of Technology and Science, Pilani, Rajasthan, India. Thapa then worked from April 2001 – September 2004 to receive his PhD in thesis title Sand Erosion in Hydraulic Machinery from Institute of Energy and Process Engineering, Norwegian University of Science and Technology (NTNU), Trondheim, Norway.

== Career ==
Thapa started his career in Kathmandu University as a lecturer in the department of mechanical engineering in 1994. He became an assistant professor in 2000, associate professor in 2005 and has been professor since 2008. Thapa worked as the in-charge of department of mechanical engineering for a decade in his two terms from 2000 to 2005 and 2005 to 2010. Thapa worked as the head of the department of mechanical engineering at Kathmandu University from April 2005. Thapa also worked as associate dean of the school of engineering from May 2005. Then he worked as officiating dean of the school of engineering from July 2005 to 2007. He then worked as head of the department of computer science and engineering from August 2006. Thapa then worked as the acting dean of the school of engineering from March 2007 to 2008. He then served as the dean of the school of engineering from 2008 to April 2016. Thapa then served as the registrar of Kathmandu University from 15 June 2013 to 23 August 2018 (one complete term and next partial). In his term as the registrar of Kathmandu University, he also worked as the acting vice chancellor from 16 December 2017 to 20 January 2018. From January 20, 2021, to January 17, 2025, Thapa worked as the vice chancellor of Kathmandu University.

== Books published ==
Engineer of Engineering Education is the English translated version of इन्जिनियरिङ शिक्षाका इन्जिनियर, both having been written by Thapa. The book features the role of Norwegian Inge Johansen in the initiation and development of engineering education at Kathmandu University.

== See also ==
- Suresh Raj Sharma
- Kathmandu University
