= Pulchowk Campus =

Campus of Tribhuvan University in Nepal

Pulchowk Campus Institute of Engineering
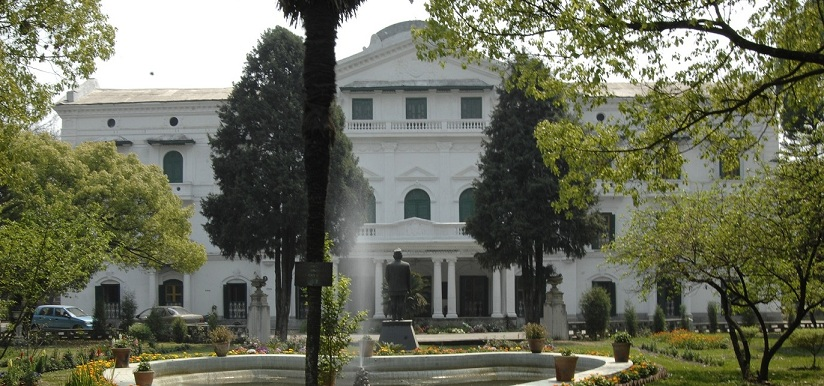
- Established: 1972; 54 years ago
- Parent institution: Tribhuvan University
- Accreditation: University Grants Commission (UGC), Nepal
- Affiliations: Institute of Engineering, Tribhuvan University
- Campus chief: Sanjaya Uprety
- Academic staff: 269
- Administrative staff: 214
- Students: 3,500+
- Location: Pulchowk, Lalitpur, Bagmati, 44600, Nepal, Lalitpur, Bagmati Province, Nepal; 27.682933°N 85.317758°E
- Campus: 60 acres; Urban
- Website: puc.tu.edu.np

Pulchowk Campus (Nepali: पुल्चोक क्याम्पस) is one of the five constituent campuses under Institute of Engineering of Tribhuvan University. Situated at Pulchowk of Lalitpur metropolitan city, Pulchowk Campus is the central campus of Institute of Engineering. Established in 1972, the campus is second oldest engineering institution of Nepal after Thapathali Campus. The campus offers bachelor degree, master degree and doctoral degree programs in various disciplines.

Students who have passed an entrance exam conducted by IOE are allowed to apply for admission. About 8000-10000 students give the entrance exam all over Nepal. It is one of the toughest entrance exam of Nepal. Students are admitted by priority selection according to their score in IOE entrance exam. The campus has 624 seats at Bachelor level and 480 seats at Masters level.

== History ==
Pulchowk Campus traces its roots back to 1931 when it began as a technical school in Basantapur, Kathmandu, initially focusing on textile worker training. By 1943, it introduced a three-year civil engineering sub-overseer program. The campus underwent shifts in location, eventually settling in Jawalakhel, Lalitpur in 1955.

In 1966, it was renamed the Nepal Engineering Institute, relocating again to Ananda Niketan in Pulchowk, where it extended the overseer program to three years. The institute's evolution continued with the addition of an electrical program in 1971, which later reverted to a two-year duration in 1976.

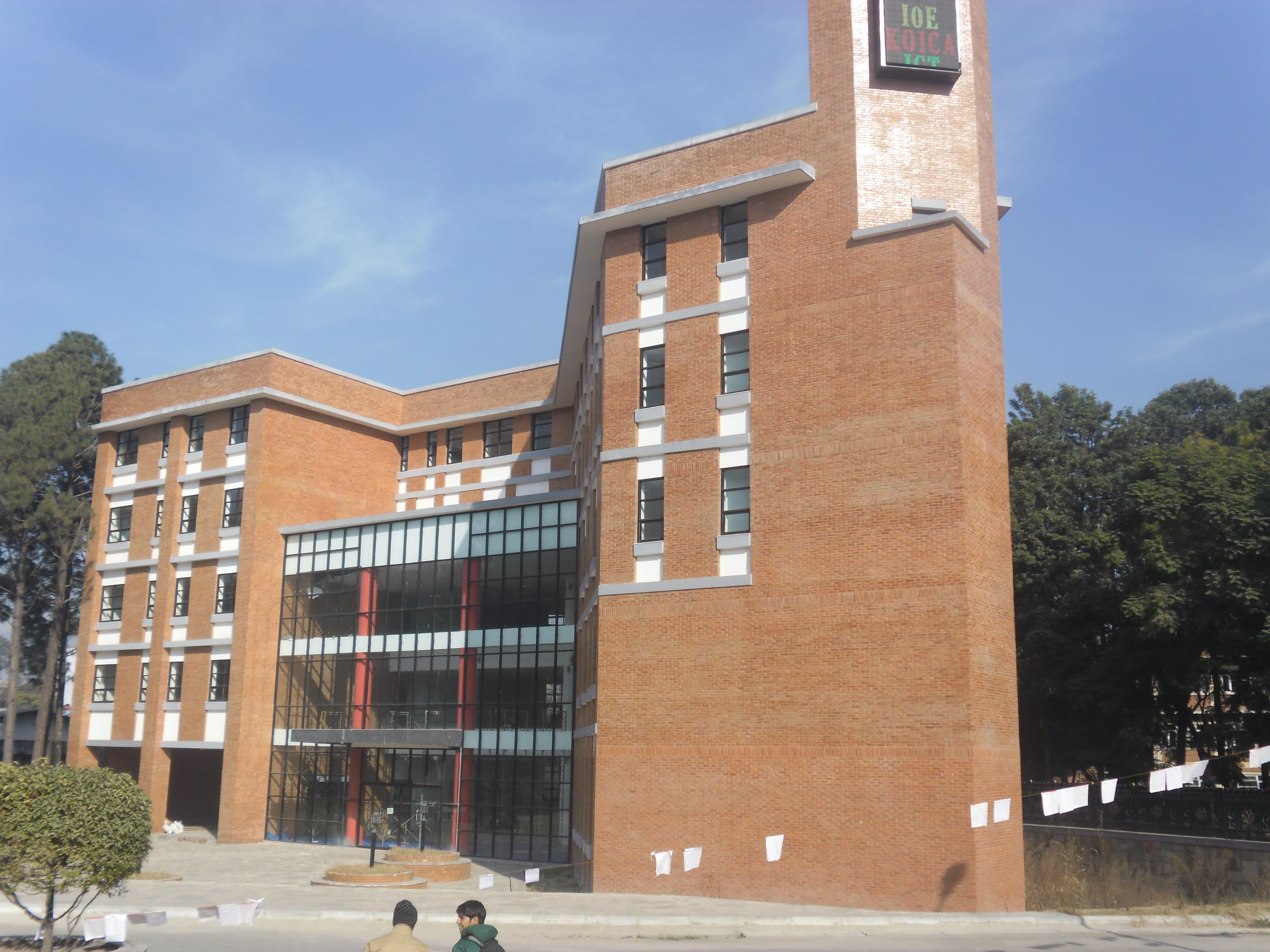
Pulchowk Campus ICTC Building

With educational reforms in 1972, the Institute of Engineering was formed under Tribhuvan University, integrating with the engineering institute in Thapathali. Since then, Pulchowk Campus has been offering programs including certificates, bachelor’s, master’s, and Ph.D. degrees across engineering disciplines like Architecture, Electronics, Mechanical, Aerospace and more.

The campus runs programs in Urban Planning, Environmental Engineering, Renewable Energy, and others.

== Courses offered ==
=== Bachelor programs ===
Programs	Intake		
Programs	Regular	Full-fee	Total
Civil Engineering (BCE)	108	84	192
Computer Engineering (BCT)	36	60	96
Mechanical Engineering (BME)	24	24	48
Electrical Engineering (BEL)	24	24	48
Electronics, Communication & Information Engineering (BEI)	24	24	48
Aerospace Engineering (BAS)	12	36	48
Chemical Engineering (BCH)	12	36	48
Bachelor of Architecture (BAR)	24	24	48
Total	264	312	576

==== Masters programs ====
Programs	Department	Intake				
Programs	Department	Regular	IOE Reserved	Full fee	Sponsored	Total
Information and Communication Engineering	Electronics and Computer engineering	5	1	6	8	20
Computer System and Knowledge Engineering	Electronics and Computer engineering	5	1	6	8	20
Computer Engineering (Specialization in Data Science and Analytics)	Electronics and Computer engineering	5	1	6	8	20
Power System Engineering	Electrical engineering	5	1	6	8	20
Power Electronics and Drives Engineering	Electrical engineering	5	1	6	8	20
Structural Engineering	Civil engineering	5	1	6	8	20
Water Resources Engineering	Civil engineering	5	1	6	8	20
Environmental Engineering	Civil engineering	5	1	6	8	20
Geotechnical Engineering	Civil engineering	5	1	6	8	20
Transportation Engineering	Civil engineering	5	1	6	8	20
Disaster Risk Management	Civil engineering	5	1	6	8	20
Construction Management	Civil engineering	5	1	6	8	20
Hydropower Engineering	Civil engineering	5	1	6	8	20
Renewable Energy Engineering	Mechanical engineering	5	1	6	8	20
Technology and Innovation Management	Mechanical engineering	5	1	6	8	20
Energy Systems Planning and Management	Mechanical engineering	5	1	6	8	20
Mechanical Systems Design and Engineering	Mechanical engineering	5	1	6	8	20
Material Science and Engineering	Applied Science	5	1	6	8	20
Climate Change and Development	Applied Science	5	1	6	8	20
Applied Mathematics	Applied Science	5	1	6	8	20
Urban Planning	Architecture	5	1	6	8	20
Energy for Sustainable Social Development	Architecture	5	1	6	8	20
Energy Efficient Buildings	Architecture	5	1	6	8	20
Architecture	Architecture	5	1	6	8	20
Total		120	24	144	192	480

== Notable alumni ==
Notable alumni of the campus include:

- Kul Man Ghising, former managing director of NEA, President of Ujyalo Nepal Party
- Shrinkhala Khatiwada, Architect, model, Miss Nepal World 2018
- Sabita Maharjan, computer scientist, professor at the University of Oslo
- CK Raut, President of Janamat Party
- Arvind Sah, Co-founder of Khalti, MP for Bara-3
- Sagar Dhakal, MP for Gulmi-1

== See also ==
- Institute of Engineering
- Thapathali Campus
- Pashchimanchal Campus
- Purwanchal Campus
- Chitwan Engineering College
