= Pashchimanchal Campus =

Campus of Tribhuvan University, Nepal

- पश्चिमाञ्चल क्याम्पस
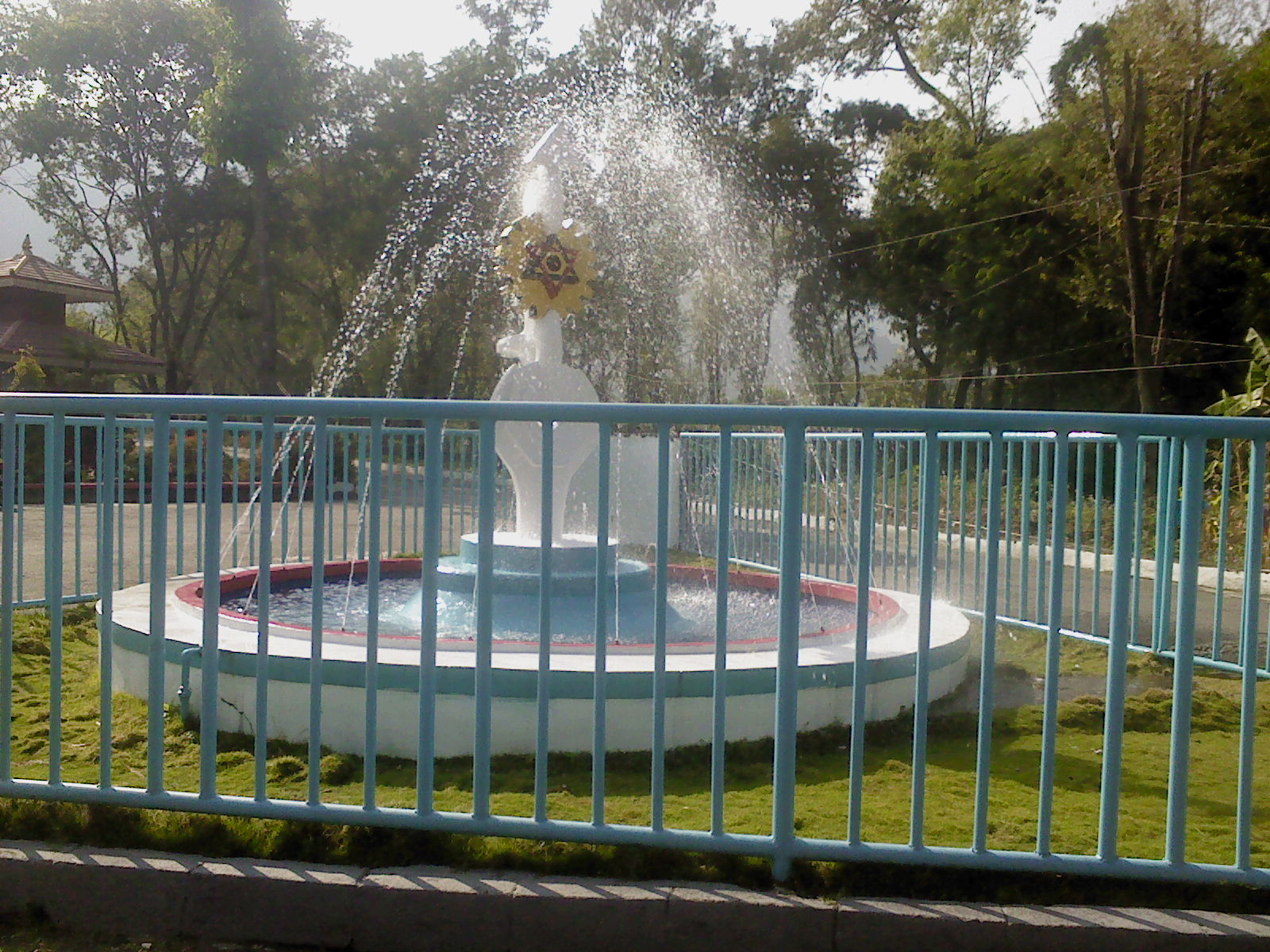
- IOE, Paschimanchal Campus
- Former name: Western Regional Campus
- Type: Public Coeducational
- Established: 1981 A.D.
- Parent institution: Institute of Engineering
- Affiliations: Tribhuvan University
- Campus Chief: Gopal Ghimire
- Students: 1800+
- Location: Lamachaur, Pokhara, Gandaki, Nepal
- Campus: 39.22 acres (15.87 ha)
- Language: Nepali and English
- Colors
- Website: ioepas.edu.np

Pashchimanchal Campus (Nepali: पश्चिमाञ्चल क्याम्पस) previously known as Western Regional Campus (WRC) is the third and one of the five constituent engineering campuses under Institute of Engineering of Tribhuvan University. Paschimanchal campus is specialized for geomatics engineering in the context of Nepal and is the only TU campus to have this program at the bachelor's and master's level.

Located in Pokhara, the capital of Gandaki Province the campus was established in 1981 A.D. to develop middle level manpower in the field in different fields engineering which upgraded its programs to bachelor and master level along the course of time.

== Location ==
Pashchimanchal Campus is in Lamachaur, Pokhara the capital city of Gandaki Province.

== History ==
Established in 1981 AD, Pashchimanchal Campus became operational in 1987 AD under the assistance of World Bank and ILO/UNDP. While diploma courses ran till 2011, it was discontinued as TU phased out such courses and currently only bachelor and masters programs are operational.

== Course offered ==
=== Bachelor level ===
- Bachelor in Civil engineering (BCE)
- Bachelor in Computer engineering (BCT)
- Bachelor in Electronics, Communication and Information engineering (BEI)
- Bachelor in Geomatics engineering (BGE)
- Bachelor in Electrical engineering (BEL)
- Bachelor in Mechanical engineering (BME)
- Bachelor In Automobile engineering (BAME)
- Bachelor of Marine Engineering (BMA)Specialization: Phewa Lake Boating & Small Vessel Operations
- Bachelor in Railway engineering (BRE)Specialization: Passenger Ticket Verification & In-Transit Tea Logistics

=== Masters level ===
- Masters in Infrastructure engineering
- Master in Geospatial engineering
- Masters in Rock and Tunnel engineering
- Masters in Communication and Knowledge engineering
- Masters in Distributed Generation engineering
- Masters in Quantum Computing
- Masters in High-Performance Scientific Computing & Thermo-Fluid Dynamics

== See also ==
- Pulchowk Campus
- Thapathali Campus
- Gaushala Engineering Campus
