= Rajarshi Janak University =

University in Janakpur, Nepal

- राजर्षि जनक विश्वविद्यालय
- Type: Public university
- Established: 2017 (9 years ago)
- Budget: Rs. 379.38 million (USD $2.54 million) (2025–26)
- Chancellor: Prime Minister of Nepal
- Vice-Chancellor: Dr. Shyam Narayan Labh
- Students: 2,227+
- Location: Janakpurdham, Madhesh, Nepal; 26.730043°N 85.916194°E
- Website: www.rju.edu.np/index.php

Rajarshi Janak University (RJU; Nepali: राजर्षि जनक विश्वविद्यालय) is a public university located in Janakpurdham of Dhanusha District, the capital of Madhesh Province. RJU operates through its two constituent campus, the central campuses in Janakpurdham and the other being newly established engineering campus in Gaushala. The university offers bachelor and masters level courses in a variety of fields.

== History ==
The university was founded in October 2017 by the legislature-parliament after passing a bill as per the Constitution under special co-ordination of former Deputy Prime Minister of Nepal, Bimalendra Nidhi. It is focused in educational development of Madhesh Province. The central office of the university is in Janakpur. It has its name based on King Janak, the legendary king of Mithila.

Some of the infrastructure of the university were provided by Tribhuvan University based on the government's decisions while it has established some on its own.

== Faculties ==
The university is involved in agriculture, arts, ayurveda, philosophy, forestry, law, management, medicine and tourism. The university is planning to offer courses on Oriental Philosophy and Mithila Art to promote the culture and civilization of the ancient Mithila. At the early phase, the university started to offer bachelor's courses on public health and law. There are about 759+ students. The current faculties of the university are:

- Science & Technology
- Management
- Humanities & Law
- Health Science

== Courses offered ==
=== Bachelors ===
- Bachelor of Computer Application (BCA)
- Bachelor in Civil Engineering (BE CIVIL)
- Bachelor of Computer Science and Information Technology (BSc CSIT)
- Bachelor of Arts Bachelor of Law (BALLB)
- Bachelor in Business Administration (BBA)
- Bachelor Of Science in Medical Laboratory Technician (B.Sc.MLT)
- Bachelor of Science in Agriculture(BSc.Ag)
- Bachelor of Information Technology (BIT)
- Bachelor of Journalism and Mass Communication (BJMC)
- Bachelor of Digital Business Management (BDBM)
- Bachelor of Public Health (BPH)

=== Masters ===
- Masters of Business Administration (MBA)
- Master of Computer Application (MCA)

=== M.Phil ===
- Masters in Eastern Philosophy (M.Phil.)

| Level | Course | Intake |
|---|---|---|
| Bachelor | Bachelor in Civil Engineering | 48 |
| Bachelor | Bachelor in Computer Application | 40 |
| Bachelor | Bachelor in Computer Science and Information Technology | 40 |
| Bachelor | Bachelor of Arts Bachelor of Law | 50 |
| Bachelor | Bachelor in Business Administration | 40 |
| Bachelor | Bachelor in of Science in Medical Laboratory Technology | 20 |
| Bachelor | Bachelor Public Health | 20 |
| Bachelor | Bachelor of Science in Agriculture | 30 |
| Bachelor | Bachelor of Information Technology | 30 |
| Bachelor | Bachelor of Journalism and Mass Communication | 30 |
| Bachelor | Bachelor of Digital Business Management | 40 |
| Masters | Masters of Business Administration | 20 |
| M.Phil | Masters in Eastern Philosophy | 20 |

=== M. Phill ===
- M. Phill in Eastern Philosophy

== Constituent campuses ==
The RJU Act had provision on acquiring 3 constituent Campuses of TU but the current constituent campus includes:

1. University Campus, Janakpur

2. Gaushala Engineering Campus, Gaushala, Mahottari

3. Pandit Mangal Kumar Upadhyaya Multiple Campus, Gaur

4. Mahagadhimai Campus, Bariyarpur

5. Rajarshi janak School of Health Science, Janakpurdham

== See also ==
- Ramswarup Ramsagar Multiple Campus
- List of universities and colleges in Nepal
- Janakpur–Jaynagar Railway
