= Purbanchal University =

Public university in Sundarharaicha, Morang, Nepal

- पूर्वाञ्चल विश्वविद्यालय
- Type: Public university
- Established: 1995 (31 years ago)
- Budget: Rs. 1.70 billion (USD $11 million) (2025–26)
- Chancellor: Prime Minister of Nepal
- Vice-Chancellor: Dr. Sujan Babu Marahatta
- Academic staff: 396 (~100 teaching staff 296 administrative and support personnel)
- Students: 26,128
- Location: Sundar Haraicha, Koshi, Nepal; 26.68°N 87.35°E
- Campus: 1,346 acres (545 ha); Midsize city
- Website: purbanchaluniversity.edu.np puexam.edu.np

Purbanchal University (PU; Nepali: पूर्वाञ्चल विश्वविद्यालय)is a public university located in Koshi Province, Nepal. It was established in 1995 as the second university in Nepal after the restoration of multi-party democracy by the Government of Nepal. With more than 26,128 students, Purbanchal University stands as the third largest university in Nepal.

Purbanchal University conducts its academic programs in 74 subjects through its five constituent campuses and 123 affiliated colleges. The university's main campus in Biratnagar covers 545 hectares.

== History ==
Purbanchal University was established in 1995 AD by the then prime minister Girija Prasad Koirala after the restoration of multi-party democracy to develop Eastern Development region as educational hub focusing the region.

== Mission ==
At present, the university has broadly identified Business Administration, Industry-Technology, Agriculture-Forestry, Environment Rural-Cultural Subsistence and Sustainable Development as specific areas of "Academic Excellence".

== Constituent campuses ==
=== Purbanchal University School of Management (PUSOM) ===
School of Management is the First Constituent College of Purbanchal University. It introduced the first Bachelor of Business Administration (BBA) program in Nepal. It is located in Tinpaini, Biratnagar.

The School offers courses of BBA, BHM, MBA. It also offers course of M Phill and PHd under its premises.

=== Purbanchal University School of Engineering (PUSOE) ===
Purbanchal University School of Engineering (PUSET), formerly known as Science and Technology Campus was established in 2056 BS in Biratnagar. It was established as a constituent campus of Purbanchal University and is the only one of its kind in the Eastern Region, with information technology based curriculum for undergraduate and graduate students. It runs bachelor and masters course in various disciplines of engineering.

=== Purbanchal University College of Environment and Forestry (PUCEF) ===
Purbanchal University College of Environment and Forestry is one of the schools under Purbanchal University established in 2074 BS. It is located in Gothgaun, Morang. It is currently running bachelor level course in forestry.

=== Purbanchal University School of Health Science (PUSHS) ===
Purbanchal University School of Health Science is a constituent college of Purbanchal University located in Gothgaun, Morang. It offers bachelor and masters level courses in Nursing, Pharmacy, Lab Technology and Public Health as well as MBBS program.

=== Purbanchal University School of Medicine (PUSM) ===
Purbanchal University School of Medicine is the youngest constituent college located at Gothgaun, Morang. It offers MBBS course in partnership with Koshi Hospital, Biratnagar. It plans to introduce BDS, post-graduate medical courses and superspeciality courses in future.

=== Purbanchal University School of Science and Technology (PUSAT) ===
Purbanchal University School of Science and Technology is also a constituent campus of Purbanchal University. Located in Kanyamarg, Biratnagar. It offers Bachelor courses in Computer Application, Information Technology and B.Tech. in Artificial Intelligence. In addition Masters of Computer Application and Master of Information Technology is also run under PUSAT.

=== GP Koirala College of Agriculture and Research Center ===
GP Koirala College of Agriculture and research center is one of the constituent campus of Purbanchal University conducting BSc Ag and Bachelor in Agriculture Engineering courses producing and developing manpower in sector of Agriculture and Animal Science.

=== Janata Adarsha Multiple Campus ===
Janata Adarsha Multiple Campus is also one of the constituent campuses offering courses of Bachelor in Social Work (BSW), Bachelor of Education (B.Ed.). It also offers course of MSc in Population and Rural Development and Masters in Education. It conducts various non technical courses.

== Faculties ==
There are seven different faculties under Purbanchal University for providing education in different streams.

- Faculty of Arts
- Faculty of Management
- Faculty of Science and Technology
- Faculty of Education
- Faculty of Law
- Faculty of Medical & Allied Science
- Faculty of Engineering (PUFOE)

== See also ==
- College of Information Technology and Engineering
- Himalayan College of Geomatic Engineering and Land Management
