= Tribhuvan University =

Public university in Kirtipur, Kathmandu, Nepal

- त्रिभुवन विश्वविद्यालय
- Type: Public university
- Established: June 25, 1959 (67 years ago)
- Budget: NPR 30.871 billion (2026–27)
- Chancellor: Prime Minister of Nepal
- Vice-Chancellor: Bhola Thapa
- Academic staff: 8,122 (2023–24)
- Students: 561,170 (2024–25)
- Location: Kirtipur, Bagmati, Nepal; 27.68184°N 85.28646°E
- Website: tu.edu.np

Tribhuvan University (TU; Nepali: त्रिभुवन विश्वविद्यालय) is a public university located in Kirtipur, Kathmandu, Nepal. Established in 1959, it is the oldest and largest university in Nepal, with 561,170 students enrolled across its constituent campuses and affiliated colleges in the 2024–2025 fiscal year. Additionally, the institution has 5 Institutes, 4 Faculties, 40 Central Departments. 64 constituent campuses 1,053 affiliated colleges and 4 Research Centers across the country.

== History ==
Named after the late King Tribhuvan, Tribhuvan University was established on 25 June 1959 (11 Ashar 2016 BS). It is the oldest and largest university in Nepal. In its early years, all the postgraduate classes were held at Tripureshwor Campus, where the administrative office was also located. It was only in 1967 that the university was relocated to its main campus in Kirtipur – an ancient town about 5 km south-west of the city of Kathmandu. The university site, spread over 154.77 hectares, constitutes the Central Administrative Office and the Central Campus.

== Academics ==
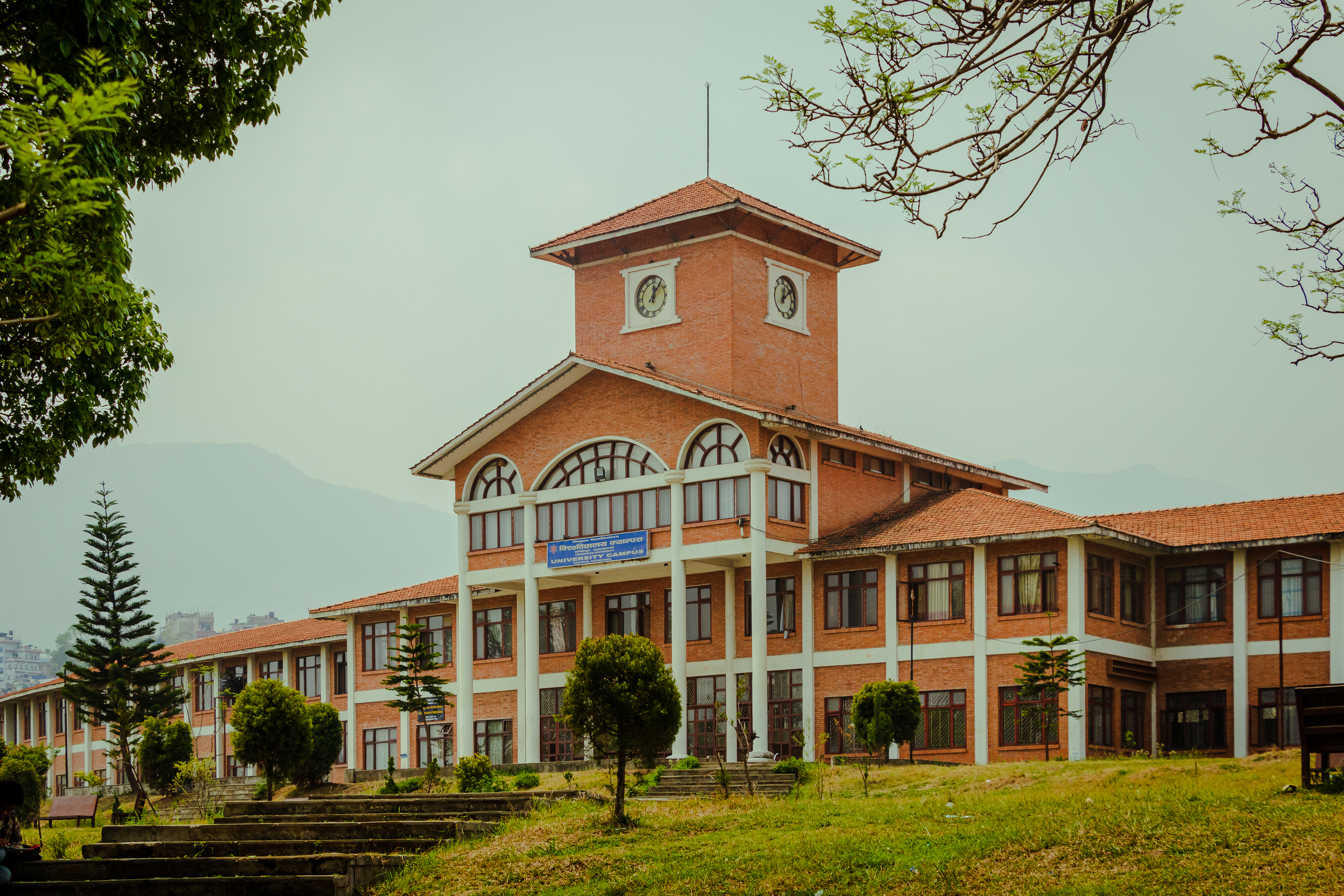
University Campus, TU

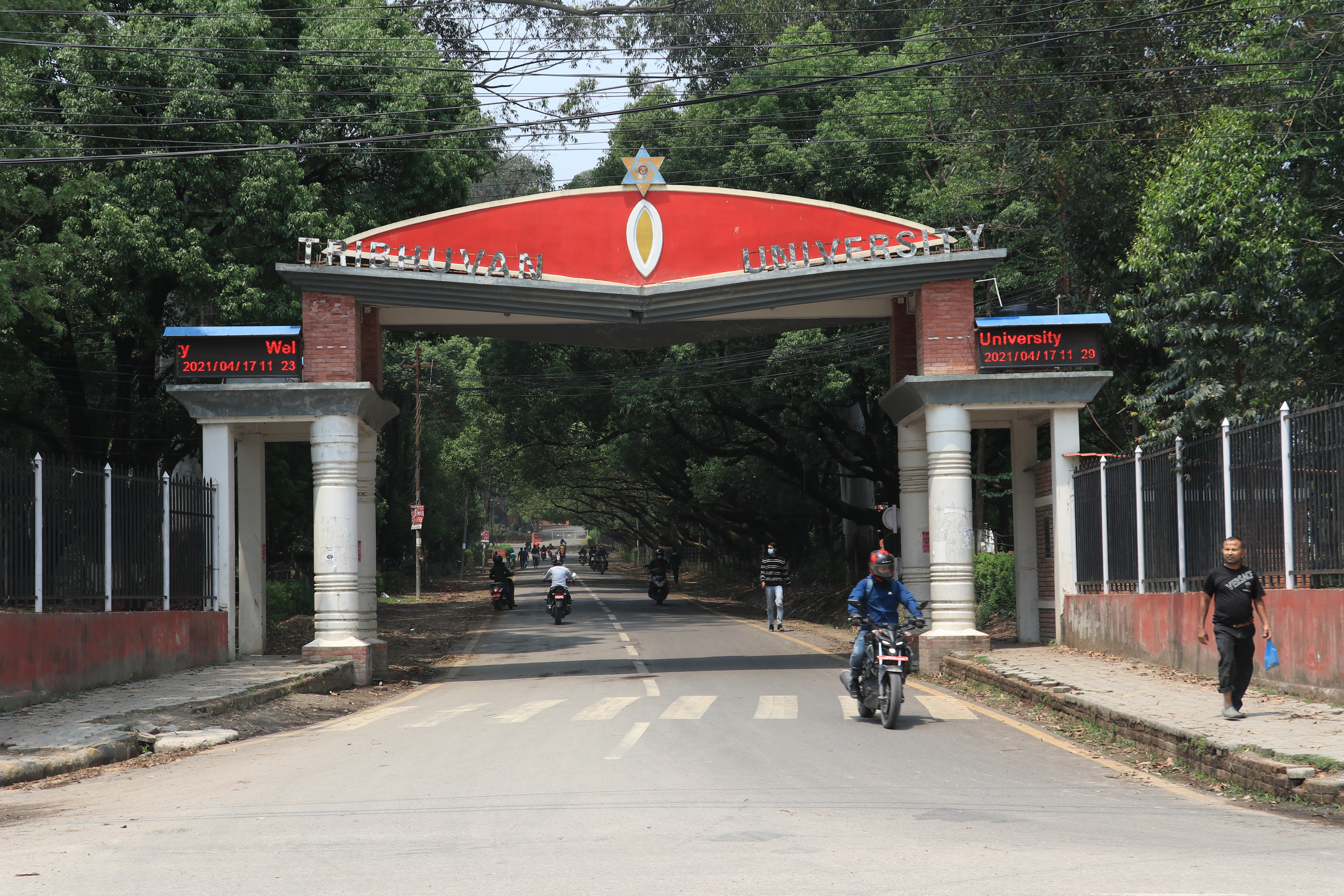
TU eastern entrance

Since its inception, the state-owned university has expanded its programmes. There are five technical institutes and four general faculties. The university offers 115 courses for the technical proficiency certificate level. TU offers 1079 courses at Bachelor's level and 1000 courses at Master's level. It offers PhD degrees in the technical institutes and faculties.

Tribhuvan University ran its programmes only through its constituent campuses before 1980. With the increasing number of students seeking higher education, it was not possible to accommodate all the students in the constituent campuses. This situation led to the establishment of colleges in the private sector because the constituent campuses alone could not meet the demand. From 1979 to 1980, TU started providing affiliation to private colleges. As of April 2016, 1,084 private and public colleges were affiliated with TU.

In the 2014–2015 academic session, 405,341 students were enrolled in TU academic programmes. Of these, 148,141 (36.55%) studied at its 60 constituent campuses, including 38 central departments, while 257,200 (63.45%) studied at 1,053 affiliated colleges.

According to the Office of the Auditor General's 63rd annual report(2026), TU recorded 561,170 students in the 2024–2025 fiscal year. The report also recorded 64 constituent campuses, 44 central departments and 1,053 affiliated colleges.

Student enrollment and educational quality

Tribhuvan University is the largest university in Nepal by student enrolment. According to the University Grants Commission (UGC), the university had 531,581 students enrolled in the 2024–25 academic year, distributed across 1,045 campuses. These included 62 constituent campuses, 547 community campuses and 436 privately affiliated campuses. The university had 7,938 teachers, with a reported student–teacher ratio of 24:1.

The university has established institutional mechanisms for quality assurance and accreditation. Its Centre for Quality Assurance and Accreditation was established in 2017 to facilitate the accreditation of constituent campuses, central departments and schools. The University Grants Commission of Nepal operates a Quality Assurance and Accreditation (QAA) system that evaluates higher education institutions on criteria including institutional capacity, academic programmes, teaching methodologies, research, student assessment and infrastructure.

The recognition of Tribhuvan University's qualifications internationally is subject to the requirements of individual countries, educational institutions and professional regulatory bodies. Credential evaluation organisations such as World Education Services assess foreign qualifications according to factors including the recognition status of the awarding institution, programme structure, admission requirements and academic level. Such evaluations do not guarantee admission to foreign universities or employment.

== Rankings ==
Tribhuvan University has been included in several international university rankings. In the 2024 edition of the Times Higher Education World University Rankings, it was placed in the 1201–1500 band globally and the 251–300 band in the Times Higher Education Asia University Rankings. Its position in the THE World University Rankings subsequently declined to the 1501+ band in the 2025 and 2026 editions.

In the 2026 edition of the Center for World University Rankings (CWUR), Tribhuvan University was ranked 1,581st globally and 610th in Asia, placing first among universities in Nepal included in the ranking.

In the 2026 QS World University Rankings by Subject, the university was placed in the 401–475 band in its listed subject ranking.

== Technical institutes ==
The university administers its science and technology programs, such as BSc, BE, MBBS, etc., through its technical institutes. There are five technical institutes at the university, each taking care of a specific domain within the field of science and technology education.

- Institute of Agriculture and Animal Science (IAAS): IAAS offers a four-year B.Sc. in Agriculture and a five-year B.V.Sc. & A.H. at the undergraduate level, alongside postgraduate and doctoral programs in agricultural and veterinary sciences. The institute operates four constituent campuses—Rampur (Chitwan), Lamjung, Paklihawa (Rupandehi), and Gauradaha (Jhapa)—while postgraduate programs, including M.Sc. and Ph.D. in Agriculture and Masters in Veterinary Sciences, are conducted from its dedicated building at TU, Kirtipur. Its flagship undergraduate offering is the B.Sc. Agriculture, which serves as the institute's core program and is delivered across its constituent and affiliated campuses nationwide.
- Institute of Engineering (IOE): IOE offers Bachelor of Engineering (BE) programs across twelve disciplines, including Civil, Electrical, Electronics, Computer, Mechanical, Automobile, Geomatics, Industrial, Agriculture, Architecture, Aerospace, and Chemical Engineering. The institute is headquartered at Pulchowk, Lalitpur, which serves as its central campus. Its largest and most historically significant program is Civil Engineering, which was the first four-year bachelor's program introduced at Pulchowk Campus in 1984 and remains the foundational engineering degree of the institute.
- Institute of Forestry (IOF): IOF provides a four-year B.Sc. Forestry, along with Master's and Ph.D. programs in forestry and natural resource management. The institute is based in Hariyokharka, Pokhara, where both the Dean's Office and the Pokhara Campus are located. The B.Sc. Forestry is its foundational undergraduate degree, originally launched as a three-year program in 1981 and expanded to a four-year curriculum in 1995. The IOF is described as Nepal's premier and only institution fully dedicated to education and training in Forestry and Natural Resource Management.
- Institute of Medicine (IOM): IOM is the largest health professional training institution within the university, offering the MBBS along with postgraduate medical, surgical, and allied health programs. Its most significant degree is the MBBS, which remains the cornerstone of its medical education and is offered at Maharajgunj Medical Campus. The Maharajgunj Medical Campus conducts approximately ninety percent of the institute's educational activities, including eleven undergraduate and thirty-six postgraduate programs.
- Institute of Science and Technology (IOST): IOST offers a diverse portfolio of programs, including Bachelor's degrees in General B.Sc., B.Sc. CSIT, B.Tech Food Technology, B.Math Sc., BIT, and BDS, as well as Master's, M.Phil., and Ph.D. programs across the basic and applied sciences. The institute is headquartered in Kirtipur, Kathmandu. Its most prominent and sought-after program is B.Sc. CSIT (Computer Science and Information Technology), a four-year, eight-semester program that is widely regarded as one of the university's most rigorous and demanding IT degrees.

== Faculties and associated Central Departments ==
There are four faculties and a total of 40 associated central departments and 4 Research centers at the university:

=== Faculty of Humanities and Social Sciences ===
- Central Department of English, Kirtipur, Kathmandu.
- Central Department of Nepali, Kirtipur, Kathmandu.
- Central Department of Hindi, Kirtipur, Kathmandu.
- Central Department of Sanskrit, Kirtipur, Kathmandu.
- Central Department of Nepal Bhasha, Patan Dhoka, Lalitpur.
- Central Department of History, Kirtipur, Kathmandu.
- Central Department of Linguistics, Kirtipur, Kathmandu.
- Central Department of Buddhist Studies, Kirtipur, Kathmandu.
- Central Department of Sociology, Kirtipur, Kathmandu.
- Central Department of Psychology, Kirtipur, Kathmandu.
- Central Department of Anthropology, Kirtipur, Kathmandu.
- Central Department of Geography, Kirtipur, Kathmandu.
- Central Department of Economics, Kirtipur, Kathmandu.
- Central Department of Social Work, Kirtipur, Kathmandu.
- Central Department of Home Science, Bagbazar, Kathmandu.
- Central Department of Fine Arts, Kirtipur, Kathmandu.
- Central Department of Political Science, Kirtipur, Kathmandu.
- Central Department of Rural Development, Kirtipur, Kathmandu.
- Central Department of Population Studies, Kirtipur, Kathmandu.
- Central Department of Journalism and Mass Communication, Exhibition Road, Kathmandu.
- Central Department of Library and Information Science, Kirtipur, Kathmandu.
- Central Department of Nepalese History, Culture and Archaeology, Kirtipur, Kathmandu.
- Central Department of International Relations and Diplomacy, Kirtipur, Kathmandu.
- Central Department of Conflict, Peace and Development Studies, Kirtipur, Kathmandu.

=== Faculty of Education ===
- Central Department of Education, Kirtipur, Kathmandu.
- Central Department of Curriculum and Evaluation, Kirtipur, Kathmandu.
- Central Department of Educational Planning and Management, Kirtipur, Kathmandu.
- Central Department of Health and Physical Education, Kirtipur, Kathmandu.
- Central Department of Mathematics Education, Kirtipur, Kathmandu.
- Central Department of Science Education, Kirtipur, Kathmandu.
- Central Department of English Education, Kirtipur, Kathmandu.
- Central Department of Nepali Education, Kirtipur, Kathmandu.
- Central Department of Geography Education, Kirtipur, Kathmandu.
- Central Department of History Education, Kirtipur, Kathmandu.
- Central Department of Economics Education, Kirtipur, Kathmandu.
- Central Department of Political Science Education, Kirtipur, Kathmandu.

=== Faculty of Management ===
- Central Department of Management, Kirtipur, Kathmandu.
- Central Department of Public Administration, Balkhu, Kathmandu.

=== Faculty of Law ===
- Central Department of Law, Exhibition Road, Kathmandu.

== Research centers ==
Tribhuvan University has the following research centers:

- Centre for Economic Development and Administration (CEDA)
- Centre for Nepal and Asian Studies (CNAS), formerly called the Institute for Nepal and Asian Studies (INAS)
- Research Center for Applied Science and Technology (RECAST)
- Research Centre for Educational Innovation and Development (CERID)

== Schools ==
- School of Mathematical Sciences
- Graduate School of Education
- School of Management
- School of Forestry

== Constituent campuses ==
Tribhuvan University has constituent campuses in all seven provinces of Nepal. Its annual publication, TU Today 2082, provides a province-wise listing of constituent campuses and their academic programmes. The University Grants Commission of Nepal also publishes campus-level information, including geographical distribution and enrolment statistics.

Campus	Municipality	District	Province
Bhojpur Multiple Campus	Bhojpur	Bhojpur	Koshi
Dhankuta Multiple Campus	Dhankuta	Dhankuta	Koshi
Mahendra Ratna Multiple Campus	Ilam	Ilam	Koshi
Mechi Multiple Campus	Bhadrapur	Jhapa	Koshi
Gauradaha Agriculture Campus	Gauradaha	Jhapa	Koshi
Degree Campus	Biratnagar	Morang	Koshi
Snatakottar Campus	Biratnagar	Morang	Koshi
Biratnagar Nursing Campus	Biratnagar	Morang	Koshi
Mahendra Morang Adarsh Multiple Campus	Biratnagar	Morang	Koshi
Central Campus of Technology (Hattisar Campus)	Dharan	Sunsari	Koshi
Mahendra Multiple Campus	Dharan	Sunsari	Koshi
Purwanchal Campus	Dharan	Sunsari	Koshi
Terhathum Multiple Campus	Aathrai	Terhathum District	Koshi
Ramswarup Ramsagar Multiple Campus	Janakpur	Dhanusha	Madhesh
Birgunj Nursing Campus	Birgunj	Parsa	Madhesh
Thakur Ram Multiple Campus	Birgunj	Parsa	Madhesh
Mahendra Bindeshwori Multiple Campus	Rajbiraj	Saptari	Madhesh
S. S. M. Y. Multiple Campus	Siraha	Siraha	Madhesh
Bhaktapur Multiple Campus	Bhaktapur	Bhaktapur	Bagmati
Sanothimi Campus	Madhyapur Thimi	Bhaktapur	Bagmati
Birendra Multiple Campus	Bharatpur	Chitwan	Bagmati
Chitwan Engineering Campus	Bharatpur	Chitwan	Bagmati
Amrit Campus	Kathmandu	Kathmandu	Bagmati
Bishwo Bhasha Campus	Kathmandu	Kathmandu	Bagmati
Lalitkala Campus	Kathmandu	Kathmandu	Bagmati
Maharajgunj Medical Campus	Kathmandu	Kathmandu	Bagmati
Maharajgunj Nursing Campus	Kathmandu	Kathmandu	Bagmati
Mahendra Ratna Campus	Kathmandu	Kathmandu	Bagmati
Nepal Commerce Campus	Kathmandu	Kathmandu	Bagmati
Nepal Law Campus	Kathmandu	Kathmandu	Bagmati
Padma Kanya Multiple Campus	Kathmandu	Kathmandu	Bagmati
Jana Prasashan Campus	Kathmandu	Kathmandu	Bagmati
Public Youth Campus	Kathmandu	Kathmandu	Bagmati
Ratna Rajya Lakshmi Campus	Kathmandu	Kathmandu	Bagmati
Saraswoti Multiple Campus	Kathmandu	Kathmandu	Bagmati
Shanker Dev Campus	Kathmandu	Kathmandu	Bagmati
Thapathali Campus	Kathmandu	Kathmandu	Bagmati
Tri-Chandra Multiple Campus	Kathmandu	Kathmandu	Bagmati
Ayurveda Campus	Kirtipur	Kathmandu	Bagmati
University Campus	Kirtipur	Kathmandu	Bagmati
Patan Multiple Campus	Lalitpur	Lalitpur	Bagmati
Pulchowk Campus	Lalitpur	Lalitpur	Bagmati
Dhawalagiri Multiple Campus	Baglung	Baglung	Gandaki
Gorkha Campus	Gorkha	Gorkha	Gandaki
Pokhara Campus (Forestry)	Pokhara	Kaski	Gandaki
Pashchimanchal Campus	Pokhara	Kaski	Gandaki
Pokhara Nursing Campus	Pokhara	Kaski	Gandaki
Prithvi Narayan Campus	Pokhara	Kaski	Gandaki
Lamjung Campus	Sundarbazar	Lamjung	Gandaki
Butwal Multiple Campus	Butwal	Rupandehi	Lumbini
Bhairahawa Multiple Campus	Siddharthanagar	Rupandehi	Lumbini
Nepalgunj Nursing Campus	Nepalgunj	Banke	Lumbini
Paklihawa Campus	Siddharthanagar	Rupandehi	Lumbini
Tribhuvan Multiple Campus	Tansen	Palpa	Lumbini
Mahendra Multiple Campus	Ghorahi	Dang	Lumbini
Mahendra Multiple Campus	Nepalgunj	Banke	Lumbini
Jumla Multiple Campus	Chandannath	Jumla	Karnali
Surkhet Multiple Campus	Birendranagar	Surkhet	Karnali
Dadeldhura Multiple Campus	Amargadhi	Dadeldhura	Sudurpashchim
Doti Multiple Campus	Dipayal Silgadhi	Doti	Sudurpashchim
Siddhanath Science Campus	Bhimdatta	Kanchanpur	Sudurpashchim
Khaptad Engineering Campus	Dhangadhi	Kailali	Sudurpashchim

== Organization ==
TU is government-financed but still an autonomous organization. The head of the government, the prime minister, is its chancellor.

- Chancellor: Prime Minister of Nepal (Balendra Shah)
- Pro-Chancellor: Minister of Education (Sasmit Pokharel)
- Vice Chancellor: Prof. (Dr.) Bhola Thapa
- Rector: Prof. (Dr.) Khadga K.C.
- Registrar: Prof. (Dr.) Kedar Rijal

== Societies ==
- Nepal Chemical Society
- Nepal Mathematical Society
- Nepal Physical Society
- Nepal Geography Student Society
- Nepal Geographical Society
- Economics Students Society, Central Department of Economics

== Facilities ==
- Natural History Museum
- Ayurveda Teaching Hospital
- Tribhuvan University Central Library
- Tribhuvan University Teaching Hospital
- B.P. Koirala Lions Centre for Ophthalmic Studies (BPKLCOS)
- Tribhuvan University Cricket Ground
- Manmohan Cardiothoracic Vascular & Transplant Center

== The free student union at Tribhuvan University ==
Tribhuvan University also has a free student union as another facility. This free student union has established the rights and interests of students who come to study at the university and to solve students' problems. The committee of the students' union has to be elected at the university. The university students who are affiliated with different political parties vote for their supporter leaders. The student union election is held every two years. Regardless of winning by embracing the idea of any party, the student union works to solve problems for all students.

== Student Life ==
=== Student Organizations ===
==== CSIT Association of Butwal Multiple Campus ====
The CSIT (Computer Science and Information Technology) Association at Butwal Multiple Campus represents students pursuing computer science and information technology programs at the campus. Located in Butwal, the capital of Lumbini Province, the association functions as a departmental student organization dedicated to advancing academic and professional development opportunities for CSIT students.

The association's primary objectives include advocating for the academic interests and rights of computer science students, organizing seminars and workshops to facilitate professional development, fostering collaboration between students and industry professionals, and addressing departmental challenges that affect student learning experiences. The association operates through an elected committee system, with leadership positions determined through student voting. Leadership elections are conducted periodically to ensure responsive representation of student interests.

===== Activities and Events =====
The CSIT Association of Butwal Multiple Campus organizes various academic and professional development initiatives. Notable events and programs include:

- BMC Innovatex - An annual innovation and entrepreneurship hackathon that brings together students, professionals, and entrepreneurs to showcase technology projects, startups, and innovative solutions in information technology.
- Tech Month - A month-long series of technical seminars, workshops, and competitions focused on contemporary issues in computer science and information technology, conducted annually to develop technical skills and knowledge among students.

These initiatives provide platforms for students to gain practical experience, network with industry professionals, and contribute to technological advancement within Lumbini Province.

Beyond campus-specific initiatives, the association actively contributes to development efforts across Lumbini Province, extending its engagement beyond academic activities to support broader educational and community development goals in the region. The organization maintains a commitment to serving all CSIT students impartially, irrespective of any political ideologies or factional affiliations of individual members or elected representatives.

===== Online Presence =====
The CSIT Association maintains an official web presence to facilitate communication and information dissemination regarding its activities and events. Students and stakeholders can access information about the association's initiatives through its official online platforms and dedicated event websites.

== Notable alumni ==
- Pushpa Kamal Dahal, prime minister of Nepal
- Sushila Karki, interim prime minister of Nepal
- Bimalendra Nidhi, deputy prime minister of Nepal
- Arjun Narasingha KC, 5-time former minister and Nepali Congress party leader completed his master's degree in political science at TU
- Gagan Thapa, former health minister and popular youth leader who studied sociology at TU
- Sushma Shakya, award-winning visual artist
- Sharada Sharma, writer
- Udayraj Khanal, physicist
- Binil Aryal, physicist
- Bodh Narayan Shrestha, MP from RSP
- Bharat Prasad Parajuli, MP from RSP
- Ananda Bahadur Chand, MP from RSP
- Komal Gyawali, MP from RSP
- Jagat Prasad Joshi, MP from RSP
- Asha Jha, MP from RSP
- Rabindra Patel, MP from RSP
- Sushil Kumar Kanu, MP from RSP
- Prakash Chandra Pariyar, MP from RSP
- Ramesh Prasai, MP from RSP
- Udit Narayan, playback singer
- Yuba Raj Khatiwada, economist and former governor of Nepal Rastra Bank
- Malvika Subba, Nepalese TV personality
- Niranjan Parajuli, Nepali chemist
- Madhav Kumar Nepal, former prime minister of Nepal
- Suman Pokhrel, Nepali poet and lyricist
- Abhi Subedi, Nepali poet and playwright
- Radha Paudel, Nepalese nurse, activist and writer
- Gyanendra Shah, former King of Nepal
- Shriya Shah-Klorfine, Nepalese-Canadian who died on Mount Everest
- Bidya Devi Bhandari, former president of Nepal
- Ek Nath Dhakal, Nepalese politician
- Krishna Bahadur Mahara, former speaker of the House of Representatives of Nepal
- Shankar Pokharel, 1st Chief Minister of Lumbini Province
- Sunil Kumar Yadav, Nepalese politician
- Ram Sharan Mahat, former Minister of Foreign Affairs of Nepal
- Khil Raj Regmi, former Chief Justice and (acting) prime minister of Nepal
- Arjun Karki, diplomat
- Gyan Chandra Acharya, diplomat
- Agni Prasad Sapkota, former speaker of the Parliament of Nepal
- Sarita Lamichhane, Nepalese actress
- Purna Chandra Thapa, former Chief of Army Staff of the Nepal Army
- Prabhu Ram Sharma, former Chief of Army Staff of the Nepal Army
- Rookmangud Katawal, former Chief of Army Staff of the Nepal Army
- Dharmapaal Barsingh Thapa, former Chief of Army Staff of the Nepal Army
- Bipin Karki, Nepalese film actor
- Queen Aishwarya of Nepal, Queen of Nepal
- Prince Dhirendra of Nepal, member of the Shah dynasty
- Keki Adhikari, Nepalese film actress
- Jeevan Ram Shrestha, former Minister of Culture, Tourism and Civil Aviation of Nepal
- Geeta Tripathee, Nepali poet and lyricist
- Devyani Rana, member of the Rana dynasty
- Krishna Hari Pushkar, former secretary of the Government of Nepal

== See also ==
- List of universities in Nepal
- List of largest universities and university networks by enrollment
